= Federal Ministry of Finance (Germany) =

Federal ministry of the Federal Republic of Germany

- Bundesministerium der Finanzen

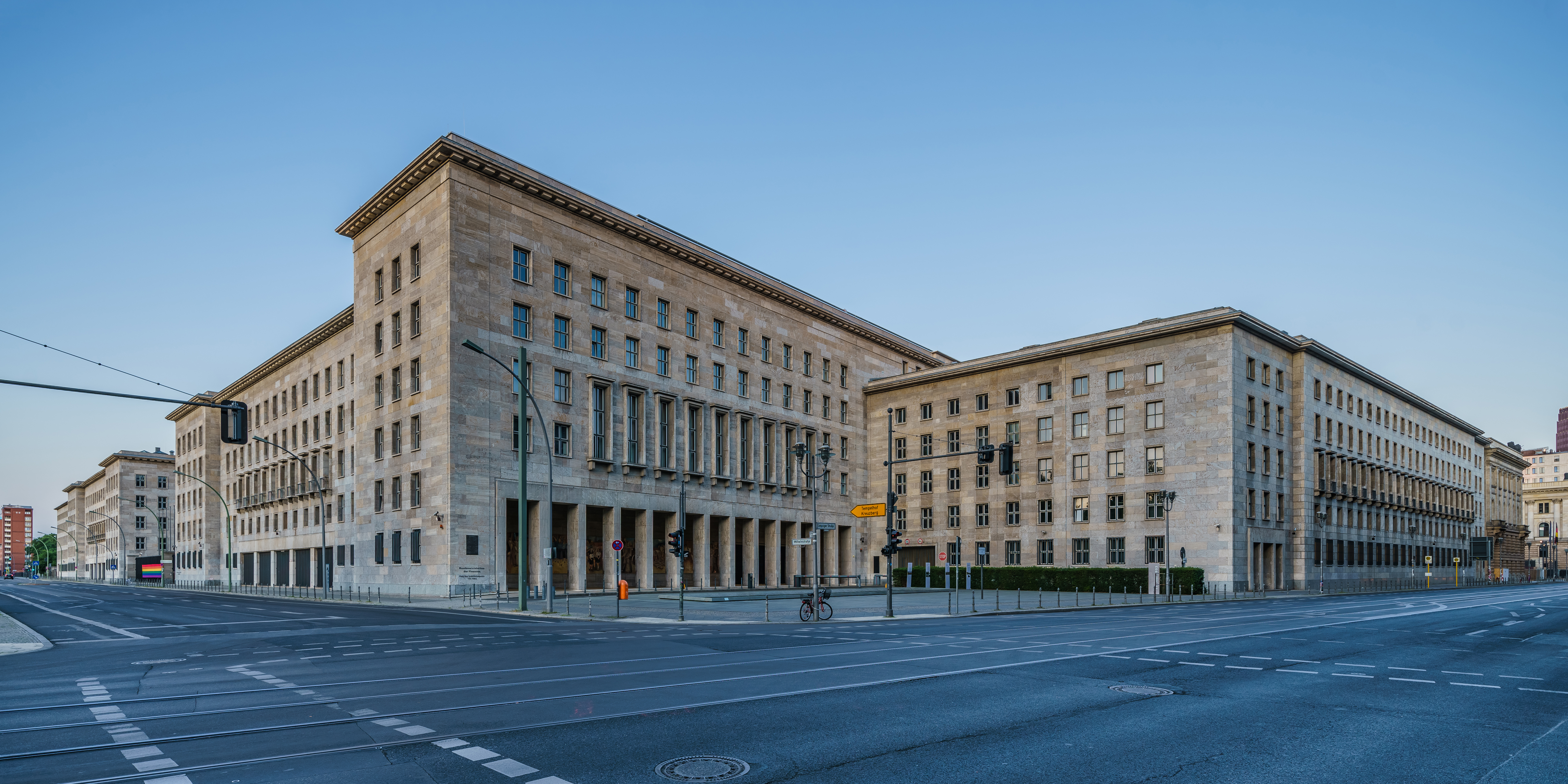
- The Detlev-Rohwedder-Haus on Wilhelmstraße, headquarters of the Federal Ministry of Finance since August 1999. Formerly the Air Ministry headquarters building and an example of classical-modern architecture.

Agency overview
- Formed: 14 July 1879; 147 years ago (Reichsschatzamt)
- Jurisdiction: Federal Republic of Germany
- Headquarters: Detlev-Rohwedder-Haus Wilhelmstraße 97, 10117 Berlin; 52°30′31″N 13°23′3″E
- Employees: 1,965 (ministry)
- Annual budget: €8.742 billion (2021)
- Minister responsible: Lars Klingbeil, Federal Minister of Finance
- Agency executives: Katja Hessel, Parliamentary State Secretary; Florian Toncar, Parliamentary State Secretary; Steffen Saebisch, State Secretary; Werner Gatzer, State Secretary
- Parent agency: Cabinet of Germany
- Child agencies: Bundeszollverwaltung; Federal Central Tax Office
- Website: www.bundesfinanzministerium.de

The Federal Ministry of Finance (German: Bundesministerium der Finanzen, pronounced [ˈbʊndəsminɪsˌteːʁiʊm deːɐ̯ fiˈnantsn̩]; abbreviated BMF) is the cabinet-level finance ministry of Germany, with its seat at the Detlev-Rohwedder-Haus in Berlin and a secondary office in Bonn.

== History ==
In German politics, the Ministry of Finance beside the Interior, Foreign, Justice and Defence ministries is counted as one of the "classical portfolios" (denoted by the definite article der), which were also part of the first German government under Otto von Bismarck following the Unification of 1871.

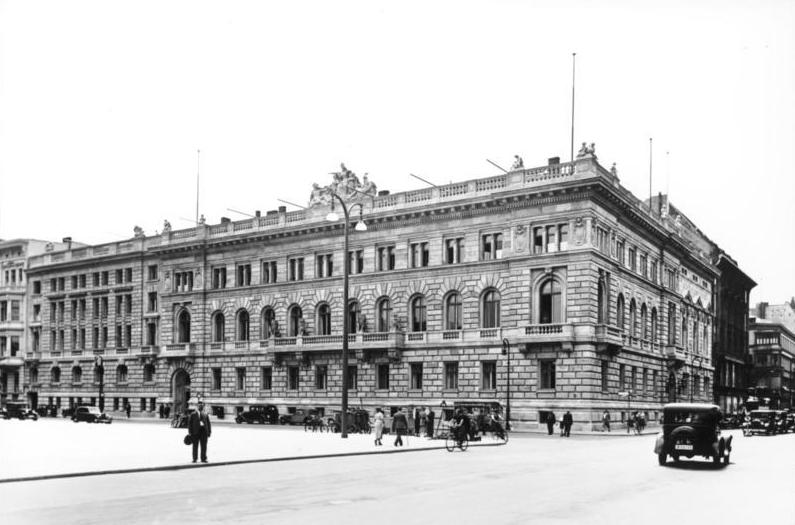
Pre-war ministry on Wilhelmplatz, Berlin, 1930s

Before 1919, the individual states of the German Empire administered direct taxes. In July 1879, the Imperial Treasury (Reichsschatzamt) was established as an independent central finance authority. It was initially led by an undersecretary and later by a state secretary.

After World War I, the newly established Weimar Republic had to face huge reparations and a fiscal emergency. On 21 March 1919, President Friedrich Ebert issued a decree converting the Imperial Treasury into the Reich Ministry of Finance, which assumed responsibility for nationwide tax collection. Besides a Reich Treasury Ministry (Reichsschatzministerium) was established for the administration of the federal property, both agencies were merged in 1923.

Already in the German cabinet of Chancellor Franz von Papen, Undersecretary Lutz Graf Schwerin von Krosigk was appointed Finance Minister in 1932, an office he held throughout the Nazi era until 1945. The ministry played a vital role in financing the German re-armament, in the "Aryanization" of Jewish property ("Reich Flight Tax"), German war economy, and the plundering of occupied countries in World War II. The budget deficit had already reached heady heights on the eve of the war, aggrandised by hidden Mefo and Oeffa bill financing. In turn, saving banks and credit institutions were obliged to sign war bonds while price stability was enforced by government intervention and the German public was called up to bank surplus money.

After World War II the ministry was re-established in 1949 and renamed the West German Bundesministerium der Finanzen. In 1999, the ministry moved its main office from Bonn to the Detlev-Rohwedder-Haus in Berlin.

During the period of Reunification in the 1990s', the Ministry of Finance headed by Theo Waigel, refused to return eight buildings in East Germany belonging to six Austrian Jewish citizens / NS victims. Allgemeine Judische Wochenzeitung; 10 September 1992; "Expropriation through the back door; German Government adds to its coffers / Loopholes in German bureaucracy make Injustice permanent." ("Enteignung durch die Hintertur; Der Bund bereichert sich / Winkelzuge deutscher Burocratie schreiben Unrecht fest").

== Structure and function ==
The Ministry is the supreme federal authority in revenue administration and governs a number of subordinate federal, intermediate, and local authorities such as the Federal Centre for Data Processing and Information Technology (ZIVIT). The Ministry's wider portfolio includes public-law agencies and corporations such as the Federal Finance Regulator (BaFin) and Real Estate regulatory bodies. The finance minister is the only cabinet minister who can veto a decision of the government if it would lead to additional expenditure. The German newspaper FAZ stated, the Ministry of Finance is the most important Ministry in the German government.

The Finance Ministry is responsible for all aspects of tax and revenue policy in Germany and plays a significant role in European Union policy. It has nine directorates-general:

- Directorate-General Z (Central Services): Deals with all ministerial organizational matters, including human resources, IT, occupational training, management, and administration
- Directorate-General L (Leading, Strategy and communication): Coordinates strategy development and policy planning to advance decision-making processes, also manages the ministry's relations with the parliament and federal cabinet
- Directorate-General I (Fiscal and Macroeconomic Affairs): Determines the strategic focus of the Ministry's fiscal policy instruments, forecasts public budget trends and conducts macroeconomic research
- Directorate-General II (Federal Budget): Responsible for drawing up the federal budget by calculating revenue and spending for each government policy area.
- Directorate-General III (Customs and Excise): Responsible for levying customs and excise duties, as well as for monitoring cross-border goods traffic.
- Directorate-General IV (Taxation): Together with the other member states of the EU, the Ministry works to improve coordination among the different systems of taxes.
- Directorate-General V (Financial Relations and Law): Coordinates financial relations between central, regional and local governments. Also responsible for public law, legal affairs, and handling proceedings before Germany's Federal Constitutional Court and the European courts. Furthermore, this directorate-general deals with settlement of war burdens, compensation for National Socialist injustices, and unresolved property issues in eastern Germany
- Directorate-General VII (Financial Market Policy): Manages the federal debt, including issuance of securities for financial markets and private investors which ensure the budgeted volume of credit is obtained when needed and at market rates. Also responsible for the Bundesbank and the European Central Bank. Shapes the legal framework for financial markets through its capital market policy and exercises legal supervision over the German financial watchdog agency BaFin.
- Directorate-General VIII (Privatisation): Sets the policy for managing state holdings which is then undertaken by individual government departments. Operates a real estate institute that markets properties that the German Government no longer needs, and operates standardised facility management for federal properties.
- Directorate-General E (European Policy): Responsible for coordinating the German Government's European economic and financial policy under the EU Treaty.

== Subordinate agencies ==
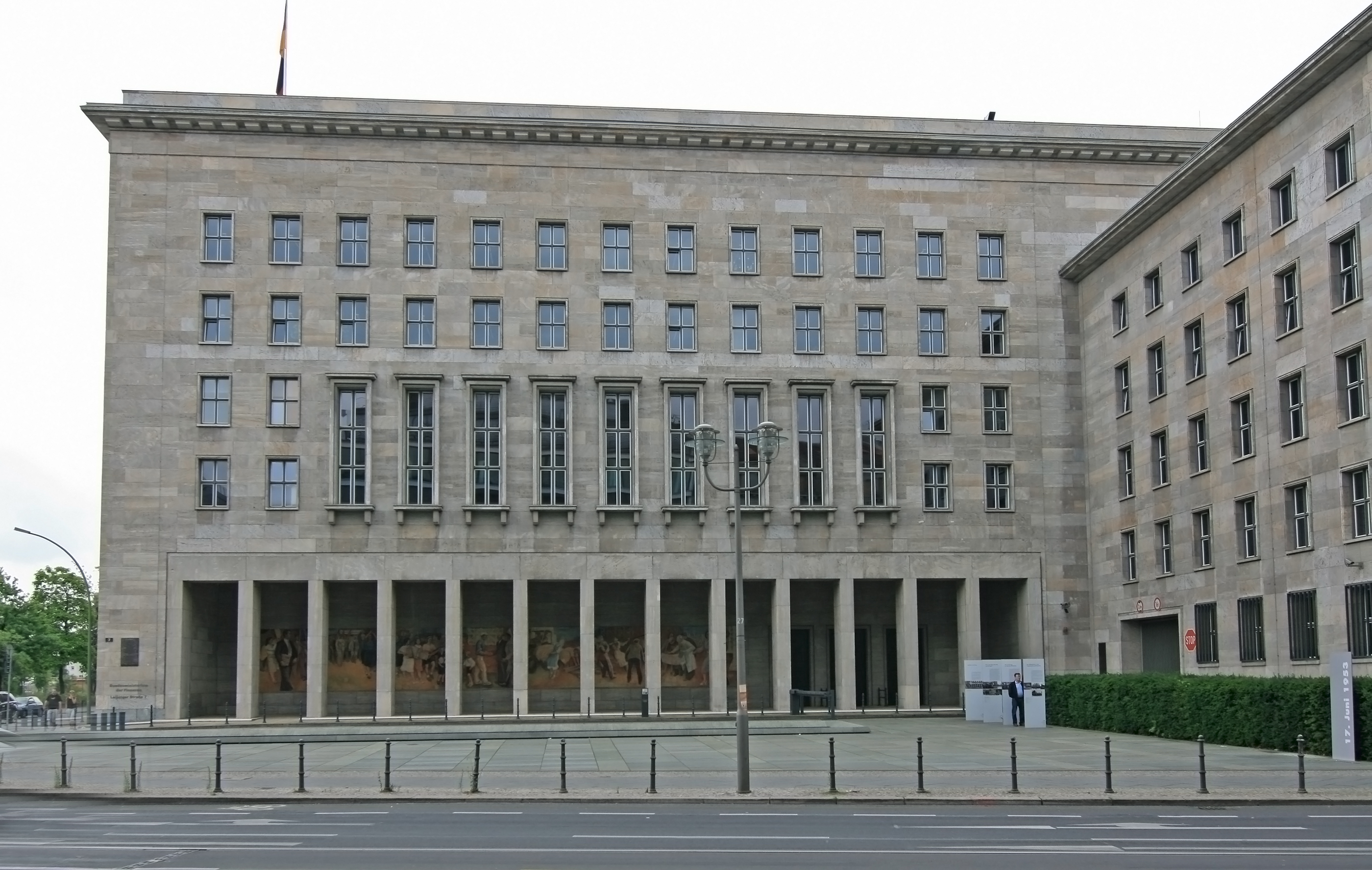
Detlev-Rohwedder-Haus, Berlin headquarters

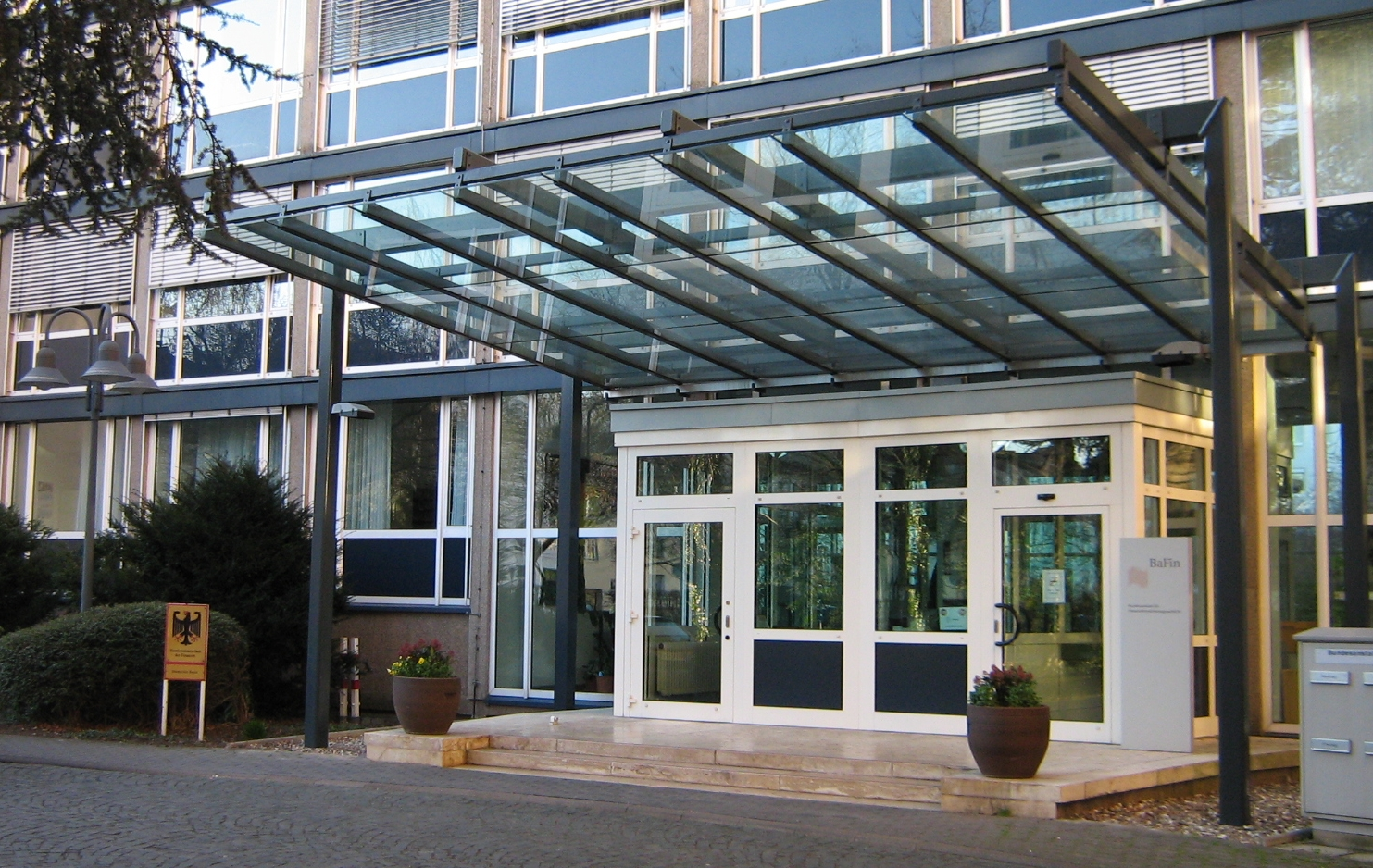
Entrance to the headquarters in Bonn

The federal ministry directly governs the following agencies:

- Higher federal authorities
  - Federal Central Tax Office (BZSt)
  - Federal Office of Central Services and Unresolved Property Issues (BADV)
  - Federal Equalisation of Burdens Office (BAA)
  - Federal Spirits Monopoly Administration (BfB)
- Intermediate and local authorities
  - Customs Administration
    - Customs Investigation Bureau (ZKA)
    - 5 Federal finance offices
    - 43 local customs offices
    - 8 local customs investigation offices
- Other agencies
  - Centre for Data Processing and Information Technology (ZIVIT)
  - Training and Knowledge Centre (BWZ)

Legally independent entities in the Ministry's wider portfolio include:

- Federal Financial Supervisory Authority (BaFin)
- Financial Market Stabilisation Fund (SoFFin)
- Federal Agency for Financial Market Stabilisation (FMSA)
- Institute for Federal Real Estate (BImA)
- Federal Institute for Special Tasks Arising from Unification (BvS)
- Federal Posts and Telecommunications Agency (BAnst PT)
  - Federal Pensions Service for Posts and Telecommunications (BPS-PT)
  - Posts and Telecommunications Accident Fund (UKPT)
  - Museum Foundation for Posts and Telecommunications (MusStiftPT)

== Federal Ministers of Finance ==
Political Party: CSU CDU FDP SPD

Name (Born-Died)		Portrait	Party	Term of Office		Chancellor (Cabinet)
1	Fritz Schäffer (1888–1967)		CSU	20 September 1949	29 October 1957	Adenauer (I • II)
2	Franz Etzel (1902–1970)		CDU	29 October 1957	14 November 1961	Adenauer (III)
3	Heinz Starke (1911–2001)		FDP	14 November 1961	19 November 1962	Adenauer (IV)
4	Rolf Dahlgrün (1908–1969)		FDP	14 December 1962	28 October 1966	Adenauer (V); Erhard (I • II)
5	Kurt Schmücker (1919–1996)		CDU	8 November 1966	30 November 1966	Erhard (II)
6	Franz Josef Strauß (1915–1988)		CSU	1 December 1966	21 October 1969	Kiesinger (I)
7	Alex Möller (1903–1985)		SPD	22 October 1969	13 May 1971	Brandt (I)
8	Karl Schiller (1911–1994)		SPD	13 May 1971	7 July 1972	Brandt (I)
9	Helmut Schmidt (1918–2015)		SPD	7 July 1972	1 May 1974	Brandt (I • II)
10	Hans Apel (1932–2011)		SPD	16 May 1974	15 February 1978	Schmidt (I • II)
11	Hans Matthöfer (1925–2009)		SPD	16 February 1978	28 April 1982	Schmidt (II • III)
12	Manfred Lahnstein (b. 1937)		SPD	28 April 1982	1 October 1982	Schmidt (III)
13	Gerhard Stoltenberg (1928–2001)		CDU	4 October 1982	21 April 1989	Kohl (I • II • III)
14	Theodor Waigel (b. 1939)		CSU	21 April 1989	27 October 1998	Kohl (III • IV • V)
15	Oskar Lafontaine (b. 1943)		SPD	27 October 1998	18 March 1999	Schröder (I)
Werner Müller was acting Federal Minister from 18 March to 12 April 1999.
16	Hans Eichel (b. 1941)		SPD	12 April 1999	22 November 2005	Schröder (I • II)
17	Peer Steinbrück (b. 1947)		SPD	22 November 2005	28 October 2009	Merkel (I)
18	Wolfgang Schäuble (1942–2023)		CDU	28 October 2009	24 October 2017	Merkel (II • III)
Peter Altmaier was acting Federal Minister from 24 October 2017 to 14 March 2018.
19	Olaf Scholz (b. 1958)		SPD	14 March 2018	8 December 2021	Merkel (IV)
20	Christian Lindner (b. 1979)		FDP	8 December 2021	7 November 2024	Scholz (I)
21	Jörg Kukies (b. 1968)		SPD	7 November 2024	6 May 2025	Scholz (I)
22	Lars Klingbeil (b. 1978)		SPD	6 May 2025	incumbent	Merz (I)

== See also ==
- German budget process
