= German disarmament =

Downsizing of the German military after WWI

The disarmament of Germany after World War I was decided upon by Allied leadership at the Paris Peace Conference. It was viewed, at the time, as a way to prevent further conflict with Germany and as punishment for Germany's role in World War I. The reduction of Germany's significant manufacturing capacity was one of the goals.

== Background ==
The Treaty of Versailles placed several restrictions on German ownership of munitions and other arms and limited the army to just 100,000 men. Under the terms of the treaty, poison gas, tanks, submarines, and heavy artillery were prohibited to German forces, and Germany could not import or export "war material" (a vague term that was not clearly defined). Germany did not fully accept the terms of the treaty nor even the fact of its own defeat in World War I.

Germany was given two months to surrender all prohibited war material. Disarmament began under the Inter-Allied Military Control Commission on 10 January 1920. The Allies created a list of war material that included flamethrowers, shells, rifles, grenades, armored cars, artillery, fuses and detonators. The list broadly included uniforms, field ambulances, telephones, gas masks, signalling equipment, and optical instruments. This published list was called the "Blue Book".

The German government objected to the broad scope of the Blue Book, which had defined war material so expansively as to include cooking utensils and vehicles needed for basic economic activity and transportation. Responding to this complaint, the Allies decided to sell non-military goods and credit the proceeds as reparations. The Fehrenbach government complained again in January 1921, but the IAMCC would not alter the list, and even expanded it once again in August 1921 to include German uniforms, pants, backpacks, jackets, and tents, which were sold, and helmets, which were destroyed.

Harold Nicolson wrote in 1919 "It will be too awful if, after winning the war we are to lose the peace".

== Competing definitions ==
The French and British had different views of what enforced disarmament of Germany meant. The process brought the post-War strategies of the Allies into conflict. The French literature on post-1919 Germany calls it "moral disarmament" based on the French position that the threat of Germany, a combination of geographic, economic, ideological, and demographic factors, was not resolved by the armistice and Versailles Treaty. French political views emphasized the location of Germany on France's border, the nationalist sentiments that had spurred the country to war, and its technical and economic capabilities, still strong, even after the First World War. Disarmament was, to the French, an opportunity to dismantle German capabilities. Not only the physical disarmament, but for the French, a "moral disarmament" was seen as essential for the security of France. In contrast, the British view was one of "continental containment and engagement."

=== French position ===
German discipline, order, and nationalism were a threat, from the French viewpoint, that had been hardened by the events of the war. French intelligence believed that German militarism or 'the Prussian mentality' had not been defeated in the outcome of World War I. They believed the Germans would breach the terms of Versailles as the Prussians had the Treaties of Tilsit after the War of the Fourth Coalition that had called for the Prussian forces to limit their troop strength.

France wanted Germany to abandon not only its arms but also the intent to wage war. The French took any German objection to disarmament as proof that Germany had not achieved the "moral disarmament" they required, the abandonment of "the old warrior spirit". According to French intelligence, the Germans were unable to "embrace defeat", and the French considered any attempt to restore the German economy and every minor infraction as another step toward war. In 1920 French intelligence reported the Germany could mobilize over 2,000,000 men from non-military forces like the police and private organizations like the Freikorps, well in excess of the 100,000 limit placed on the German army. These numbers were based on figures given by the organizations themselves and may have been inflated. However, by 1923, significant efforts in Germany were underway supporting clandestine weapons production and military training.

=== British position ===
After the war, Britain was more focused on rivalries with the United States, Bolshevik Russia, and French continental superiority. Their policy of "continental containment and engagement" was in support of a quick disarmament that would allow them to return to the more pressing matters of managing their national interests.

The IAMCC Armaments Sub-commission was run by the British Major-General Francis Bingham, a staunch advocate of the destruction of German armaments, which he considered "a matter of urgency".

For the British, German disarmament on the scale of short-term destruction or removal of military material and limits on army size would suffice. Sir Maurice Hankey complained of overly strict enforcement of Peace Terms that would "deprive Germany of the physical force required to resist external attack (which is more likely to come from Bolshevism than any other quarter)".

In contrast with the French, who desired that Germany abandon any future military ambitions, Sir Henry Wilson espoused in February 1919 the view that Germany needed to be "sufficiently strong to be no temptation to the French!" In the Fontainebleau Memorandum, Lloyd George rejected the French arguments:

France itself has demonstrated that those who say you can make Germany so feeble that she will never be able to hit back are utterly wrong ... You may strip Germany of her colonies, reduce her armaments to a mere police force and her navy to that of a fifth-rate power; all the same in the end if she feels that she has been unjustly treated in the peace of 1919 she will find means of exacting retribution.

== Chemical disarmament ==
At the end of World War I much of Germany's wartime production capabilities were still intact. Germany's chemical industry was of particular concern. Germany's production of propellant had increased twenty-fold between 1914 and 1918 under the Hindenburg Program. Dyestuffs firms had been converted to manufacture explosives and nitrogen compounds. The Interessengemeinschaft (IG) was an agreement that pooled the resources of eight existing pre-war dye firms in 1916. Their principal factories, located near explosives and munitions plants, supplied the pre-war explosives and powder companies with sulphuric acid and other needed components. Under the terms of the agreement, the IG and powder interests would join interests in a new agreement after the war (with German victory presumed), giving the IG a monopoly in the production of high explosives. This was cancelled under the terms of the Versailles Treaty, but it was not enough to prevent German ambitions to integrate the industrial capacity developed during the war into their military plans. The firms merged to form I.G. Farben in 1925.

The vast industry presented challenges from a disarmament perspective because its industrial capacity had not been damaged during the war and the chemicals it produced were dual use. Phosgene, picric acid, and arsenic were intermediate components needed for production of dyes, pharmaceuticals, and other goods intended for commercial markets. Despite the productive civilian uses, the Allied position expressed in 1919 was "every chemical factory must be regarded as a potential arsenal", but the elimination of Germany's chemicals production capacity was hardly a foregone conclusion.

== Treaty violation and rearmament ==
Using front organizations such as glider clubs for training pilots and sporting clubs, and Nazi SA militia groups for teaching infantry combat techniques, front companies like MEFO for acquiring forbidden weapons, German rearmament began on a small, secret, and informal basis shortly after the treaty was signed, but it was openly and massively expanded after the Nazi Party came to power in 1933.

== See also ==
- German rearmament
