= Sulfotep =

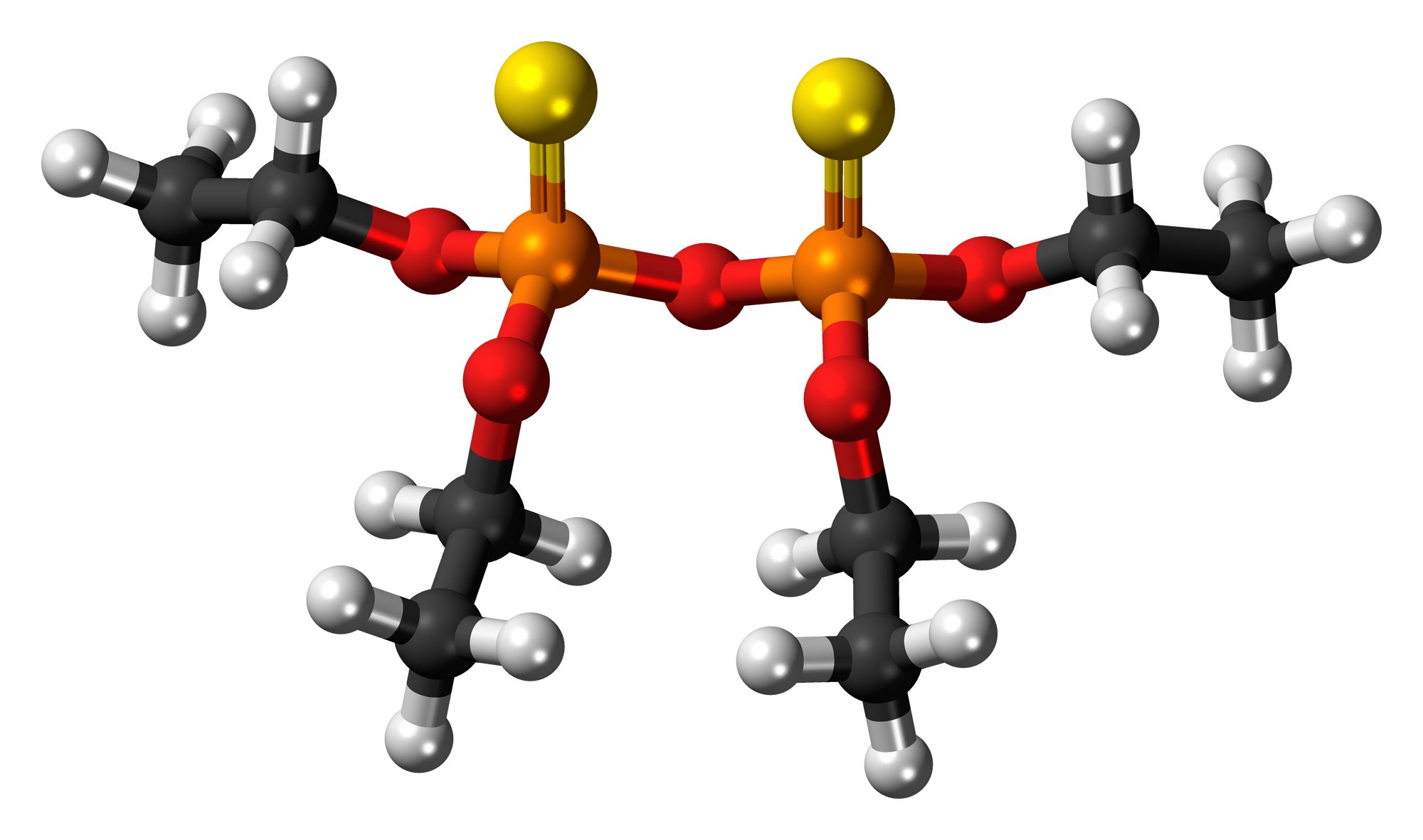

Names
- Preferred IUPAC name O^{1},O^{1},O^{3},O^{3}-Tetraethyl 1,3-dithiodiphosphate
- Other names Sulfotep, Dithiophos, Dithion, Bladafum, Dithiofos, Dithione, Dithiotep, Pirofos, TEDP

Identifiers
CAS Number	3689-24-5
3D model (JSmol)	Interactive image
ChEBI	CHEBI:38945
ChEMBL	ChEMBL3182477
ChemSpider	18280
DrugBank	DB11497
ECHA InfoCard	100.020.905
EC Number	222-995-2
PubChem CID	19395
RTECS number	XN4375000
UNII	V41BK2EE8X
UN number	1704
CompTox Dashboard (EPA)	DTXSID7024328
- InChI: InChI=1S/C8H20O5P2S2/c1-5-9-14(16,10-6-2)13-15(17,11-7-3)12-8-4/h5-8H2,1-4H3 Key: XIUROWKZWPIAIB-UHFFFAOYSA-N
- SMILES: CCOP(=S)(OCC)OP(=S)(OCC)OCC

Properties
Chemical formula	C_{8}H_{20}O_{5}P_{2}S_{2}
Molar mass	322.31 g·mol^{−1}
Appearance	Pale yellow liquid
Odor	Garlic-like
Density	1.196 g/cm^{3}
Boiling point	136 to 139 °C (277 to 282 °F; 409 to 412 K) at 2 mm Hg
Solubility in water	30 mg/L
Vapor pressure	0.0002 mmHg (20°C)

Hazards
- Occupational safety and health (OHS/OSH)
Main hazards	Poison
- GHS labelling
Pictograms	(GHS06: Toxic) (GHS09: Environmental hazard)
Signal word	Danger
Hazard statements	H300, H310, H410
Precautionary statements	P262, P264, P270, P273, P280, P301+P316, P302+P352, P316, P321, P330, P361+P364, P391, P405, P501
NFPA 704 (fire diamond)	4 1 0
Flash point	−18 °C (0 °F; 255 K)
- Lethal dose or concentration (LD, LC)
LD_{50} (median dose)	22 mg/kg (mouse, oral); 25 mg/kg (rabbit, oral); 5 mg/kg (dog, oral); 5 mg/kg (rat, oral)
LC_{50} (median concentration)	38 mg/m^{3} (rat, 4 hr); 40 mg/m^{3} (mouse, 4 hr)
- NIOSH (US health exposure limits)
PEL (Permissible)	TWA 0.2 mg/m^{3} [skin]
IDLH (Immediate danger)	10 mg/m^{3}
- Except where otherwise noted, data are given for materials in their standard state (at 25 °C [77 °F], 100 kPa). Infobox references

Sulfotep (also known as tetraethyldithiopyrophosphate and TEDP) is a pesticide commonly used in greenhouses as a fumigant. The substance is also known as Dithione, Dithiophos, and many other names. Sulfotep has the molecular formula C_{8}H_{20}O_{5}P_{2}S_{2} and belongs to the organophosphate class of chemicals. It has a cholinergic effect, involving depression of the cholinesterase activity of the peripheral and central nervous system of insects. The transduction of signals is disturbed at the synapses that make use of acetylcholine. Sulfotep is a mobile oil that is pale yellow-colored and smells like garlic. It is primarily used as an insecticide.

== History ==
Sulfotep was first commercially launched by Bayer in 1946. The first time that tetraethyl dithiopyrophosphate was registered to be used in the United States was in 1951. A Registration Standard for the chemical was issued by the Environmental Protection Agency in September 1988. Plans were made in 1999 by the Environmental Protection Agency to stop production of it by September 30, 2002, and to outlaw the use and distribution of products containing it by September 30, 2004.

== Chemistry ==
=== Synthesis ===
Sulfotep is synthesized by a reaction of tetraethyl pyrophosphate (TEPP) with sulfur. TEPP itself was first synthesized by Wladimir Moschnin and Philippe de Clermont in 1854. TEPP is made by a reaction of diethyl chlorophosphate with water to substitute the chloro group with a hydroxyl group. The product can react with another molecule of diethylchlorophosphate to form the ester, TEPP. In this reaction, pyridine is often used to neutralize the hydrochloric acid byproduct.

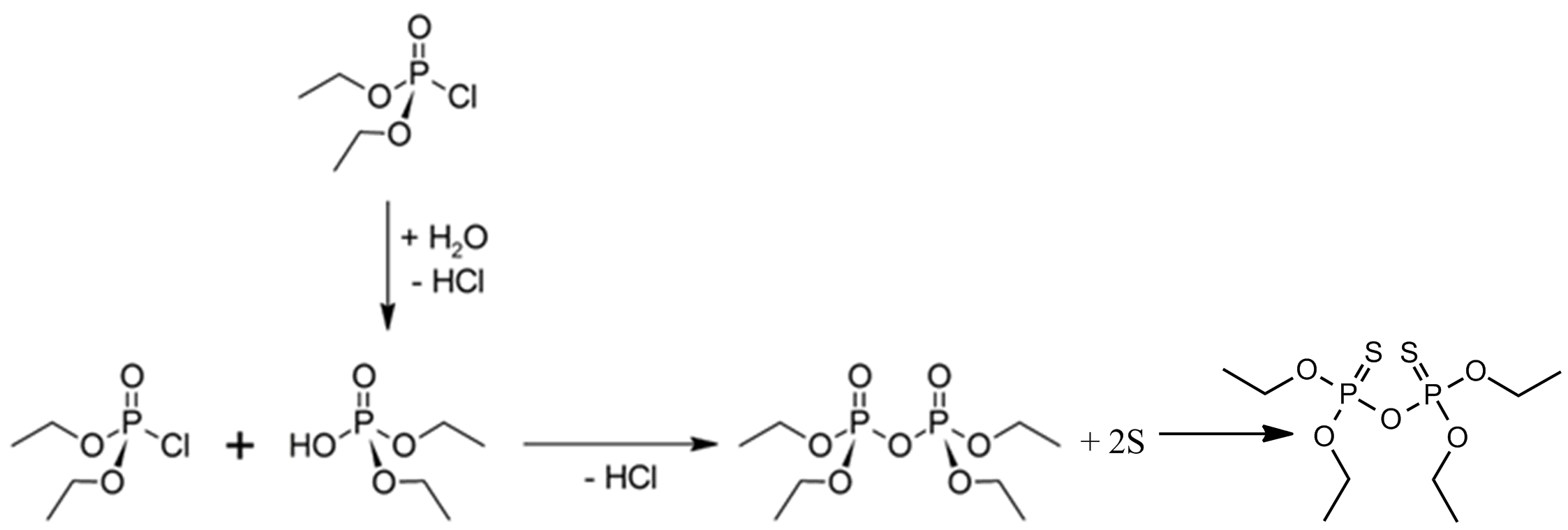
Synthesis of sulfotep

An alternative route to TEPP can be a reaction of diethyl chlorothiophosphate an aqueous solution of sodium bicarbonate (Na_{2}CO_{3}).

=== Properties ===
When heated to a temperature that is high enough for sulfotep to decompose, it gives off fumes of phosphorus and sulfur oxides, which are highly toxic. It can explode if containers of it are heated, and it can burn, although it does not do so easily. The chemical can also polymerize explosively. The chemical also reacts to form toxic and flammable gases in the presence of hydrides and other reducing agents. It is able to corrode iron. When it does this, it can release hydrogen gas. The chemical has a specific gravity of 1.196 at 77 °F (25 °C) and its vapor density is 13.17 grams per liter at 25 °C (77 °F). Its melting point is 88 °C (190 °F) and its boiling point is between 272 °F (133 °C) and 282 °F (139 °C) at 2 mmHg. The chemical's sorption coefficient is 2.87 Log L/kg. Its Henry's Law constant is 0.000175 at 20 °C (68 °F). Its octanol-water partition coefficient is 3.9804 Log L/kg. Tetraethyl dithiopyrophosphate's diffusion coefficient in air is 0.015 cm^{2} per second and its diffusion coefficient in water is 0.0000055 cm^{2}.

Sulfotep's flash point is 178 °C (352 °F) and its enthalpy of vaporization is 59.4 kilojoules per mole. Its surface tension is 423 dynes per centimeter. The chemical has no Rule of 5 violations. Its diffusivity in water is 0.63 × 10^{−5} cm^{2} per second. It is miscible with a large number of organic solvents, including methyl chloride and acetone and its solubility in water is 30 milligrams per liter at 20 °C (68 °F).

The alkaline and neutral hydrolysis of sulfotep results in the release of ethanol, phosphoric acid, and hydrogen sulfide.

== Applications ==
Sulfotep has applications as an insecticide, miticide, and acaricide. However, because it does not leave behind a residue, it is less effective at these roles than DDT. However, it is about as effective as the insecticide parathion. Its use is restricted to greenhouses and ornamental plants. When the chemical is used as an insecticide, it is in the form of an impregnated smoke fumigant. Sulfotep is used in greenhouses as a fumigant formulation to control aphids, spider mites, whiteflies and thrips. It is formulated as impregnated material in smoke generators containing 14 to 15% active ingredient. Smoke generators are placed in the greenhouses and then ignited using inserted sparklers to generate a thick white smoke for fumigation.

Sulfotep kills spider mites, mealybugs, whiteflies, and aphids. However, the chemical is not phytotoxic, unlike tetraethyl pyrophosphate. However, it occasionally causes minor damage to plants, such as the slight puckering and cupping of leaves. During several tests in the late 1940s, it was found to be the most toxic of several chemicals to whiteflies on vegetables, two-spotted spider mites on roses, and mealybugs on numerous plants.

A mixture containing 5% sulfotep at the concentration of 0.5 grams of phosphate per 1000 cubic feet was found in tests in the late 1940s to kill 100% of nonresistant two-spotted spider mites and 68-97% of resistant two-spotted spider mites. Sulfotep aerosols killed 100% of the populations of a large number of insects, but only killed 98% of mealybugs in the same tests. 88% of nonresistant spider mites can be killed be two minutes of exposure to a mixture containing 5% of the chemical, 98-99% can be killed after five to ten minutes, and all can be killed after 15 minutes.

== Mechanism of action ==
Sulfotep, just as all organophosphate pesticides, irreversibly inactivates acetylcholinesterase, which is essential to nerve function in insects, humans, and many other animals. Acetylcholinesterase normally hydrolyses acetylcholine after it was released in the synapse. When the acetylcholine is not degraded, it accumulates in the synaptic cleft. Thus, it keeps on stimulating the nerve.

== Metabolism ==
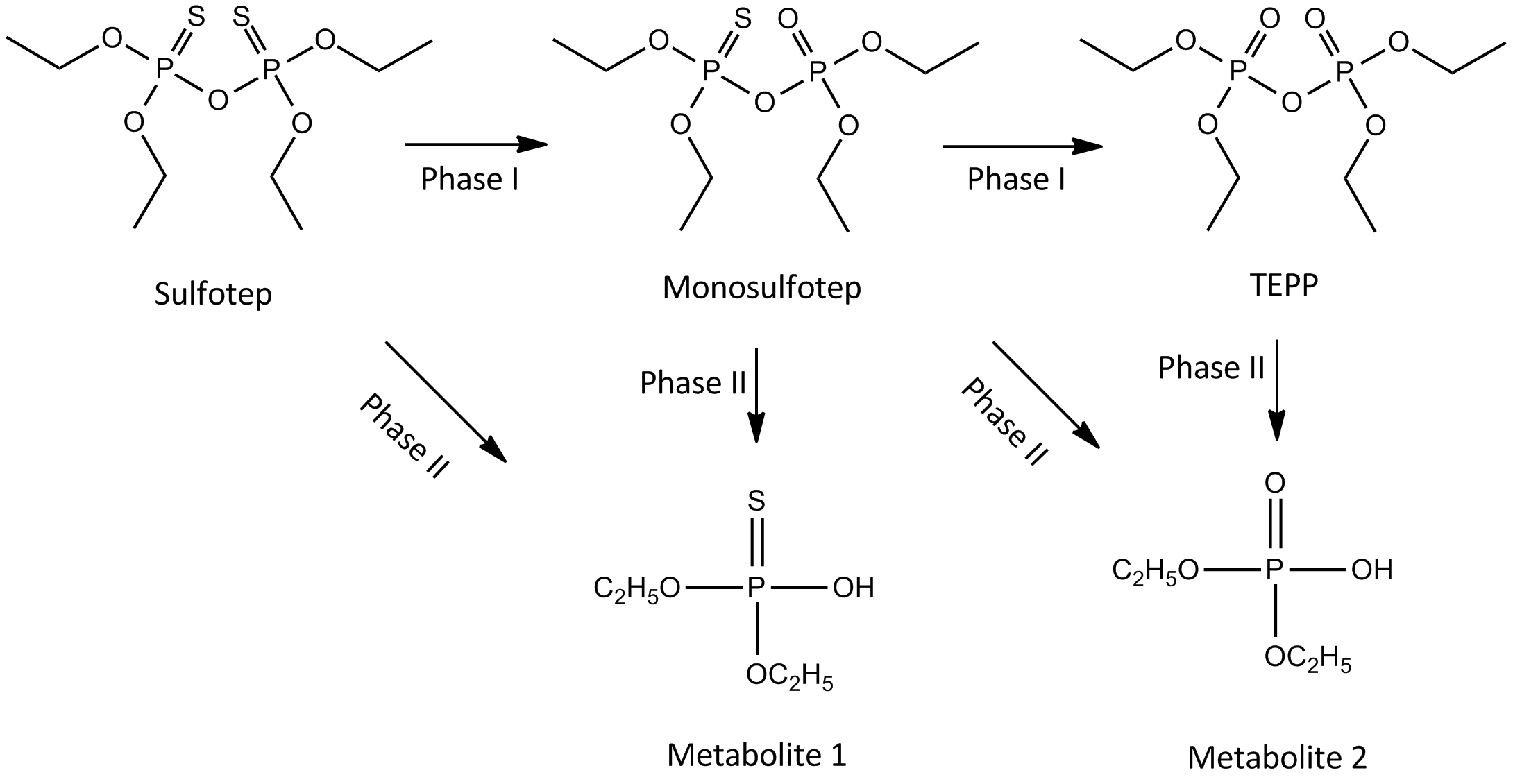
Metabolism of sulfotep

=== Uptake ===
Sulfotep is taken up well both orally, dermally as well as through inhalation. A few different organizations determined a maximum concentration sulfotep in the air. The maximum allowed concentration is 0.2 mg/m^{3}.

=== Phase I ===
Sulfotep is desulfurated by either cytochrome P450 or the FAD-containing monooxygenases. In this reaction, the sulfur is replaced by oxygen, as seen in figure 2. The metabolites formed are monosulfotep and tetraethyl pyrophosphate (TEPP). To accomplish these reactions, a phospho-oxithirane ring is formed, which is highly reactive. This ring is thought to bind to acetylcholinesterase and cause toxicity.

=== Phase II ===
The two Phase I metabolites are further transformed through a hydrolysis-reaction mediated by a type A-esterase. The products formed are O,O-diethyldithiophosphate and O,O-diethylphosphate.

=== Excretion ===
An experiment in rats who were once given 0.4 mg radioactive phosphor-labelled sulfotep orally, has shown that sulfotep is excreted by both the kidneys (urine) and the liver (bile). The substance is completely metabolised. Two metabolites are found in the urine and faeces. The radioactivity showed that 85-91% was excreted in urine and 5-6% in the faeces.

- 88-96% metabolite 1: O,O-diethyldithiophosphate
- 4-12% metabolite 2: O,O-diethylphosphate

== Toxicity ==
=== Acute toxic effects on animals ===
Sulfotep is toxic to some wildlife, including fish and aquatic invertebrates. It is also assumed by the Environmental Protection Agency to be toxic to birds.

Exposure	Toxic level
Inhalation	mg/m^{3}
Mouse 1 hr	155
Mouse 4 hr	40
Rat 1 hr	160-330
Rat 4 hr	38-59
Oral LD_{50}	mg/kg
Cat	3
Dog	5
Mouse	21.5-29.4
Rabbit	25
Rat	5-13.8
Dermal LD_{50}	mg/kg
Rat 4 hr	262
Rat 7 d	65
Intravenous LD_{50}	μg/kg
Mouse	300
Intramuscular LD_{50}	μg/kg
Mouse	500
Rat	55
Intraperitoneal LD_{50}	μg/kg
Mouse	940
Rat	6600
Subcutaneous LD_{50}	mg/kg
Mouse	8

Surviving animals completely recovered in 1–4 days.

=== Chronic and sub-chronic toxicity ===
A long-term exposure to a low concentration showed no toxicity. This was tested in rats. They were exposed to different concentrations of sulfotep. Exposed to the highest concentration of 2.83 mg/m^{3} for six hours a day, five days a week for 12 weeks, there was no change in appearance, behavior or body weight. The plasma cholinesterase activity decreased and the weight of the lungs of female rats increased. The red blood cell acetylcholinesterase activity was not affected. At lower concentrations, there were no changes at all.

The rats were orally exposed to 0, 5, 10, 20 or 50 ppm sulfotep for three months. Only their plasma cholinesterase activity and RBC acetylcholinesterase activity were decreased. No further symptoms were observed. Dogs who were orally exposed to 0, 0.5, 3, 5, 15 or 75 ppm (equivalent to 0–3.07 mg/kg/day) for 13 weeks, ate less and lost weight. The plasma cholinesterase activity was already affected by a sulfotep concentration of 3 ppm (or higher). Red blood cell-acetylcholinesterase was decreased at 75 ppm. Diarrhea and vomiting occasionally occurred at 15 ppm, but were common at 75 ppm. The brain cholinesterase activity was unaffected.

=== Poisoning symptoms and treatment ===
According to the Occupational Safety and Health Administration, the upper limit on exposure of sulfotep to human skin is 0.2 milligrams per cubic meter.

Sulfotep causes an organophosphate poisoning. This means that it had an effect on the activity of cholinesterase. There are differences for the indications of a sulfotep poisoning between inhalation, ingestion, intake by the skin and intake by the eyes. However, examples of poisoned greenhouse workers teach us an overall route of symptoms for a sulfotep poisoning. Within the first hour after a poisonous intake of sulfotep people often suffer from nausea or headaches. After some hours diarrhea and vomiting may occur. People who inhaled sulfotep are often disorientated and have difficulties to breathe. A poisonous dose may lead to a coma or death after 24 hours. The point at 24 hours after the poisoning is very important. If the dose is not lethal, the symptoms will slowly disappear after the point of 24 hours.

No embryotoxic or teratogenic effects occurred in tests. Neither were there any signs for carcinogenic effects. It was only mutagenic in one strain of S. typhimurium. In four other bacterial strains as well as in rats and mice it was not mutagenic at all.

There are two cases of acute toxicity known in man. The cholinesterase activity in these people was reduced. It took them 20 respectively 28 days to recover. The most important poisoning symptoms are shown in the following table.

Exposure	Symptoms	First aid treatment	Other treatments
Inhalation	blue skin, convulsions, dizziness, drowsiness, headache, sweating, labored breathing, nausea, unconsciousness, weakness	Fresh air or artificial respiration. Rest is important to prevent a respiration-arrest	
Ingestion	cramps in intestines, diarrhea, vomiting, confusion	Vomiting may only be induced in conscious people	Active charcoal to absorb compound. Atropine as an antidote
Eyes	irritation, redness, constriction of the pupil, loss of focus	Rinsing with plenty of water will lead to recovery of sight within 24 hours	
Skin (may be absorbed)	redness, irritation, sweating, twitching of the area	First rinse with plenty of water. Then wash the skin with water and soap	
