= List of highly toxic gases =

Many gases have toxic properties, which are often assessed using the LC_{50} (median lethal concentration) measure. In the United States, many of these gases have been assigned an NFPA 704 health rating of 4 (may be fatal) or 3 (may cause serious or permanent injury), and/or exposure limits (TLV, TWA/PEL, STEL, or REL) determined by the ACGIH professional association. Some, but by no means all, toxic gases are detectable by odor, which can serve as a warning. Among the best known toxic gases are carbon monoxide, chlorine, nitrogen dioxide and phosgene.

== Definitions ==
- Toxic: a chemical that has a median lethal concentration (LC_{50}) in air of more than 200 parts per million (ppm) but not more than 2,000 parts per million by volume of gas or vapor, or more than 2 milligrams per liter but not more than 20 milligrams per liter of mist, fume or dust, when administered by continuous inhalation for 1 hour (or less if death occurs within 1 hour) to albino rats weighing between 200 and 300 grams each.
- Highly Toxic: a gas that has a LC_{50} in air of 200 ppm or less.
- NFPA 704: Materials that, under emergency conditions, can cause serious or permanent injury are given a Health Hazard rating of 3. Their acute inhalation toxicity corresponds to those vapors or gases having LC_{50} values greater than 1,000 ppm but less than or equal to 3,000 ppm. Materials that, under emergency conditions, can be lethal are given a Health Hazard rating of 4. Their acute inhalation toxicity corresponds to those vapors or gases having LC_{50} values less than or equal to 1,000 ppm.

== List ==
Chemical name	Chemical formula	CAS number	NIOSH IDLH (ppm)	OSHA PEL / NIOSH REL / ACGIH TLV	NFPA 704 Ratings		LC_{50} (ppm)	Odor threshold (ppm)
Chemical name	Chemical formula	CAS number	NIOSH IDLH (ppm)	OSHA PEL / NIOSH REL / ACGIH TLV	Health	Special Hazard	LC_{50} (ppm)	Odor threshold (ppm)
Ammonia	NH_{3}	7664-41-7	300		3	COR	4230 (mouse, 1 hr)	
Arsenic pentafluoride	AsF_{5}	7784-36-3	5	NIOSH PEL TWA 0.001 ppm; REL Ceiling 0.0002 ppm (15 min)	4			
Arsine	AsH_{3}	7784-42-1	3	NIOSH REL (C) (15 min): 0.002 mg/m^{3}; OSHA PEL: 0.05 ppm; ACGIH (2006) TWA-TLV 0.05 ppm	4		120 (rat, 10 min)	
Bis(trifluoromethyl)peroxide	C_{2}F_{6}O_{2}	927-84-4	10					
Boron tribromide	BBr_{3}	10294-33-4	50	ACGIH (1990) / PEL Ceiling limit 1 ppm; AEGL-1: 0.33 ppm, AEGL-2: 1.7 ppm, AEGL-3: 5 ppm	3	~~W~~		
Boron trichloride	BCl_{3}	10294-34-5	25	No exposure limits have established; 2500 (TQ)	4	~~W~~	2541 (rat, 1 h)	
Boron trifluoride	BF_{3}	7637-07-2	25	OSHA, ACGIH (1962) 1 ppm ceiling	4		436 (4 h)	
Bromine	Br_{2}	7726-95-6	3	OSHA PEL 8-hr TWA: 0.1 ppm; ACGIH (1991) STEL-TLV 0.3 ppm	3	OX	174 (mice)	<0.01
Bromine chloride	BrCl	13863-41-7		1500 (TQ)	3	OX		
Bromomethane	CH_{3}Br	74-83-9	250	NIOSH PEL 20 ppm	3		302 (Rat, 8 h)	
Carbon monoxide	CO	630-08-0	1,200 (moderately toxic)	ACGIH (1989) TWA TLV 25 ppm; NIOSH 35 ppm; NIOSH 200 ppm Ceiling limit	3		4600/5000	
Chlorine	Cl_{2}	7782-50-5	10	ACGIH (1986) STEL-TLV 1 ppm	3	OX	433 (10 min), 250 (30 min)	1
Chlorine pentafluoride	ClF_{5}	13637-63-3		AEGL-2: 0.33 ppm, AEGL-3: 2.7 ppm			194 (Rat)	
Chlorine trifluoride	ClF_{3}	7790-91-2	12	ACGIH (1979) Ceiling limit 0.1 ppm	4	~~W~~+OX	95 (Rat, 4 h)	Inadequate odor
Chloropicrin (Note: Decomposes in gaseous form.)	CCl_{3}NO_{2}	76-06-2	2	ACGIH (1990) TWA-TLV 0.1 ppm	4		9.7 (Mouse, 4 h)	
Cyanogen	C_{2}N_{2}	460-19-5		ACGIH (1966) TWA-TLV 10 ppm	4			
Cyanogen chloride	CNCl	506-77-4		ACGIH (1977) ceiling limit 0.3 ppm	4			
Diazomethane	CH_{2}N_{2}	334-88-3	2	ACGIH (1970) TWA-TLV 0.2 ppm	4		175 (Cat, 10 min)	
Diborane	B_{2}H_{6}	19287-45-7	15	ACGIH (1990) TWA-TLV 0.1 ppm	4	~~W~~	40 (Rat, 4 h)	Inadequate odor
Dichloroacetylene (Note: Explodes in gaseous form.)	C_{2}Cl_{2}	7572-29-4		NIOSH REL 0.1 ppm Ceiling				
Dichlorosilane	H_{2}Cl_{2}Si	4109-96-0		2500 (TQ)	4	~~W~~	1785-2092	
Dimethylmercury	HgC_{2}H_{6}	593-74-8			4			
Ethylene oxide (anhydrous)	C_{2}H_{4}O	75-21-8	800	REL TWA <0.1 ppm, 5 ppm Ceiling	3		90 mg/L (fish, 24 h)	
Fluorine	F_{2}	7782-41-4		ACGIH (1970) STEL-TLV 2 ppm	4	OX		20 ppb
Formaldehyde (anhydrous)	CH_{2}O	50-00-0	20	NIOSH REL 0.016 ppm, Ceiling limit 0.1 ppm	3		333 (mouse, 2 h)	
Germane	GeH_{4}	7782-65-2		NIOSH REL 0.2 ppm	4		440 (mice 2 h)	
Hydrogen azide	HN_{3}	7782-79-8		NIOSH REL: 0.1 ppm Ceiling	4			
Hydrogen cyanide	HCN	74-90-8	50	PEL TWA 10 ppm; REL ST 4.7 ppm	4		503 (Rat, 5 min)	
Hydrogen fluoride	HF	7664-39-3	30	PEL TWA 3 ppm; REL TWA 3 ppm (2.5 mg/m^{3}); TWA 3 ppm	4	POI	LC_{Lo} 313 (rabbit, 7 hr)	
Hydrogen selenide	H_{2}Se	7783-07-5	1	ACGIH (1990) TWA-TLV 0.05 ppm	4		1.8 (G.Pig, 47 h)	
Hydrogen sulfide	H_{2}S	7783-06-4	100	NIOSH PEL: Ceiling 20 ppm; REL Ceiling 10 ppm; ACGIH (1990) STEL-TLV 15 ppm	4		444	0.3
Hydrogen telluride	H_{2}Te	7783-09-7			4			
Nickel tetracarbonyl	Ni(CO)_{4}	13463-39-3	2	NIOSH TWA PEL 0.001 ppm; ACGIH (1980) TWA-TLV 0.05 ppm	4		9.642	
Nitrogen dioxide	NO_{2}	10102-44-0	13	NIOSH PEL Ceiling 5 ppm; REL ST 1 ppm	3	OX	99 (mice, 1 h)	4
Osmium tetroxide	OsO_{4}	20816-12-0	0.001	NIOSH PEL TWA 0.0002 ppm; REL TWA 0.0002 ppm, ST 0.0006 ppm	3	OX	40 (rat, 4 h)	0.0019
Oxygen difluoride	OF_{2}	7783-41-7	0.5	NIOSH PEL TWA 0.05 ppm; REL Ceiling 0.05 ppm; ACGIH (1983) ceiling limit 0.05 ppm	4	OX	26.067 (Rhesus monkeys, 1 h)	0.5
Perchloryl fluoride	ClFO_{3}	7616-94-6	100	NIOSH PEL TWA 3 ppm; REL TWA 3 ppm, ST 6 ppm; ACGIH (1962) STEL-TLV 6 ppm	3	OX	385 (Rat, 4 h)	
Perfluoroisobutylene	C_{4}F_{8}	382-21-8		1.2 ppm			17 (Rat, 10 min)	
Phosgene	CCl_{2}O	75-44-5	2	NIOSH PEL TWA 0.1 ppm; REL TWA 0.1 ppm, Ceiling 0.2 ppm; ACGIH (1992) TWA-TLV 0.1 ppm	4			0.5 to 1.5
Phosphine	PH_{3}	7803-51-2	50	NIOSH 0.3 ppm time weighted average; ACGIH (1992) STEL-TLV 1 ppm	4		0.44 (Rat, 4 h)	
Phosphorus pentafluoride	PF_{5}	7647-19-0	25	TLV - TWA 0.25 ppm ACGIH & OSHA	4			
Selenium hexafluoride	SeF_{6}	7783-79-1	2	OSHA PEL, NIOSH REL, ACGIH (1992) TWA-TLV 0.05 ppm	3			
Silicon tetrachloride	SiCl_{4}	10026-04-7		OSHA PEL, NIOSH REL 5 ppm; ACGIH TLV 2 ppm	3	~~W~~	8000 (Rat, 4 h)	1 - 5
Silicon tetrafluoride	SiF_{4}	7783-61-1			3	~~W~~	922 (Rat, 1 h)	
Stibine	H_{3}Sb	7803-52-3	5	OSHA PEL/NIOSH REL/ACGIH TLV: 0.1 ppm	4			
Disulfur decafluoride	S_{2}F_{10}	5714-22-7	1	ACGIH (1962) ceiling limit 0.01 ppm	4	OX	2 (Rat, 10 min)	
Sulfur tetrafluoride	SF_{4}	7783-60-0		OSHA PEL/NIOSH REL/ACGIH (1992) ceiling limit 0.1 ppm	3	~~W~~	40 (Rat, 1 h)	
Tellurium hexafluoride	TeF_{6}	7783-80-4	1	NIOSH REL/ACGIH (1992) TWA-TLV 0.02 ppm				
Tetraethyl pyrophosphate	C_{8}H_{20}O_{7}P_{2}	107-49-3	5	ACGIH (2006) TWA-TLV 0.01 mg/m^{3}	4			
Sulfotep	C_{8}H_{20}O_{5}P_{2}S_{2}	3689-24-5	10	NIOSH PEL TWA 0.2 ppm	4		38 (Rat, 4 h)	
Trifluoroacetyl chloride	C_{2}ClF_{3}O	354-32-5						
Tungsten hexafluoride	WF_{6}	7783-82-6		OSHA PEL TWA 2.5 ppm; ACGIH TLV TWA 3 ppm	3	~~W~~	218 (Rat, 1 h)	

== See also ==
- List of Schedule 1 substances (CWC)
- EPA list of extremely hazardous substances
- Chemical warfare
- Chemical weapon
- List of chemical warfare agents
- List of psychoactive drugs used by militaries
- Psychochemical warfare
- List of gases
- Toxicity class
- Toxicity label
