= MEFO =

Company involved in financing Nazi German rearmament

MEFO (Metallurgische Forschungsgesellschaft m.b.H., lit. 'Society for Metallurgical Research LLC') was a dummy company set up by the Nazi German government to finance the German re-armament effort in the years prior to World War II.

== Origins ==
This dummy company was set up in May 1933, just after appointment of Hjalmar Schacht as Reichsbank President in March 1933, as a front for purchases from four German armament manufacturers, Krupp, Siemens, Gutehoffnungshütte, and Rheinmetall. The four were persuaded to put up the initial share capital of 250,000 Reichsmarks. The German government was not openly involved; formally, MEFO was a private company, but in practice it was controlled through two directors, one appointed by the Reich Ministry of Defence and the other by the Reichsbank.

The four companies pooled together over 1 billion Reichsmark (equivalent to 2.6 billion euros in 2021) where the National Socialist government agreed to repay the money with five-year promissory notes known as Mefo bills. Soon afterwards, the Nazis discounted these notes (known in German as Mefo-Wechsel), basically turning them into a type of currency.

Between 1934 and 1938, Mefo bills worth a total of 12 billion Reichsmark were issued to pay for rearmament. To put that into context, Germany's national debt in 1932, the year before Hitler took power, was only 10 billion Reichsmark. By 1938 the official admitted national debt was 19 billion Reichsmark – but the Reichsmark 12 billion in Mefo bills has to be added on top of that. In other words, Hitler and the German Minister of Economics, Hjalmar Schacht, tripled Germany's national debt in just six years, but more than half of the increase was off the books.

When the MEFO notes fell due in 1938, the government discovered a serious cash shortage. To resolve the problem, the Nazi regime employed "highly dubious methods" where "banks were forced to buy government bonds to be used to repay these bills, and the government took money from savings accounts and insurance companies. This made the ordinary German citizen the financier of the German rearmament." Eventually, the government had to resort to the printing press to help mitigate the cash shortage.

It was one of the key components of Germany's rearmament program and was invented by Hjalmar Schacht, who then was head of the Ministry of Economics, and Plenipotentiary for the War Economy.

After assuming power in 1933, the National Socialists realized that rearming Germany would require funds that were not likely to be generated from taxes or public loans. In addition, the need to keep the rearmament effort secret led to the creation of this dummy company.

== Transactions ==
The transactions that led to the re-armament financing were conducted as follows:

- Armaments manufacturers were contracted to produce arms.
- Mefo bills of exchange were drawn by these contractors as payment for their invoice from the German Reich, and accepted by MEFO Company.
- The bills of exchange were received by all German banks for possible re-discounting with the Reichsbank.
- The bills of exchange were guaranteed by the German Reich for five years after issue.

This system continued to be used until April 1938, when almost 12 billion Reichsmark (equivalent to 27.6 billion euros in 2021) of such bills were outstanding. At that time the first of these bills, which were guaranteed for five years, would come due in 1939 when the holders would likely present them to the Reichsbank for payment.

This method of financing enabled the Nazi government to obtain large loans from the Reichsbank which was prohibited under then existing statutes. Direct lending to the Government by the Reichsbank had been limited by statute to 100 million Reichsmark.

The large nature of these outstandings led eventually to a bureaucratic confrontation between the Reichsbank and the Finance Ministry in 1939, leading to the resignation of Hjalmar Schacht, the author of the whole strategy on 20 January 1939.

== See also ==
- German rearmament

== Quotes ==
- "Our armaments are also financed partly with the credits of our political opponents." – Hjalmar Schacht in a memorandum to Adolf Hitler dated 3 May 1935.
