= Bis(trifluoromethyl)peroxide =

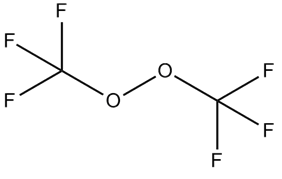

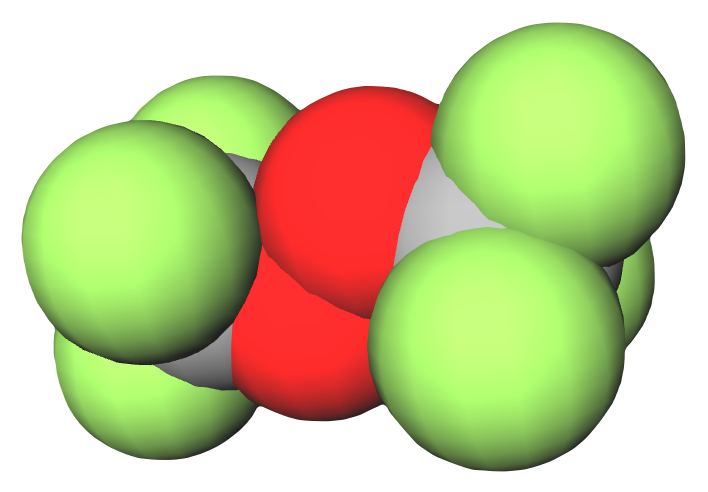
- Structure formula for BTP.

Names
- Preferred IUPAC name Trifluoro[(trifluoromethyl)peroxy]methane
- Other names Di(trifluoromethyl)peroxide

Identifiers
CAS Number	927-84-4
3D model (JSmol)	Interactive image
ChemSpider	63413
PubChem CID	70228
UNII	V4RC2IQ0V7
CompTox Dashboard (EPA)	DTXSID5073242
- InChI: InChI=InChi=1S/C2F6O2/c3-1(4,5)9-10-2(6,7)8
- SMILES: C(F)(F)(F)OOC(F)(F)F

Properties
Chemical formula	CF_{3}OOCF_{3}
Molar mass	170.010 g·mol^{−1}
Appearance	Colorless gas
Density	1.588 g/cm^{3}
Boiling point	−37 °C (−35 °F; 236 K)
log P	2.65
Vapor pressure	5180 mmHg
Refractive index (n_{D})	1.231
- Except where otherwise noted, data are given for materials in their standard state (at 25 °C [77 °F], 100 kPa). Infobox references

Bis(trifluoromethyl)peroxide (BTP) is a fluorocarbon compound with formula CF_{3}OOCF_{3}. It is a colorless toxic gas. This compound was first produced by Frédéric Swarts. It has some utility as a radical initiator for polymerisation reactions. BTP is unusual in the fact that, unlike many peroxides, it is a gas, is non-explosive, and has good thermal stability.

== History ==
BTP was first synthesised by an electrolysis reaction using aqueous solutions containing trifluoroacetate ion but only in trace amounts. BTP was one of the by-products formed during trifluoromethylation reactions carried out by Swarts. Later it was discovered that BTP had some unusual properties and so more economically viable synthesis routes were sought. An early example was that of Porter and Cady, who were able to achieve a conversion rate of around 20-30% at atmospheric pressure and up to 90% at elevated pressure in an autoclave.

== Synthesis and reaction ==
Present methods of the synthesis of BTP involves the reaction of carbonyl fluoride and chlorine trifluoride at 0-300 °C. An example of this reaction is the reaction of carbonyl fluoride and chlorine trifluoride in the presence of alkali metal fluorides or bifluorides at 100-250 °C. This example is quite insensitive to variations in temperature. Examples of the synthesis are:

2 COF_{2} + ClF_{3} → CF_{3}OOCF_{3} + ClF
6 COF_{2} + 2 ClF_{3} → 3 CF_{3}OOCF_{3} + Cl_{2}

BTP can be isolated and purified by well-recognised procedures. In the mixture used to synthesize the compound chlorine monofluoride and chlorine trifluoride may still be present. These compounds are highly reactive and hazardous and are preferably deactivated as soon as possible. The deactivation is carried out by adding anhydrous calcium chloride to the mixture. The deactivated mixture is scrubbed with water and diluted caustically to remove the chlorine and residual carbonyl before drying to yield pure BTP.

== Metabolism ==
In mammals, there are pathways for the metabolism of peroxides using various enzymes of the peroxidase class. For BTP, this would correspond to the following general reaction scheme:

Peroxidase + CF_{3}OOCF_{3} → 2 CF_{3}O^{−}

The peroxidase will then undergo two sequential electron transfers to return to its original state.

=== Hepatoxicity ===
Simulation of the toxicity of BTP has shown that organic peroxides can cause peripheral and centrilobular zonal hepatic necrosis, increased liver weight and hepatic enzymes and fatty changes in hepatocytes. This occurs in both humans and experimental animals. The toxicity of peroxides is thought to be caused by the formation of reactive oxygen species (ROS) which are involved in lipid peroxidation further oxidative cellular damage.

Organic peroxides are often industrially used as oxidising agents. Exposure to such agents, for instance in the reported case of humans that were exposed to methyl ethyl ketone peroxide (MEKP), has been shown to cause peripheral zonal necrosis, increased hepatic enzyme levels and atypical pseudo-ductular proliferation at doses between 50 and 100 mL.

Past animal studies have shown good correlations between organic peroxide damage in human case reports and test animals. 28-day repeat- dose studies of 1,1-bis(tert-butyldioxy)-3,3,5-trimethylcyclohexane and dicumyl peroxide in rats showed liver weight increase, periportal fatty changes and centrilobular hypertrophy of hepatocytes.

A proposed mechanism for the toxicity of organic peroxides involves damage via formation of ROS, which is mediated by cytochrome P450. This then leads to lipid peroxidation of the membranes of the hepatocytes, alkylation of cellular macromolecules (reduced glutathione, altered calcium homeostasis. Identification of carboxyl, peroxyl, hydroxyl and alkoxyl radicals in rest rats give plausibility to the involvement of an oxidative system. Oral rat repeat dose studies with organic peroxides over 28 days have also shown alterations in rat kidneys in the form of histopathologic lesions.

== See also ==
- List of highly toxic gases
- Bis(trifluoromethyl) disulfide
