= Fontainebleau Memorandum =

Memorandum by David Lloyd George

The Fontainebleau Memorandum is the name given to a document written by British Prime Minister David Lloyd George and his advisers during the 1919 Paris Peace Conference that was drafting the Treaty of Versailles. It was titled ‘Some Considerations for the Peace Conference Before They Finally Draft Their Terms, March 25th, 1919’.

Lloyd George and the President of the United States, Woodrow Wilson, were opposed to the French demand for Allied occupation of the Rhineland except as a temporary measure to be used as a guarantee for German payment of reparations. Lloyd George therefore decided to set down in writing the limits to which the British delegation at the Conference were prepared to go. Lloyd George, General Smuts, Sir Henry Wilson, Sir Maurice Hankey and Philip Kerr retired to Fontainebleau to decide what kind of peace treaty they would like to see.

The memorandum called for a peace based on justice that would not provoke future wars. It also warned of the danger of provoking Germany into becoming Bolshevik and it endorsed the creation of a League of Nations to ensure international right and the abolition of competitive armaments.

== See also ==
- German disarmament
