= Mefo bill =

Financial instrument used to finance Nazi German rearmament

A Mefo bill (sometimes written as MEFO bill; German: Mefo-Wechsel) was a six-month promissory note, drawn upon the dummy company Metallurgische Forschungsgesellschaft ('Metallurgical Research Corporation'), devised by the German Central Bank President, Hjalmar Schacht, in 1934. These bills could be discounted by any German bank at any time, and these banks, in turn, could rediscount the bills at the Reichsbank at any time within the last three months of their earliest maturity. They therefore acted as a highly liquid means of payment to finance the Nazi German government's programme of rearmament, allowing them to rearm under the Treaty of Versailles.

Mefo bills followed the scheme for which the Öffa bills were the blueprint.

As Germany was rearming against the terms of the Treaty of Versailles, the Nazi government needed a form of financing that did not leave a paper trail and allowed them to spend past the treaty terms on military rearmament. Importantly, Adolf Hitler had recently come to power, and he demanded of Schacht that any solution had to avoid inflation. It is assumed that billions of Mefo bills were issued throughout the regime's time in power, though the records are not precise.

== Funding rearmament ==
The German government needed to spend a large amount of money to fund the Depression-era reconstruction of its heavy industry based economy and, ultimately, its re-armament industry. However, it faced two problems. First, rearmament was illegal under the terms of the Treaty of Versailles, and secondly there was a legal interest-rate limit of 4.5%.

The government would normally borrow extra funds on the money market by offering a higher interest rate. However, because of the limit it was unable to do so. Additionally, a large, visible government deficit would have attracted attention. Mefo bills could be traded between companies, allowing for increased circulation of currency.

== An imaginary company ==
Hjalmar Schacht formed the limited liability company Metallurgische Forschungsgesellschaft m.b.H., or "Mefo" for short. The company's "Mefo bills" served as bills of exchange, convertible into Reichsmark (ℛ︁ℳ︁) upon request. "Mefo" had no product, service or operation. It was solely a balance sheet entity.

Mefo bills were issued to mature in six months, but with a provision for indefinite 90-day extensions at the government's behest. To further entice investors, Mefo bills carried an annual interest rate of 4%, higher than that of other trade bills at the time.

To make sure that the bills were never exchanged for Reichsmarks, which would lead to inflation, the 90-day maturation period was continually extended until the maturation was changed to a period of five years by 1939. The exact total volume of Mefo bills issued was kept secret. However, as previously stated, it is assumed billions were printed.

Essentially, Mefo bills enabled the German Reich to run a greater deficit than it would otherwise have been able to. By 1938, there were 12 billion ℛ︁ℳ︁, equivalent to €53.6 billion in 2021, of Mefo bills, compared with 19 billion ℛ︁ℳ︁, equivalent to €84.9 billion in 2021, of standard government bonds. This enabled the German government to increase war production while delaying the economic problems associated with draining government funds.

== Economic effects ==
The Nazi government's continued use of debt funding created a large financial deficit. However, Mefo bills were very effective in providing funds. Previous to the Mefo program, the Reichsbank was not allowed to loan more than 100 million ℛ︁ℳ︁ to the government. Mefo bills allowed billions in military and public-works funding. Germany, through Mefo bills, began printing money. However, inflation did not increase. This is because the Nazi government rarely redeemed Mefo bills. In addition, the interest rate and supposed security of the Mefo bills meant most were kept in circulation and rarely cashed, which essentially prevented any potential negative consequences of the Mefo bills from occurring such as inflation.

== Sources ==
- Kopper, Christopher (April 1998). "Banking in National Socialist Germany, 1933–39". Financial History Review. 5 (1). doi:10.1017/S0968565000001414.
- "Nazi Conspiracy and Aggression". Lillian Goldman Law Library. Chapter XVI, part 12.
- Overy, R. J. (1996). The Nazi economic recovery, 1932-1938. New studies in economic and social history. Economic History Society (2nd ed.). New York: Cambridge University Press. ISBN 978-0-521-55767-2.
- Peterson, Edward Norman (1954). Hjalmar Schacht For and Against Hitler. The Christopher Publishing House.
- Shirer, William Lawrence (1960). The Rise and Fall of the Third Reich: A History of Nazi Germany. New York City: Simon & Schuster. ASIN B0766DKDLR. LCCN 60006729. OCLC 1286630. OL 5794925M. Wikidata Q138029595.
- Tooze, J. Adam (2007). The wages of destruction: the making and breaking of the Nazi economy (1st ed.). New York: Viking. ISBN 978-0-670-03826-8. OCLC 71266549.
