= Trifluoroacetyl chloride =

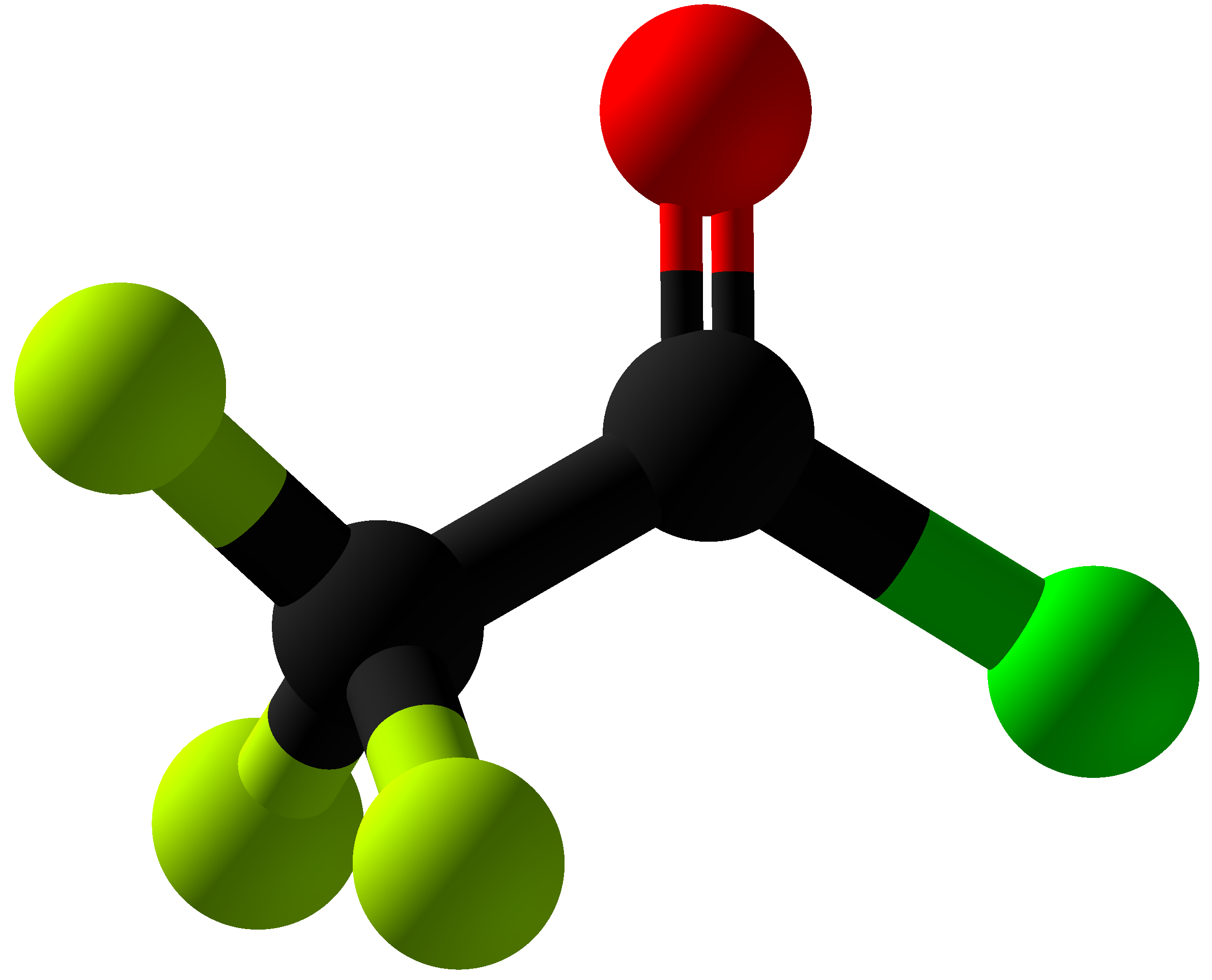

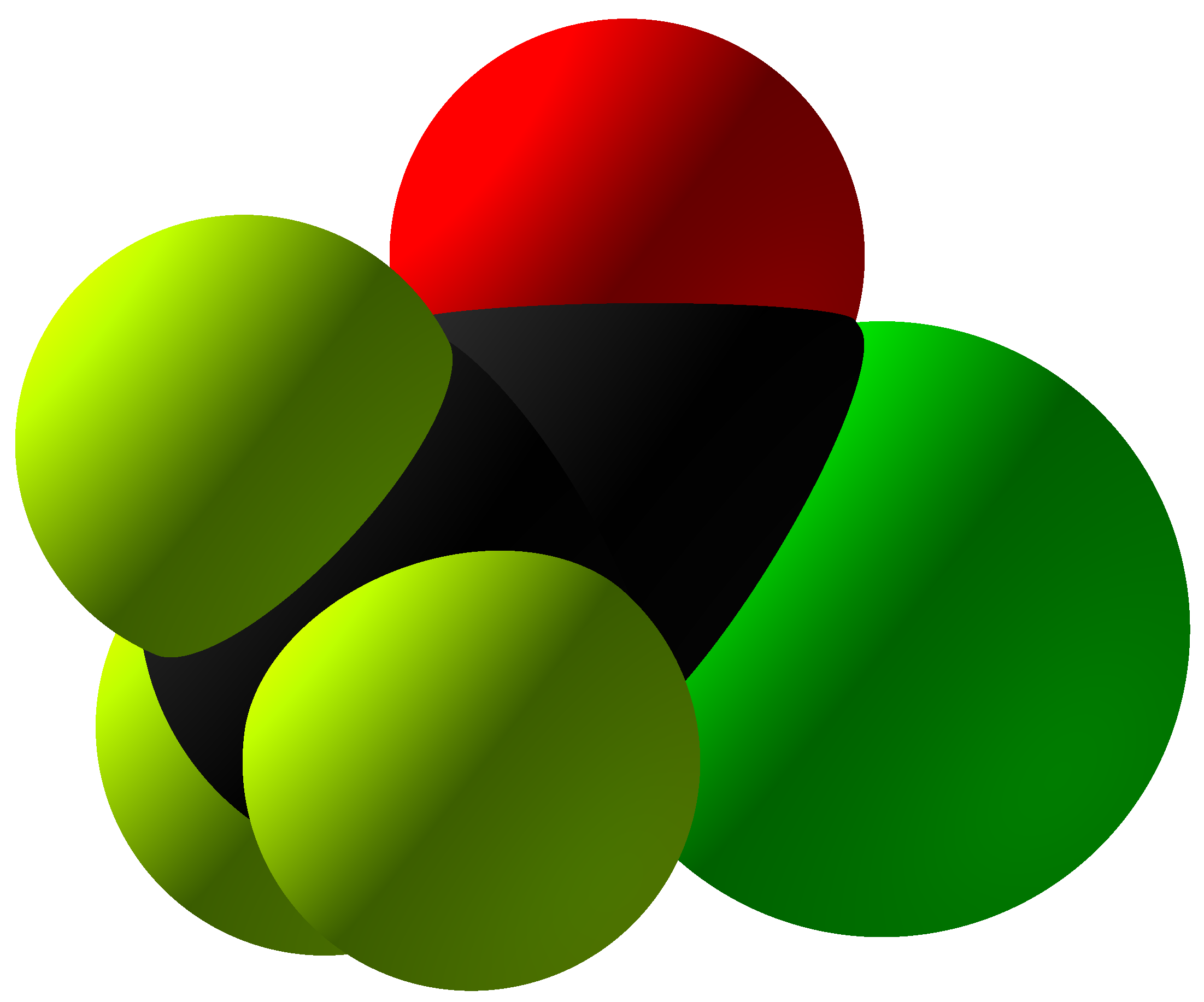

Names
- Preferred IUPAC name Trifluoroacetyl chloride
- Other names 2,2,2-Trifluoroacetyl chloride

Identifiers
| CAS Number | 354-32-5 |
| 3D model (JSmol) | Interactive image |
| Beilstein Reference | 1098994 |
| ChEBI | CHEBI:29138 |
| ChemSpider | 13870615 |
| ECHA InfoCard | 100.005.961 |
| EC Number | 206-556-2 |
| PubChem CID | 61106 |
| UNII | A23U71SY9G |
| UN number | 3057 |
| CompTox Dashboard (EPA) | DTXSID701336249 DTXSID1029176, DTXSID701336249 |
- InChI: InChI=1S/C2ClF3O/c3-1(7)2(4,5)6 Key: PNQBEPDZQUOCNY-UHFFFAOYSA-N; InChI=1/C2ClF3O/c3-1(7)2(4,5)6 Key: PNQBEPDZQUOCNY-UHFFFAOYAG
- SMILES: C(=O)(C(F)(F)F)Cl

Properties
| Chemical formula | C_{2}ClF_{3}O |
| Molar mass | 132.469 |
| Melting point | −146 °C (−231 °F; 127 K) |
| Boiling point | −27 °C (−17 °F; 246 K) |

Hazards
- GHS labelling
| Pictograms | (GHS05: Corrosive) (GHS06: Toxic) (GHS07: Exclamation mark) |
| Signal word | Danger |
| Hazard statements | H312, H314, H330, H335, H412 |
| Precautionary statements | P260, P264, P271, P273, P280, P284, P301+P330+P331, P302+P352, P303+P361+P353, P304+P340, P305+P351+P338, P310, P312, P320, P321, P363, P403+P233, P405, P501 |
- Except where otherwise noted, data are given for materials in their standard state (at 25 °C [77 °F], 100 kPa). Infobox references

Trifluoroacetyl chloride (also known as TFAC) is a toxic gaseous chemical compound with the chemical formula C_{2}ClF_{3}O. TFAC is the perfluorinated version of acetyl chloride. The compound is a gas, but it is usually shipped as a liquid under high pressure.

== Properties ==
Trifluoroacetyl chloride has a vapor density that is 4.6 times that of air, or about 1.384 grams per milliliter at 20 °C (68 °F) as a liquid under pressure. The compound has a melting point of −146 °C (−231 °F) and a boiling point of −27 °C (−17 °F). The compound easily reacts with water and moist air to produce the toxic gas hydrogen chloride and trifluoroacetic acid.

Trifluoroacetyl chloride is incompatible with a number of other varieties of chemicals, such as amines, alcohols, alkalis, and strong oxidizers. It reacts strongly with amines and alkalis. It also reacts violently with diisopropyl ether, or any ether if metal salts are present, sometimes causing an explosion.

Trifluoroacetyl chloride's heat of vaporization is 20 kilojoules per mole at 65 btus per pound.

Numerous atoms and compounds can replace the chlorine atom in trifluoroacetyl chloride. These include iodine, fluorine, cyanide, thiocyanate, and isocyanate. The compound also reacts easily with metal alkyls. This reaction has the form of CF_{3}COCl + MR → CF_{3}COR + MCl, where M can be lithium, copper, magnesium, mercury, silver, or cadmium. When trifluoroacetyl chloride also reacts with ketene and esterification yields occur, the resulting reaction forms trifluoroacetoacetate esters.

Trifluoroacetyl chloride also reacts with soil, cellulose-based absorbents, and clay-based absorbents. When the compound reacts with water in contact with metal, hydrogen gas, which is explosive, is produced. The compound forms a clustering reaction with a methyl group (CH_{3}).

== Production ==
Trifluoroacetyl chloride can be produced by catalytic chlorination of chlorine and trifluoroacetaldehyde. The compound can also be produced if halothane is oxidized using CYP2E1. This is also done with CYP2A6 instead of CPY2E1, but less readily.

== Applications and storage ==
Trifluoroacetyl chloride's applications include uses in medicine, pesticides, the fine chemical industry, and the organic intermediate industry. However, the compound itself is not sold to consumers or as a commodity. Some acetoacetic esters produced by trifluoroacetyl chloride are in turn used to perform chemical reactions that result in the formation of compounds with agricultural and pharmaceutical applications.

One of trifluoroacetyl chloride's uses is in adding trifluoromethyl to complex molecules during chemical reactions.

In the late 1970s, trifluoroacetyl chloride was explored for use as a reagent for nuclear magnetic resonance. It was intended to be used on amines, alcohols, thiols, and phenols.

Trifluoroacetyl chloride is typically stored as a liquid under high pressure.

== Biological role, precautions, and toxicity ==
Liquid trifluoroacetyl chloride can cause frostbite if it comes in contact with unprotected skin. If inhaled, the compound in its gaseous state will irritate the eyes, skin, and mucous membranes. Trifluoroacetyl chloride is a toxic compound, and may be fatal if inhaled, ingested or absorbed through the skin. When the compound burns, it produces toxic gases. It also corrodes the respiratory tract. The compound is also a lacrimator. It can cause dyspnea if inhaled by mice, rats, or guinea pigs. A concentration of 35.3 parts per million of trifluoroacetyl chloride is enough to usually kill a rat in six hours.

Trifluoroacetyl chloride does not bioaccumulate significantly. However, it is harmful to aquatic organisms.

Trifluoroacetyl chloride is metabolized by Cytochrome P450 enzymes. The immune systems of organisms typically react to this.

== See also ==
- List of highly toxic gases
- Halocarbon
