= Federal Central Tax Office =

German federal agency

- Bundeszentralamt für Steuern (BZSt)
- Emblem of the Federal Central Tax Office

Agency overview
- Formed: 1 January 2006; 20 years ago
- Jurisdiction: Government of Germany
- Headquarters: Bonn; 50.74537°N 7.12516°E
- Employees: 2,400 (2021)
- Agency executive: Maren Kohlrust-Schulz, President
- Parent agency: Federal Ministry of Finance
- Website: Official website

The Federal Central Tax Office (Bundeszentralamt für Steuern, abbreviated BZSt) is a German federal agency responsible for administering sections of the national tax code. It was established on 1 January 2006 as part of the Federal Ministry of Finance and employs around 2,400 staff (as of 2021).

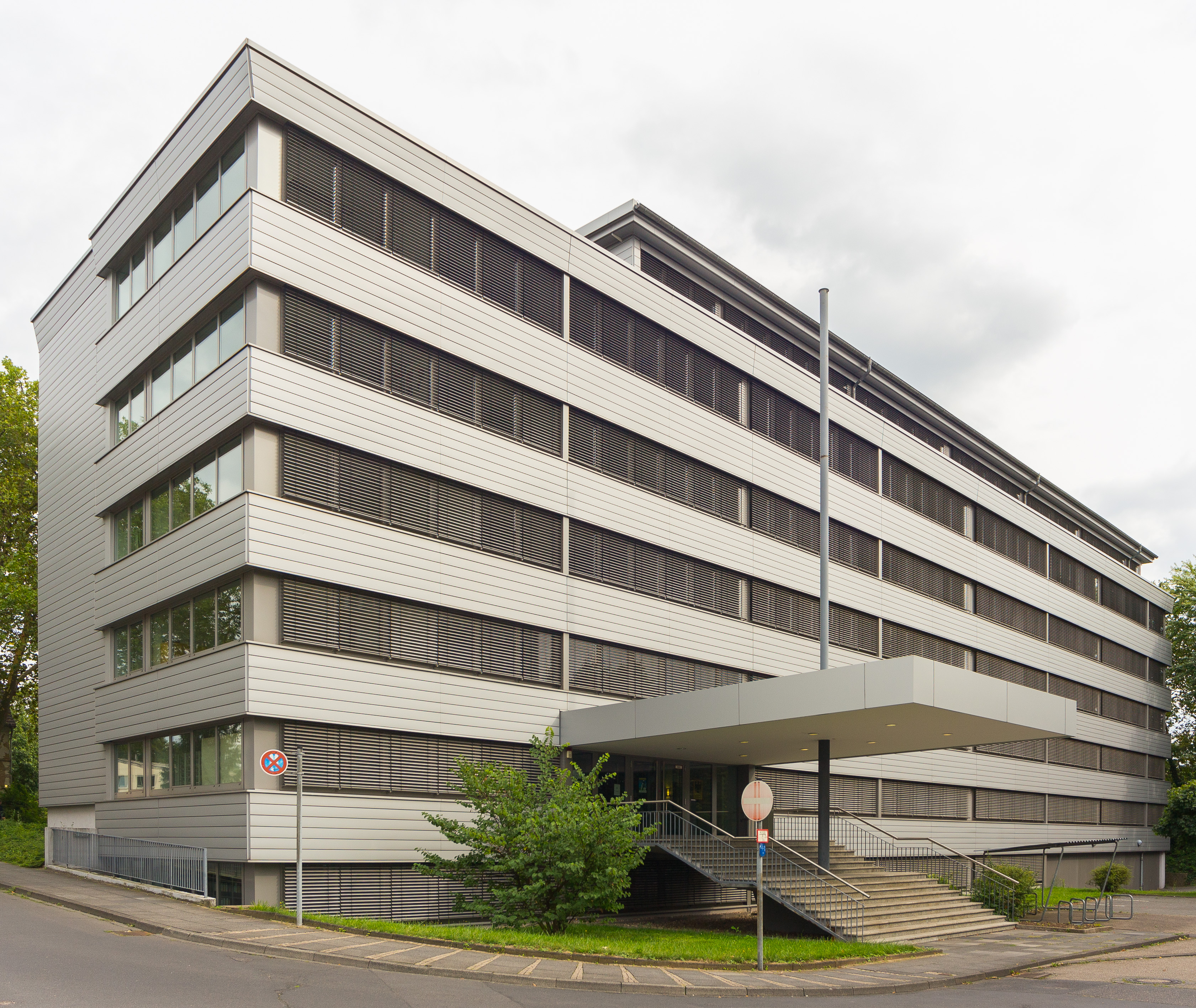
BZSt offices in Bonn-Beuel

Since July 2007, the BZSt has issued a unique national identification number to every resident, replacing the formerly decentralized system. It also operates databases for local tax offices.

== Departments ==
- Department Q (Querschnittsaufgaben, cross-sectional services): legal affairs, compliance, HR, internal services, IT, reporting, risk management, automation, and legal documentation
- Department I (Umsatzsteuer, VAT): VAT refunds, auditing, civil penalties, VAT ID issuance, and EU VAT reporting
- Department II (National taxes): insurance and fire brigade taxes, child benefits, private pensions (Riester and Rürup), capital gains exemptions, bank auditing, and certification of pension plans
- Department III (Foreign withholding taxes): treaty procedures, assistance with direct taxes, services for foreign investors, capital gains relief, and tax processing for foreign artists and athletes
- Federal Tax Auditing Departments I–III: employ about 500 auditors overseeing approximately 15,000 corporations

== Offices ==
The BZSt has its main offices in Bonn (district of Beuel) at An der Küppe 1 and Platanenweg 33. Additional offices are located in Berlin, Saarlouis, and Schwedt/Oder.
