= Oeffa bills =

1932 German government promissory notes

Oeffa bills (German: Öffa-Wechsel) or job-creation bills were promissory notes created in 1932 by the Weimar Republic during the height of the great depression in an attempt to mitigate and or reverse the economic damage. The Oeffa bills were aimed at additional fund-raising for public building initiatives and later for job-creation schemes.

Oeffa bills were the blueprint for the Mefo bills which followed the same scheme, although Mefo bills were focused on the secret rearmament of Nazi Germany.

== History ==
In May 1932, Oeffa bills were created by the second cabinet of Chancellor Heinrich Brüning after consultation with the president of the Reichsbank, Hans Luther. The bills were issued by the Deutsche Gesellschaft für öffentliche Arbeiten AG (German Society for Public Works, Inc.), founded 1 August 1930 and rediscounted by the Reichsbank. With the capital thus raised, the Deutsche Gesellschaft für öffentliche Arbeiten AG financed public building initiatives. It was a shell company without sufficient shareholders' equity. Nevertheless, the bills were discounted by the Reichsbank. This way, the Reichsbank financed public building projects.

In the wake of the Great Depression, this hidden money creation was intended to stimulate the German economy. The Deutsche Gesellschaft für öffentliche Arbeiten AG brought into circulation Oeffa bills worth 1.26 billion Reichsmark. In general, the duration of a bill was three months but it could be prolonged to five years.

Economically, this meant an expansion of the money supply. As this would tend towards increasing inflation, Hans Luther agreed to only a small volume.

Chancellor Kurt von Schleicher's cabinet decided to expand the Oeffa bill scheme. Oeffa bills could be issued by other (mostly public) financial institutions such as the Deutsche Verkehrskreditbank AG, which issued Oeffa bills worth 1 billion Reichsmark. After becoming chancellor in January 1933, Adolf Hitler wanted to extend the scheme to German re-armament, but Luther disagreed, and he was replaced on 16 March 1933 by Hjalmar Schacht. Schacht instituted the Mefo bills, a similar system to the Oeffa bills.

== See also ==
- Mefo bills
