= Diethyl phosphorochloridate =

Names
- Preferred IUPAC name Diethyl phosphorochloridate
- Other names: Diethylchlorophosphate; Diethoxyphosphorus oxychloride; Diethyl chlorophosphate; Diethyl chlorophosphonate; Diethyl phosphorochloride; Diethoxyphosphoryl chloride; O,O-Diethyl chlorophosphate

Identifiers
CAS Number	814-49-3
3D model (JSmol)	Interactive image
ChemSpider	12587
ECHA InfoCard	100.011.270
PubChem CID	13139
UNII	F1NZC04LRU
CompTox Dashboard (EPA)	DTXSID4052556
- InChI: InChI=1S/C4H10ClO3P/c1-3-7-9(5,6)8-4-2/h3-4H2,1-2H3 Key: LGTLXDJOAJDFLR-UHFFFAOYSA-N; InChI=1/C4H10ClO3P/c1-3-7-9(5,6)8-4-2/h3-4H2,1-2H3 Key: LGTLXDJOAJDFLR-UHFFFAOYAA
- SMILES: CCOP(=O)(OCC)Cl

Properties
Chemical formula	(C_{2}H_{5}O)_{2}P(O)Cl
Molar mass	172.54 g·mol^{−1}
Appearance	colorless liquid
Density	1.1915 g/cm^{3}
Boiling point	60 °C (140 °F; 333 K) (2 mm Hg)
- Except where otherwise noted, data are given for materials in their standard state (at 25 °C [77 °F], 100 kPa). Infobox references

Diethyl chlorophosphate is an organophosphorus compound with the formula (C_{2}H_{5}O)_{2}P(O)Cl. As a reagent in organic synthesis, it is used to convert alcohols to the corresponding diethylphosphate esters. It is a colorless liquid with a pleasant fruity (apple-like) odor. It is a corrosive, and, as a cholinesterase inhibitor, it is highly toxic through dermal absorption. The molecule is tetrahedral.

== Synthesis and reactions ==
The compound is prepared by the chlorination of diethylphosphite with carbon tetrachloride (Atherton–Todd reaction).

The compound is electrophilic. Controlled hydrolysis gives tetraethyl pyrophosphate. Alcohols react to give phosphate esters:

(C_{2}H_{5}O)_{2}P(O)Cl + ROH → (C_{2}H_{5}O)_{2}P(O)OR + HCl

The reagent is routinely employed in organic synthesis for phosphorylation of carboxylates, alcohols, and amines.

== See also ==
- Diethyl chlorophosphate at www.chemicalbook.com.
