= Philippe de Clermont =

French chemist

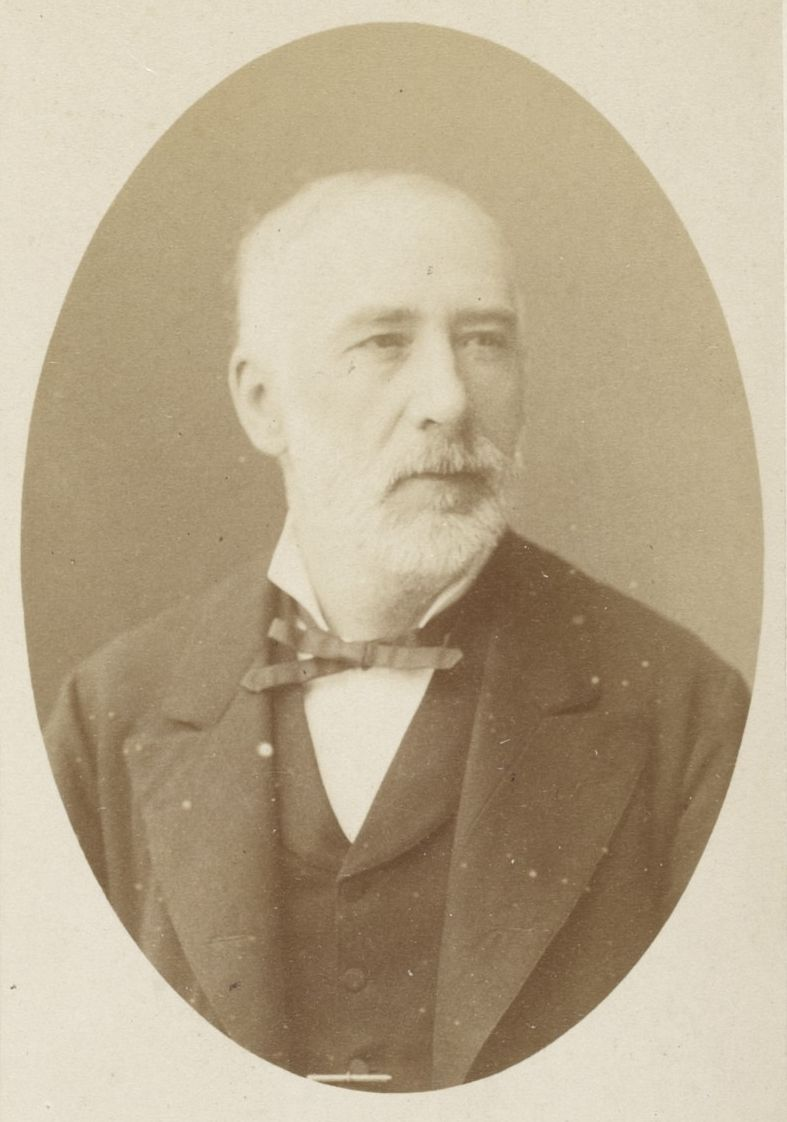
- Philippe de Clermont
- Born: 1831
- Died: 1921 (aged 89–90)
- Known for: In 1854 Philip de Clermount described the synthesis of tetraethyl pyrophosphate at a meeting of the French Academy of Sciences.
- Scientific career
- Fields: chemistry
- Thesis: Recherches sur les composés octytiques (1870)

Philippe de Clermont (1831–1921) was a French organic chemist. He was known for the synthesis of the first organophosphate cholinesterase inhibitor (tetraethyl pyrophosphate, TEPP). He worked in Adolphe Wurtz's laboratory in Paris.

== Published works ==
- Recherches sur les composés octyliques (1870).
- Application du sulfure de manganèse comme conleur plastique (1890).
