= Dummy corporation =

Entity created as a front or cover

A dummy corporation, dummy company, or false company is an entity created to serve as a front or cover for one or more companies. It can have the appearance of being real (logo, website, and sometimes employing actual staff), but lacks the capacity to function independently. The dummy corporation's sole purpose is to protect "an individual or another corporation from liability in either contract or import".

Typically, dummy companies are established in an international location—usually by the creator's "attorney or bagman"—to conceal the true owner of the often-illegitimate and empty company.

== Corporate use ==
=== Blackwater Worldwide ===
The multinational security corporation Blackwater Worldwide was reported to have obtained over thirty dummy corporations to secure million dollar contracts from the United States government. After the backlash from Blackwater's "reckless misconduct" in Iraq, the security corporation successfully obtained lucrative American contracts under several subsidiaries.

=== Compass East Corporation ===
Walt Disney World was made possible by the acquisition of land through several entities.

Walt Disney World Company's use of Compass East Corporation, created in Delaware in 1964, is an example of a dummy corporation established to purchase land. On September 30, 1966, Latin-American Development and Management Corporation; Ayefour Corporation (a pun on Interstate 4); Tomahawk Properties, Incorporated; Reedy Creek Ranch, Incorporated; and Bay Lake Properties, Incorporated; all Florida corporations, were merged into Compass East Corporation. These corporations collectively purchased large masses of land in Central Florida that eventually became the Walt Disney World Resort. The dummy corporations were established to prevent "unknowing landowners" from increasing prices of the land by disguising the true plans and owner of the purchased acres. Disney was also criticised for persuading the Florida government to waive municipal jurisdiction over the acquired land, allowing Disney to create anything on the land with little legal restriction. Today, that entity is known as the Reedy Creek Improvement District (RCID).

=== Glencairn, Ltd ===
Glencairn, Ltd was an American company used by the Sinclair Broadcast Group to operate virtual duopolies during the 1990s when legal duopolies were not allowed by the Federal Communications Commission. The initial capital was supplied by Carolyn Smith, wife of Sinclair founder Julian Smith and mother of current Sinclair CEO David Smith. Carolyn Smith also controlled 70% of Glencairn's stock, eventually reaching 97%.

In 1999, the FCC relaxed its ownership rules and allowed one company to own two stations in the same market starting in 2001. This development brought the Sinclair-Glencairn arrangement to light for the first time. At the time, Glencairn was getting ready to buy Sullivan-owned KOKH-TV (channel 25) in Oklahoma City, Oklahoma, where Sinclair already owned KOCB (channel 34). When the FCC relaxed its rules, Sinclair simply replaced Glencairn as the buyer for KOKH. Glencairn then announced plans to sell five of its stations to Sinclair outright. It later emerged that Glencairn was to be paid for the proposed purchases with Sinclair stock, and that the Smiths controlled almost all of Glencairn's stock. Eventually, the FCC placed a $40,000 fine against Sinclair for illegally controlling Glencairn.

Glencairn was eventually renamed under its current name Cunningham Broadcasting in 2001, with Sinclair later launching similar sidecars with Deerfield Media and Howard Stirk Holdings once Sinclair began rapid expansion in 2011; the latter two companies are used where both Sinclair and Cunningham already own stations such as Baltimore.

=== Japan Asia Airways (JAA) ===
The now-defunct Japan Asia Airways (JAA) was created in 1975 as a fully owned subsidiary company owned by Japan Airlines (JAL) designed to specifically fly the Japan-Taiwan route. As the Chinese government threatened to eliminate Japan Airlines Co., Ltd.'s (JAL) airport traffic rights coming to and from China, JAA was a solution to help decompress the politically sensitive issue. Several other airlines used similarly named subsidiaries to fly into Taiwan without the parent company losing their rights to fly to China; such as British Airways (British Asia Airways), Air France and Air France Cargo (Air France Asie and Air France Cargo Asie respectively) and Qantas (Australia Asia Airlines).

=== Packet Monster, Inc. ===
Packet Monster, Inc. was a Singaporean company in charge of running the popular Japanese forum, 2channel, but was discovered to be a dummy corporation "existing only in name". The forum is infamous for sexually explicit content, slander, extreme nationalism, and allegedly "facilitating drug deals". While the company was registered in an office building in central Singapore, the Singaporean Metropolitan Police Department discovered that Rikvin Pte Ltd. was the true firm working in the rented space. An employee of the firm admitted to conducting corporate secretarial work for Packet Monster, Inc., in combination of 2,000 other "companies" across the globe.

=== Union Pacific Railroad ===
In 1867, the Union Pacific Railroad set up a dummy company known as Crédit Mobilier. Union Pacific told the federal government that Crédit Mobilier will be the company constructing the eastern portion of the First transcontinental railroad. The federal government gave Crédit Mobilier around $150 million to build the railway. Upon receiving the subsidies, Union Pacific took most of the money and bought their own stock. These stocks were subsequently used to bribe politicians, including the Vice President of the United States.

== Government use ==
To conceal secret missions and operations, governments may create dummy corporations.

=== Air America ===
Air America was an American passenger and cargo airline covertly owned and operated by the Central Intelligence Agency (CIA) from 1950 to 1976. It was used to secretly carry out American military operations in areas that would result in the United States violating treaty restraints as defined in the 1954 and 1962 Geneva Accords. Air America was most significant for its position in "supplying and supporting covert operations in Southeast Asia during the Vietnam War", and was allegedly reported to have participated in transporting opiates on behalf of Hmong leader Vang Pao during the CIA's secret war in Laos.

=== Air Asia ===
Air Asia was a CIA proprietary headquartered in Taipei that once ran the "largest airplane maintenance facility in Southeast Asia" during the Vietnam War. Although the CIA sold the subsidiary in February 1975, it once served all of the United States Air Force serviced in East Asia, and carried out covert aircraft operations centred in the Pacific. As of 1994, Air Asia is owned by the Taiwan Aerospace Corporation (TAC).

=== Other CIA use ===
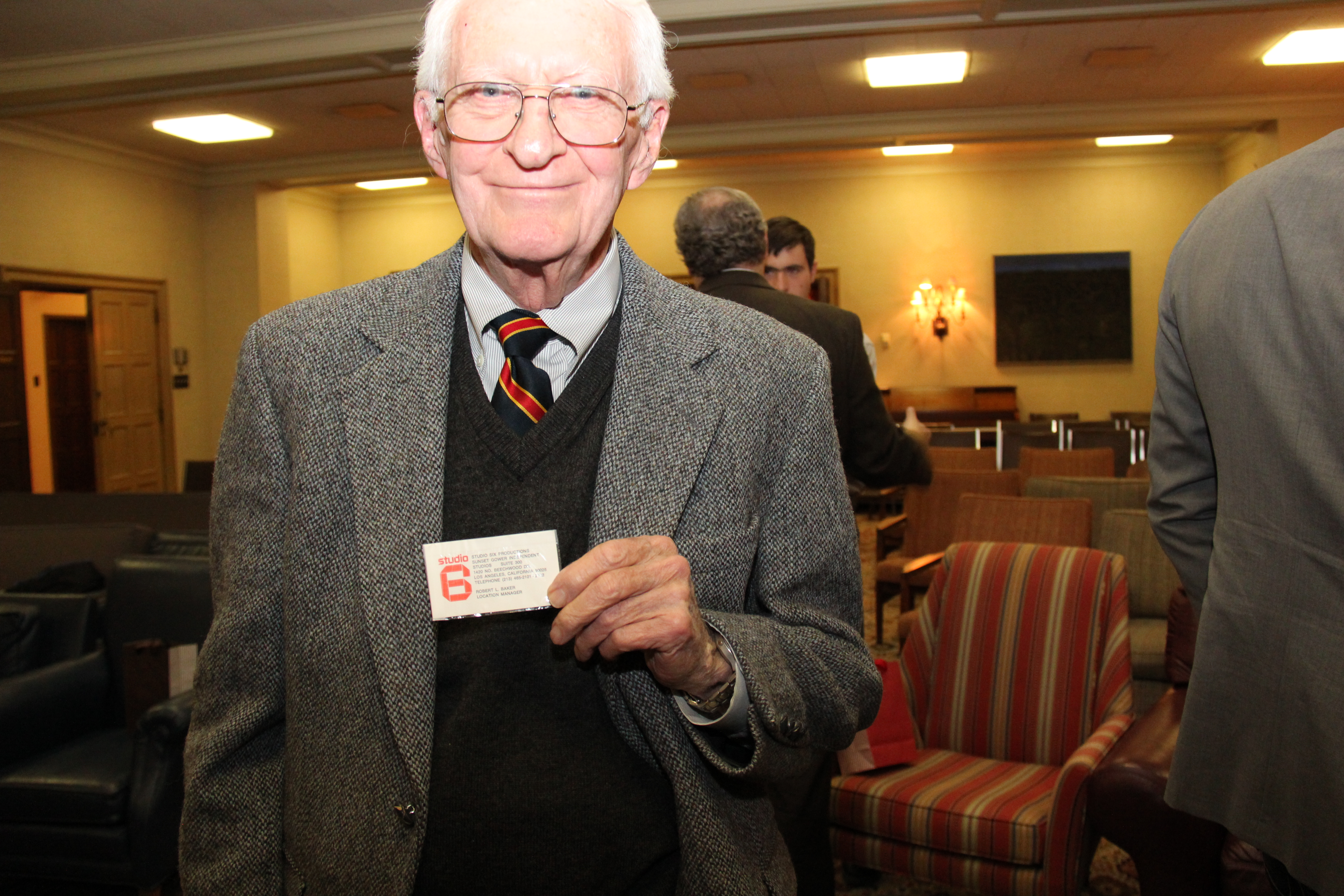
Robert G. Anders, a former Iran hostage, holding his fake Studio 6 card.

During the 1979 Iranian Revolution, the CIA set up a fake Hollywood film studio called Studio Six to aid in a plot to sneak American hostages out of Tehran. This mission was depicted in the 2012 film Argo starring Ben Affleck.

== Other uses ==
=== Tax avoidance ===
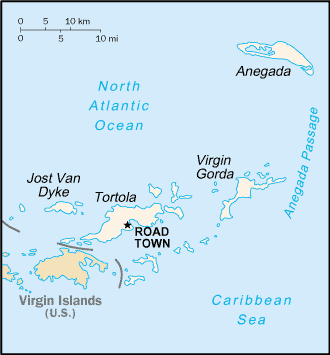
British Virgin Islands, a popular location to set up dummy companies.

Dummy corporations may be created to avoid tax through disguising the true profits of a corporation through the use of tax havens. The use of tax havens are particularly popular in the British Virgin Islands and many dummy corporations are created on the islands as a way to evade taxes. After a treaty enabling the islands to enjoy favourable tax treatment was terminated by the United States under the Reagan administration, the growth of the number of dummy corporations "exceeded beyond our wildest imaginations", according to the Financial Secretary Robert A. Mathavious. Although the tax havens itself are not illegal, the avoidance of taxation through the vehicle of tax havens are inherently illegal.

=== Defraud ===
Fraudsters may set up dummy corporations to create the illusion they are an existing corporation with a similar name. Similar to the "pump and dump" scheme, Fraudsters mislead investors in order to sell securities in the dummy corporation, in this case, making investors incorrectly believe "that they are buying shares in the real corporation". The sale of securities through a fraudulent corporation is inherently illegal.

=== Hiding identity ===
Another use is to prevent speculators from intruding on imminent plans of the parent organisation. Dummy corporations may also be used in crime to hide the identity of a criminal, similar to the use of a criminal alias.

Raymond Davis, a former Blairstown, New Jersey committee member, diverted $46,000 in public funds into a dummy corporation. The self-created dummy corporation was a vehicle to conceal his identity while stealing funds from a municipal complex project.

== Legal cases ==
Fraw Realty Co. Inc. v. Natanson, 261 N.Y. 396, was a court case heard before the Court of Appeals in the state of New York concerning the legal usage of dummy corporations to hide the true owner of assets between two companies. The Natanson brothers were the sole stockholders of Normar Real Estate Corporation and Malex Realty Corporation, which faulted when Malex's assets were taken over by Normar, citing that Normar was the "real owner" of the two corporations—although this agreement was only spoken about, not officially stated. The court ruled in favour of Fraw Realty, as the brothers relinquished their constructive trusts as their agreement was not explicitly stated.

Air-Sea Forwarders, Inc. v. Air Asia Company, LTD., and E-Systems, Inc. was a court case concerning the legal legitimacy of the CIA's involvement in Air Asia, a dummy corporation. The owner of Air-Sea Forwarders, Erwin Rautenberg, was awarded $6.2 million after the CIA illegally broke an "oral secret agreement" arranged in 1981. Rautenberg was promised by the airline, a subsidiary of the CIA, that his freight-forwarding company would be its "exclusive forwarding manager", but did not disclose that this exclusivity would be terminated in the case of a "good cause". Rautenberg won against the former dummy corporation, and was compensated for his loss.

Gelfand v. Horizon Corp was a court case challenging the legality of firing an employee over the sale of land through a dummy corporation. Gelfand, the plaintiff, was working as a real estate agent for Horizon Corporation, and sold a large tract of land to a dummy corporation he set up in collaboration with his wife and two interest holders without the knowledge of the real estate company. Gelfand subsequently sold the land to a third party for a profit of $57,500, and was immediately fired and denied his commission after his actions came to surface. Gelfand won the case against Horizon Corporation, and the company was entitled to pay Gelfand's commission of his sales excluding his sale with the third party, despite Gelfand's "breach of fiduciary duty".

== Controversy and problems ==
A dummy corporation is one way to "cook the books" in a dishonest attempt to hide the true financial status of a company. While the use of dummy corporations is not inherently illegal, the usage of these corporations can go against the ethics of the parent company, which can in turn spark controversy between the organisation and the public.

== See also ==
- Front organization
- Shell corporation
- Straw owner
- MEFO, a dummy company that covertly financed Nazi Germany's rearmament program prior to World War II.
