= Tetraethyl pyrophosphate =

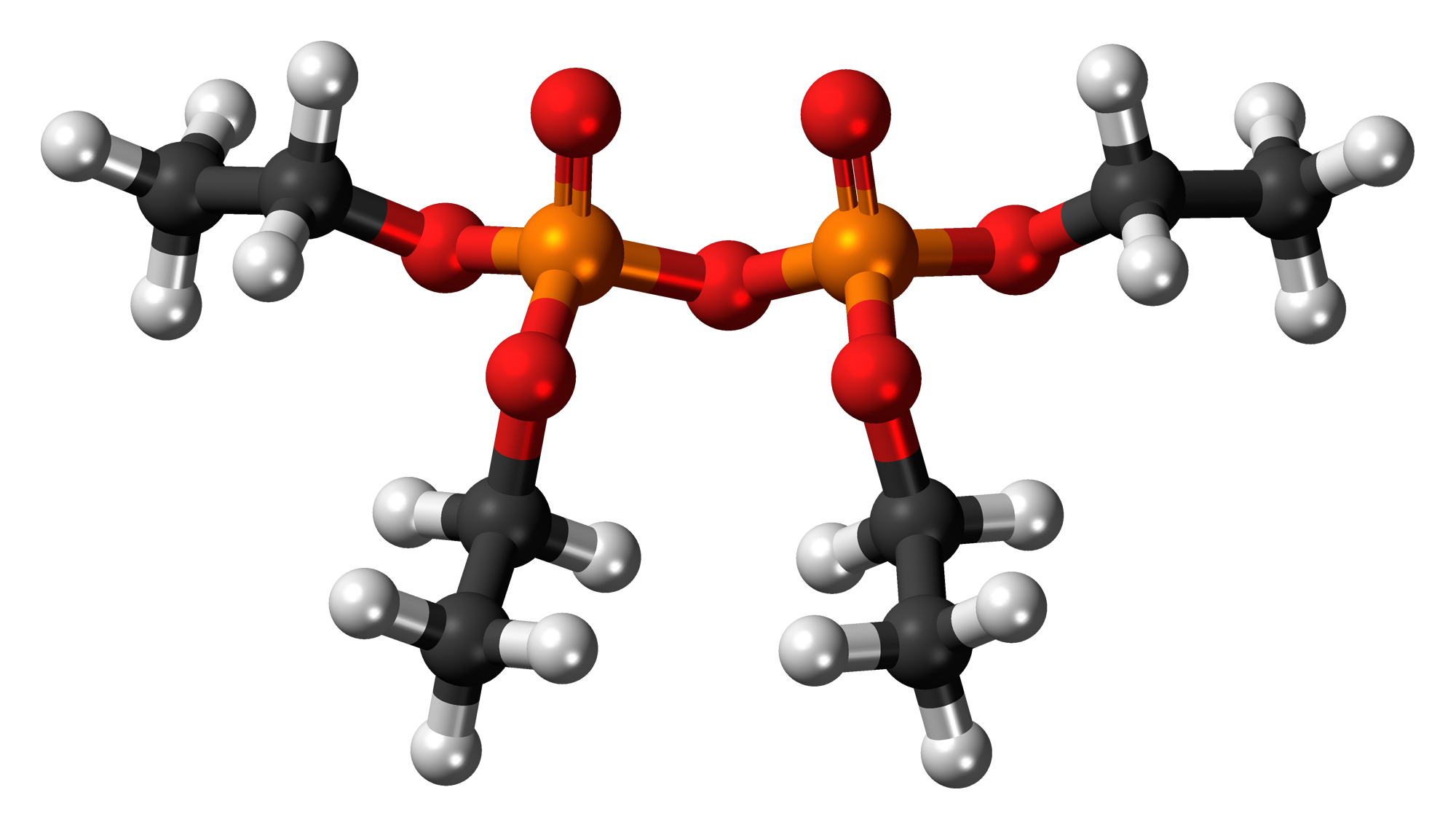

Names
- Preferred IUPAC name Tetraethyl diphosphate

Identifiers
CAS Number	107-49-3
3D model (JSmol)	Interactive image
ChEBI	CHEBI:82149
ChEMBL	ChEMBL293787
ChemSpider	7585
ECHA InfoCard	100.003.179
EC Number	203-495-3
KEGG	C19017
PubChem CID	7873
RTECS number	UX6825000
UNII	28QKT80KX2
UN number	3018 2783
CompTox Dashboard (EPA)	DTXSID3034957
- InChI: InChI=1S/C8H20O7P2/c1-5-11-16(9,12-6-2)15-17(10,13-7-3)14-8-4/h5-8H2,1-4H3 Key: IDCBOTIENDVCBQ-UHFFFAOYSA-N; InChI=1/C8H20O7P2/c1-5-11-16(9,12-6-2)15-17(10,13-7-3)14-8-4/h5-8H2,1-4H3 Key: IDCBOTIENDVCBQ-UHFFFAOYAI
- SMILES: O=P(OP(=O)(OCC)OCC)(OCC)OCC

Properties
Chemical formula	C_{8}H_{20}O_{7}P_{2}
Molar mass	290.189 g·mol^{−1}
Appearance	colorless to amber liquid
Odor	faint, fruity
Density	1.19 g/mL (20°C)
Melting point	0 °C; 32 °F; 273 K
Boiling point	decomposes
Solubility in water	miscible
Vapor pressure	0.0002 mmHg (20°C)

Hazards
- GHS labelling
Pictograms	(GHS06: Toxic) (GHS08: Health hazard)
Signal word	Danger
Hazard statements	H300, H310, H400
Precautionary statements	P262, P264, P270, P273, P280, P301+P310, P302+P350, P310, P321, P322, P330, P361, P363, P391, P405, P501
NFPA 704 (fire diamond)	4 1 1
- Lethal dose or concentration (LD, LC)
LD_{Lo} (lowest published)	0.5 mg/kg (rat, oral); 2.3 mg/kg (guinea pig, oral); 3 mg/kg (mouse, oral)
- NIOSH (US health exposure limits)
PEL (Permissible)	TWA 0.05 mg/m^{3} [skin]
REL (Recommended)	TWA 0.05 mg/m3 [skin]
IDLH (Immediate danger)	5 mg/m^{3}
- Except where otherwise noted, data are given for materials in their standard state (at 25 °C [77 °F], 100 kPa). verify (what is ?) Infobox references

Tetraethyl pyrophosphate, abbreviated TEPP, is an organophosphate compound with the formula [(C_{2}H_{5}O)_{2}P(O)]_{2}O. It is the tetraethyl derivative of pyrophosphate (P_{2}O_{7}^{4-}). It is a colorless oil that solidifies near room temperature. It is used as an insecticide. The compound hydrolyzes rapidly.

== Applications ==
TEPP is an insecticide to aphids, mites, spiders, mealybugs, leafhoppers, lygus bugs, thrips, leafminers, and many other pests. TEPP and other organophosphates are the most widely used pesticides in the U.S. due to their effectiveness and relative small impact on the environment because this organophosphate breaks down so easily.

TEPP has been used for treatment for myasthenia gravis, an autoimmune disease. The treatment would deliver an increase in strength.

== Synthesis ==
The synthesis by De Clermont and Moschnin was based on the earlier work by Alexander Williamson (who is well known for the Williamson ether synthesis). Their synthesis made use of ethyl iodide and silver salts to form esters in combination with pyrophosphate.

Ag_{4}P_{2}O_{7} + 4EtI → [(EtO)_{2}P(O)]_{2}O + 4AgI

Commercial routes to TEPP often use methods developed by Schrader, Woodstock, and Toy. Triethyl phosphate reacts with phosphorus oxychloride (Schrader's method) or phosphorus pentoxide (Woodstock's method). Alternatively, controlled hydrolysis of diethyl phosphorochloridate delivers the compound:

Synthesis of TEPP

The related tetrabenzylpyrophosphate is prepared by dehydration of dibenzylphosphoric acid:

2(RO)_{2}P(O)OH → [(EtO)_{2}P(O)]_{2}O + H_{2}O

== Hydrolysis ==
TEPP and most of the other organophosphates are susceptible to hydrolysis. The product is diethyl phosphate.

== Toxicity ==
TEPP is bioactive as an acetylcholinesterase inhibitor. It reacts with the serine hydroxyl group at the active site, preventing this enzyme from acting on its normal substrate, the neurotransmitter acetyl choline.

TEPP is highly toxic for all warm-blooded animals, including humans. There are three types of effects on these animals that have come forward during laboratory studies.

- DERMAL: LD_{50} = 2.4 mg/kg (male rat)
- ORAL: LD_{50} = 1.12 mg/kg (rat)

Death is mostly due to either respiratory failure and in some cases cardiac arrest. The route of absorption might be responsible for the range of effect on certain systems.

For cold-blooded animals the effects are slightly different. In a study with frogs, acute exposure caused a depression in the amount of erythrocytes in the blood. There was also a reduction of white bloodcells, especially the neutrophil granulocytes and lymphocytes. There was no visible damage to the bloodvessels to explain the loss of blood cells. Further there were no signs like hypersalivation or tears like in warm-blooded animals, though there was hypotonia leading to paralysis.

== History ==
It was first synthesized by Wladimir Moschnin in 1854 while working with Adolphe Wurtz. A fellow student Philippe de Clermont is often incorrectly credited as the discoverer of TEPP despite his recognition of the Moschnin primacy in two publications.

The ignorance about the potential toxicity of TEPP is evidenced by De Clermont himself, who described the taste of TEPP as having a burning taste and a peculiar odor. Even though TEPP has repeatedly been synthesized by other chemists during the years that followed, not until the 1930s had any adverse effects been observed. Furthermore, Philippe de Clermont has never been reported ill by his family up to his passing at the age of 90. In the meantime, organophosphorus chemistry has really started developing with the help of A. W. von Hofmann, Carl Arnold August Michaelis and Aleksandr Arbuzov.

It was not until 1932 before the first adverse effects of compounds similar to TEPP had been recognized. Willy Lange and Gerda von Krueger were the first to report such effects, about which the following statement was published in their article (in German):

"Interestingly, we report the strong effect of monofluorophosphate phosphoric acid alkyl esters on the human organism. The vapor of these compounds have a pleasant odor and sharply aromatic. After only a few minutes of inhaling the vapor, there is a strong pressure on the larynx, associated with shortness of breath. Then comes decreased awareness, opacities, and dazzling phenomena causing painful sensitivity of the eye to light. Only after several hours is there relief from these phenomena. They are apparently not caused by acidic decomposition products of the ester, but they are probably due to the Dialkyl monofluorophosphates themselves. The effects are exerted by very small amounts."

Starting in 1935 the German government started gathering information about new toxic substances, of which some were to be classified as secret by the German Ministry of Defence. Gerhard Schrader, who has become famous for his studies into organophosphorus insecticides and nerve gases, was one of the chemists who was also studying TEPP. In his studies, in particular his studies into the biological aspects, he noticed that this reagent could possibly be used as an insecticide. This would make the classification of the compound as secret disadvantageous for commercial firms.

Around the beginning of the Second World War, TEPP was discovered to be an inhibitor of cholinesterases. Schrader referred to the studies by Eberhard Gross, who was the first to recognize the mechanism of action for TEPP in 1939. More experiments were conducted including those of Hans Gremels, who confirmed Gross's work. Gremels was also involved in the development of nerve gases at that time. His studies involved several species of animals and human volunteers. Around that same time, atropine was discovered as a possible antidote for the anticholinesterase activity of TEPP.

After the Second World War, Schrader was among many German scientists who were interrogated by English scientists, among others. During the war, the English had been developing chemical weapons of their own to surprise their enemies. In these interrogations the existence of TEPP and other insecticides were disclosed. The existence of nerve gases, however also being disclosed by Schrader, was kept secret by the military.
