= German rearmament =

Military rearmament in Germany 1918–1939

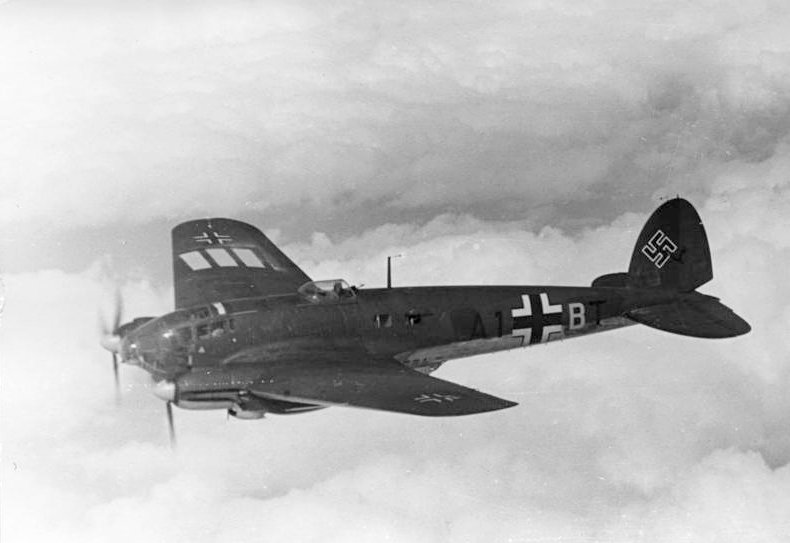
The Heinkel He 111, one of the technologically advanced aircraft that were designed and produced illegally in the 1930s as part of the clandestine German rearmament

German rearmament (Aufrüstung, German pronunciation: [ˈaʊ̯fˌʀʏstʊŋ]) was a policy and practice of rearmament carried out by Germany from 1918 to 1939 in violation of the Treaty of Versailles, which required German disarmament after World War I to prevent it from "starting another war". It began on a small, secret and informal basis shortly after the treaty was signed and was openly and massively expanded after the Nazi Party came to power in 1933.

Under the Weimar Republic, the early steps towards rearmament began with support for paramilitary groups including the Freikorps and Citizens' Defense, although the government banned most such groups by 1921. Secret cooperation between the German military and Soviet Russia began in 1921 and grew to include training in and manufacture of weapons banned by the Versailles Treaty. In 1926, the military leadership revealed its secret programs to the civilian government and with its cooperation embarked on two large rearmament programs designed to create a 21-division army by 1938. The poor economic conditions of the time seriously limited the results prior to the Nazi assumption of power in 1933.

Rearmament under the Nazi regime became considerably more aggressive. The programs and their financing remained secret until 1935, at which point Adolf Hitler announced them openly. The European states that had fought Germany in World War I reacted primarily through attempts to appease Hitler; many American corporations were involved in Germany's rearmament programs through ties to German companies.

== History ==
=== Weimar Republic ===
==== Overview ====
Germany's defeat in the First World War and the peace terms of the Treaty of Versailles shaped the thinking of the leadership of the Weimar Republic's armed forces, the Reichswehr. The treaty's disarmament provisions were intended to make the German army incapable of offensive action. It was limited to 100,000 men with 4,000 officers and no general staff; the navy could have at most 15,000 men and 1,500 officers. Germany was prohibited from having an air force, tanks, poison gas, heavy artillery, submarines or dreadnoughts. A large number of its ships and all of its air-related armaments were to be surrendered. Military leaders saw the greatly reduced army as an interim stage and a starting point for a larger military force not subject to restrictions.

To achieve the goal of rebuilding the military, the Reichswehr leadership was prepared to violate the Treaty of Versailles, which was also a law of the Republic. The illegal measures they took included providing Freikorps units and local Citizens' Defense groups (Einwohnerwehren) with military training and equipment; establishing the Black Reichswehr; creating secret funds such as were uncovered in the Lohmann Affair; disguising state intervention in the armaments industry (Montan-Schema); planning secretly for ramping up the German arms industry (Statistische Gesellschaft); conducting secret armaments research in cooperation with the Kaiser Wilhelm Society; continuing the banned general staff under the cover name Truppenamt; and cooperating militarily with the Soviet Union to gain fundamental tactical and technical knowledge. Until the beginning of the 1930s the extent and efficiency of the measures remained relatively low.

==== Early programs ====
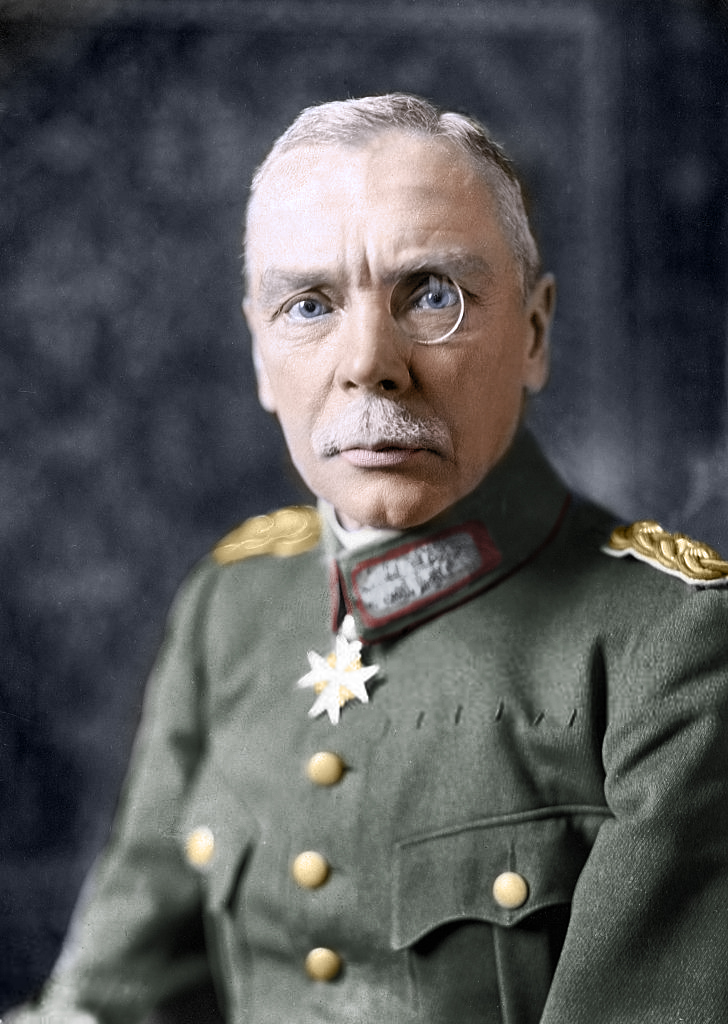
Hans von Seeckt, the second chief of staff of the Reichswehr

The first steps towards rebuilding Germany's fighting forces came with army and government use of paramilitary forces. In the early years of the Weimar Republic, the paramilitary Freikorps grew rapidly with the support of the republican government and its first Defense minister, Gustav Noske. The Freikorps units, often deployed in place of or to supplement regular army forces, were used primarily against communist uprisings. The strength began to wane after Hans von Seeckt became Chief of the Army Command in March 1920. He saw them as a sign of rebellion and limited the support they received from the government. Under pressure from France, which feared the building of an unofficial army outside the Versailles limits, the Freikorps were officially banned in May 1921. Seeckt decided then that the Reichswehr no longer had enough men available to guard the country's borders and formed the Black Reichswehr. It was an extra-legal paramilitary formation that was secretly part of the German military and had the support of Chancellor Joseph Wirth. Even though the Black Reichswehr grew to a strength estimated at 50,000 to 80,000 men, it never went into action and was disbanded in late 1923 following the failed Küstrin Putsch, which involved some of its members.

Units of the Citizens' Defense were formed in early 1919 to provide quick reinforcements against leftist revolutionary forces through the recruitment of small groups of civilians. It was supported and supplied by the government, the Reichswehr and the Freikorps. Because of repeated demands by the Inter-Allied Military Commission of Control to eliminate the Citizens' Defense, the government banned it on 24 May 1921. Many of its former members joined various "proto-Nazi" groups, as was also the case with the Freikorps and Black Reichswehr after they were banned.

Germany's secret rearmament program in the Soviet Union began in 1921 when the Ministry of Defence, with the approval of General Seeckt and the knowledge of Chancellor Joseph Wirth, established a Special Section R for the purpose. Initially it involved "armaments ventures" and camps for German soldiers in the USSR to train in the use of weapons forbidden by Versailles. In November 1922, not long after the Treaty of Rapallo between Germany and Soviet Russia was signed, the Soviet government and the Junkers Aircraft Company began to work together to build aircraft for Germany. Starting in 1924, German pilots were secretly trained at the Lipetsk fighter-pilot school on Junkers, Heinkel, and Dornier aircraft. The cooperation expanded in 1926 to include the manufacture of poison gas and the establishment of a tank training school near Kazan, but due to the hesitation of German companies to invest in projects in the Soviet Union, the new ventures did not progress very far. Government financing was hidden under phony budget headings and monitored by a high-ranking committee.

The German flag carrier Deutsche Luft Hansa, founded in 1926, used planes that were similar to military models current at the time, and the company's existence allowed for the growth of a domestic aircraft building industry and the training of pilots, both of which could be converted to military use in circumvention of the prohibition of Germany maintaining an air force. In 1930 Walter Dornberger was tasked with developing liquid fuel rockets for military purposes – a technology not mentioned in the Versailles Treaty – and under the Nazis he became involved in the V2 rocket program.

==== Government involvement ====
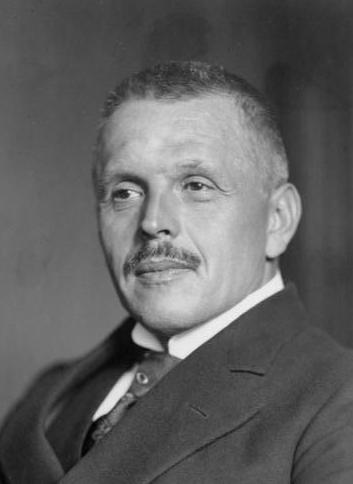
Defense Minister Otto Gessler

When Seeckt was dismissed as Chief of the Army High Command in October 1926, the new leadership under General Wilhelm Heye realised that only cooperation with the Reichstag (parliament) would provide political safeguards for the desired rearmament measures. It marked a turning point in the relationship between the Reichswehr and the government, which it viewed with scepticism. On 29 November 1926, Minister of Defence Otto Gessler, accompanied by the heads of both the army and navy, announced to the cabinet of Chancellor Wilhelm Marx that the secrecy towards state leadership would be abandoned and that from then on, comprehensive information would be provided about the rearmament measures that had been taken. He told them that the army "must always be in a position to provide the core, the training battalion so to speak, of a modern army" and that "certain security measures going beyond the peace treaty" were needed. He added that ""the cabinet would then have to decide to what extent it wanted to support the measures politically" and promised that the Reichswehr would follow the program the cabinet decided on.

On 6 December, the leadership of the Social Democratic Party (SPD), which was the largest party in the Reichstag but not part of the third Marx cabinet, met with Marx, Gessler and Foreign Minister Gustav Stresemann to protest the Reichswehr's secret rearmament and demand that it be discontinued. They presented materials of their own which detailed what they had learned and then threatened to disclose it publicly. Besides the Reichswehr's cooperation with Soviet Russia, the SPD had information showing that the Reichswehr had been working for years with right-wing paramilitary groups to create a disguised army reserve (the Citizens' Defense) and that the Reichswehr had a network of district officers to work with it, had organised military sports training and secret weapons caches. Gessler agreed to review the material, but the SPD did not trust him to make a clean breast of the situation so that it could be brought under Reichstag control. On 16 December 1926, ex-Chancellor Philipp Scheidemann (SPD) delivered a speech in the Reichstag condemning the secret cooperation with domestic right-wing groups and with the Soviet army. The reactions to the speech outside the SPD were overwhelmingly negative and had few consequences except for a rearrangement of Marx's cabinet. It shifted to the right, and Gessler remained minister of Defense.

==== Formal armament programs ====
In a cabinet meeting on 26 February 1927, General Heye, who had been convinced by the arguments of Colonel Kurt von Schleicher, the High Command's liaison in the Reichswehr Ministry, proposed to form a committee which would include the states and political parties in order to reach agreements on the secret rearmament. Chancellor Marx agreed, saying that the cabinet would have to bear the responsibility of financing the measures. Hermann Müller, his successor as chancellor, followed the same course.

After almost two years of preparatory work, the First Armament Program was approved by the Chief of Army Command on 29 September 1928 and adopted by the second Müller cabinet on 18 October. The aim of the program, which for the first time integrated the entire material rearmament plan of the army into a five-year program, was limited to emergency armaments for a 16-division army with a limited weapons stockpile. The goal was to be achieved by 1932 at a cost of 350 million Reichsmarks. The original plan for a 21-division army was rejected for economic reasons. The army received the lion's share; the navy received around 7 million Reichsmarks annually. The 350 million RM were covered in the budget by means of a secret fund with the full approval of all parties in the government. A State Secretaries' Committee was founded to approve the budget. It consisted of one representative each from the Bureau of Auditors, the Defense Ministry and the Finance Ministry. It was not under the oversight of the Reichstag.

The results of the first program were not impressive. In the spring of 1931, the army had only ten tanks, all of them still undergoing testing, and no anti-tank guns or two-centimeter machine guns for use from tanks that had gotten beyond the development phase.

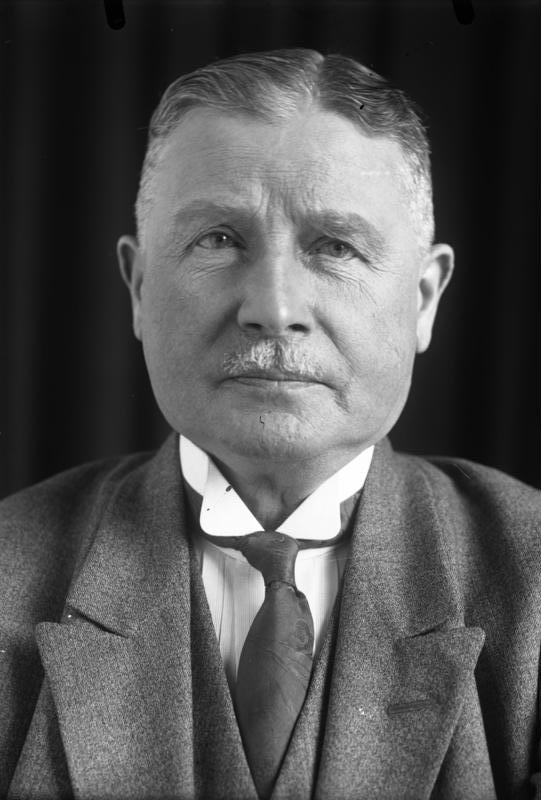
Wilhelm Groener, the mastermind of the second armament program

With the appointment of Wilhelm Groener as the new minister of Defense in January 1928 (fourth Marx cabinet), the armaments effort gained momentum, since Groener had the political, economic and military expertise to lead it. The Second Armament Program, which formed the basis for rearmament in Nazi Germany, was adopted in the spring of 1932. At a cost of 484 million Reichsmarks, the plan was to establish a 21-division army along with the necessary equipment, weapons and ammunition, plus a six-week stockpile. The air force, which was included for the first time, was to receive 110 million RM and consist of a total of 150 aircraft (78 reconnaissance, 54 fighters and 18 bombers). Because of the difficult economic conditions under the Great Depression, the program was designed for five years (April 1933 to March 1938). A modification in November provided that a total of 570,000 men should be actively under arms by the spring of 1938. Since it was a tightly calculated program designed for a maximum of armaments, it proved to be particularly sensitive to the economic situation, with the result that Groener was forced to request an additional one billion marks from the government over the five years. The financial picture was further exacerbated by the price dictates of some armaments companies. A handful of them had a virtual monopoly, since under the Treaty of Versailles only a small number of companies were allowed to manufacture armaments.

=== Nazi government era: 1933–1945 ===
After Adolf Hitler's rise to power in January 1933, the Nazi regime pursued a greatly enlarged and more aggressive version of rearmament. During its struggle for power, the Nazi Party (NSDAP) promised to recover Germany's lost national pride. It proposed military rearmament, claiming that the Treaty of Versailles and the acquiescence of the Weimar Republic were an embarrassment for all Germans. Rearmament became the topmost priority of the German government. Hitler then spearheaded one of the greatest expansions of industrial production Germany had ever seen.

==== Financing ====
The key players in German rearmament policies were Interior Minister Wilhelm Frick and Hjalmar Schacht, who had been president of the Reichsbank from 1923 to 1930. Dummy companies like MEFO were set up to finance the rearmament; MEFO obtained the large amount of money needed for the effort through the Mefo bills, a series of promissory notes issued by the government of Nazi Germany. Covert organisations like the Deutsche Verkehrsfliegerschule were established under a civilian guise to train pilots for the future Luftwaffe. Although available statistics do not include non-citizens or women, the massive Nazi rearmament policy led to almost full employment during the 1930s. The rearmament began a sudden change in fortune for many factories in Germany. Many industries were taken out of the deep crisis that had been induced by the Great Depression.

The creation of Mefo bills was the first fiscal step that Nazi Germany took on the road to rearmament. The Versailles Treaty prohibited the German government from rearming. Therefore, to rearm to the capacity that Hitler was trying to attain, the Reichsbank would have to extend the German government an almost unlimited amount of credit towards the rearmament program while hiding the accumulation of government debt from the international community. Contrary to this goal, the then Reichsbank President Hans Luther would only extend credit of one-hundred million Reichsmarks to rearmament, so to work around this, Hitler replaced Luther with Hjalmar Schacht. Schacht turned Luther's "employment creation bills" program into a system that would allow the German government to receive an unlimited amount of credit to put towards their program. Schacht created the Metallurgische Forschungs-G.m.b.H, a shell company that would issue short-term treasury notes, which would "function as a concealed form of money". The company would sell over 12 billion Reichsmarks worth of Mefo-bills by 1938, money which would all go to fund rearmament. Since Schacht's company did not function and instead just worked as a front for government-issued debt, this allowed the Nazi regime to conceal their rearmament funding from the international community. Without the creation of the Mefo program, the international community would have been immediately alarmed at the raising of funds by Nazi Germany, and the rearmament program would be threatened by external intervention.

In another instance of money market fraud, one can examine Schacht's manipulation of the American international exchange system, which provided Germany an arbitrage opportunity allowing them to fund their rearmament program. After attaining the position of Reichsbank President in 1933, Schacht told the American government that the German corporations, government, and municipalities would be unable to pay their interest payments to American bondholders on American denominated debt. The cancellation of interest payments was due to the lack of foreign exchange that Germany claimed they had in their treasury. Although German exchange resources had been depleted during the great depression, the German government was not short enough on foreign exchange to completely stop paying bond coupon payments. Instead, the German government wanted to use the foreign exchange to pay for rearmament and fund its activities abroad, an example being the support of Konrad Henlein and the Sudeten German Party In doing this, Schacht realised an arbitrage opportunity. In defaulting on their debt, the Germans would subsequently decrease the value of the debt on the American markets, where they could then go and repurchase the bonds with the "allegedly nonexistent foreign exchange at a fraction of their face value". The debt purchaser could then sell the bond back to the issuer and exchange the American dollar-denominated debt for Reichsmarks. The German government could then take the foreign exchange that they had received and pay for their rearmament program, an example being purchasing American plane parts with the US dollars they accumulated from this program. Schacht took the program even further; he would allow German exporters to use a portion of their foreign exchange reserves to purchase the debt. They would then turn around and sell the debt back to the debtors for Reichsmarks, subsidising exports at the expense of the bondholder while allowing German debtors to repurchase their debt at a large discount. The American bondholder would risk the value of the bond dropping significantly, or they could resell to the German exporters. Schacht's plan allowed the Nazi Regime to make a foreign exchange trove that they could use for rearmament and support their propaganda efforts abroad.

==== Open rearmament ====
By 1935, Hitler was open about rejecting the military restrictions set forth by the Treaty of Versailles. On 7 March 1936, military forces of Nazi Germany entered the Rhineland (Remilitarisation of the Rhineland). France (PM was Pierre-Étienne Flandin) and Britain (PM was Ramsay MacDonald) did not react. Rearmament was announced on 16 March 1935, as was the reintroduction of conscription.

Some large industrial companies, which had until then specialised in certain traditional products began to diversify and introduce innovative ideas in their production pattern. Shipyards, for example, created branches that began to design and build aircraft. Thus, the German rearmament provided an opportunity for advanced, and sometimes revolutionary, technological improvements, especially in the field of aeronautics.

Work by labour historians has determined that many German workers in the 1930s identified passionately with the weapons they were building. While this was in part due to the high status of the skilled work required in the armaments industries, it was also to do with the weapons themselves – they were assertions of national strength, the common property of the German nation. Adam Tooze noted in 2008 that an instruction manual given to tank crews during the war made clear this connection:

For every shell you fire, your father has paid 100 Reichsmarks in taxes, your mother has worked for a week in the factory ... The Tiger costs all told 800,000 Reichsmarks and 300,000 hours of labour. Thirty thousand people had to give an entire week's wages, 6,000 people worked for a week so that you can have a Tiger. Men of the Tiger, they all work for you. Think what you have in your hands!

The Spanish Civil War (1936–1939) provided an ideal testing ground for the proficiency of the new weapons produced by the German factories during the rearmament years. Many aeronautical bombing techniques (i.e. dive bombing) were tested by the Condor Legion German expeditionary forces against the Republican Government on Spanish soil with the permission of Generalíssimo Francisco Franco. Hitler insisted, however, that his long-term designs were peaceful, a strategy labelled as Blumenkrieg ("Flower War"). Rearmament in the 1930s saw the development of different theories of how to prepare the German economy for total war. The first amongst these was 'defence in depth' which was put forward by Georg Thomas. He suggested that the German economy needed to achieve autarky (or self-sufficiency), and one of the main proponents behind this was I.G. Farben. Hitler never put his full support behind autarky and aimed for the development of 'defence in breadth' which espoused the development of the armed forces in all areas and was not concerned with preparing the German war economy.

The rearmament program quickly increased the size of the German officer corps, and organising the growing army would be their primary task until the beginning of World War II on 1 September 1939. Count Johann von Kielmansegg (1906–2006) later said that the very involved process of outfitting 36 divisions kept him and his colleagues from reflecting on larger issues.

In any event, Hitler could boast on 26 September 1938 in the Berlin Sportpalast that after giving orders to rearm the Wehrmacht he could "openly admit: we rearmed to an extent the like of which the world has not yet seen".

== Toleration by other states ==
Since World War II, both academics and laypeople have discussed the extent to which German rearmament was an open secret among national governments. The failure of Allied national governments to confront and intervene earlier in Germany is often discussed in the context of the appeasement policies of the 1930s. A central question is whether the Allies should have drawn "a line in the sand" earlier than September 1939, which might have resulted in a less devastating war and perhaps a prevention of the Holocaust. However, it is also possible that anything that caused Hitler not to overreach as soon and as far as he did would only have condemned Europe to a more slowly growing Nazi empire, leaving plenty of time for a Holocaust later, and a successful German nuclear weapons program, safely behind a Nazi version of an Iron Curtain. George F. Kennan stated: "Unquestionably, such a policy might have enforced a greater circumspection on the Nazi regime and caused it to proceed more slowly with the actualization of its timetable. From this standpoint, firmness at the time of the reoccupation of the Rhineland (7 March 1936) would probably have yielded even better results than firmness at the time of Munich."

=== American corporate involvement ===
Some 150 American corporations took part in German rearmament, supplying German companies with everything from raw materials to technology and patent knowledge. This took place through a complex network of business interests, joint ventures, cooperation agreements, and cross-ownership between American and German corporations and their subsidiaries. Resources supplied to German companies (some of which were MEFO front companies established by the German state) by American corporations included: synthetic rubber production technology (DuPont and Standard Oil of New Jersey), communication equipment (ITT), computing and tabulation machines (IBM), aviation technology (which was used to develop the Junkers Ju 87 bomber), fuel (Standard Oil of New Jersey and Standard Oil of California), military vehicles (Ford and General Motors), funding (through investment, brokering services, and loans by banks like the Union Banking Corporation), collaboration agreements, production facilities and raw materials. DuPont owned stocks in IG Farben and Degussa AG, who controlled Degesch, the producer of Zyklon B.

This involvement was motivated not only by financial gain, but in some cases by ideology as well. Irénée du Pont, director and former president of DuPont, was a supporter of Nazi racial theory and a proponent of eugenics.

== See also ==
- Anglo-German Naval Agreement
- MEFO
- Deutsche Verkehrsfliegerschule
- British rearmament
- West German rearmament
