= Ethyl cyanohydroxyiminoacetate =

Names
- Preferred IUPAC name Ethyl (2Z)-2-cyano-2-(hydroxyimino)acetate
- Other names Oxyma

Identifiers
CAS Number	3849-21-6
3D model (JSmol)	Interactive image
ChemSpider	4911611
ECHA InfoCard	100.021.230
EC Number	223-351-3
PubChem CID	6399475
UNII	2PHR89MH6P
CompTox Dashboard (EPA)	DTXSID40959361
- InChI: InChI=1S/C5H6N2O3/c1-2-10-5(8)4(3-6)7-9/h9H,2H2,1H3/b7-4- Key: LCFXLZAXGXOXAP-DAXSKMNVSA-N
- SMILES: CCOC(=O)/C(=N\O)/C#N

Properties
Chemical formula	C_{5}H_{6}N_{2}O_{3}
Molar mass	142,11 g·mol^{−1}
Appearance	white powder
- Except where otherwise noted, data are given for materials in their standard state (at 25 °C [77 °F], 100 kPa). Infobox references

Ethyl cyanohydroxyiminoacetate (oxyma) is the oxime of ethyl cyanoacetate and finds use as an additive for carbodiimides, such as dicyclohexylcarbodiimide (DCC) in peptide synthesis. It acts as a neutralizing reagent for the basicity or nucleophilicity of the DCC due to its pronounced acidity (pKa 4.60) and suppresses base catalyzed side reactions, in particular racemization.

== Production ==
Ethyl cyanohydroxyiminoacetate is obtained in the reaction of ethyl cyanoacetate and nitrous acid (from sodium nitrite and acetic acid) in 87% yield.

Synthese von Hydroxyiminocyanessigsäureethylester

Because of the rapid hydrolysis of the ester, the reaction should be carried out at pH 4.5, in buffered phosphoric acid the product can even be obtained in virtually quantitative yield.

The compound can be purified by recrystallization from ethanol or ethyl acetate.

Compared with the benzotriazole derivatives 1-hydroxybenzotriazole (HOBt) and 1-hydroxy-7-azabenzotriazole (HOAt) (which are widely used as peptide-linking reagents but are explosive), ethyl cyanohydroxyiminoacetate exhibits a markedly slowed thermal decomposition on heating.

== Properties ==
Ethyl cyanohydroxyiminoacetate is a white solid which is soluble in many solvents common in the synthesis of peptides, such as dichloromethane or dimethylformamide (DMF). In crystalline form, the compound is present as an oxime, whereas it exists as a salt or in a strongly basic solution predominantly as a tautomeric nitroso isomer in anionic form.

== Applications ==
Owing to the simple preparative accessibility, the uncritical behavior at temperatures below 80 °C and in particular because of the high yields and the low racemization of the peptides obtained, ethyl cyanohydroxyiminoacetate has now become widely used as an additive in peptide syntheses.

Ethyl cyanohydroxyiminoacetate can be used as a coupling additive in the conventional peptide linking in solution, as in automated Merrifield synthesis on a solid-phase peptide synthesis, together with coupling reagents such as carbodiimides (for example dicyclohexylcarbodiimide (DCC)), diisopropylcarbodiimide (DIC) or the water-soluble 1-ethyl-3-(3-dimethylaminopropyl)carbodiimide (EDCI)).

Dipeptidsynthese mit Oxyma

For example, the stepwise liquid-phase synthesis of the dipeptide Z-L-Phg-L-Val-OMe yields the LL-product with 81-84% which is free from racemic DL dipeptide, using From N-protected Z-L-α-phenylglycine (with the benzyloxycarbonyl group, Z group) and L-valine methyl ester with the coupling reagent DIC and the additive ethyl cyanohydroxyiminoacetate.

More recently, a variety of derivatives of ethyl cyanohydroxyiminoacetate (Oxyma) have been developed as acylation reagents, such as Fmoc-oxyma for the transfer of the fluorenylmethoxycarbonyl protective group

Fmoc-Oxyma-Synthese

or the coupling reagent COMU which is readily soluble as a dimethylmorpholine-uronium salt and which, like Oxyma, is superior to the standard additive HOBt for the suppression of racemization and acylation efficiency and is comparable to HOAt without presenting an explosion risk such as the benzotriazoles.

With water-soluble derivatives of ethyl cyanohydroxyiminoacetate (glyceroacetonide-oxyma) as additive and DIC as coupling reagent even in weakly basic aqueous solutions the linking of protected amino acids to oligopeptides is possible with a yield of 95% and a diastereomeric excess of> 99% using the model substances Z-L-Phg-OH and L-H-Pro-NH_{2}.

Dipeptidsynthese mit Glyceroacetonid-Oxyma

In the coupling of amino acids, frequently occurring secondary reactions largely suppressed, which would be the formation of symmetrical acid anhydrides, racemization and epimerization and the cyclization to oxazolinones or - especially for dipeptides - to 2,5-diketopiperazines.
