= HBTU =

Names
- IUPAC name 1-oxo-3H-1λ⁵,2,3-benzotriazole-3-carboximidamidium hexafluorophosphate
- Other names: HBTU; 2-(1H-benzotriazol-1-yl)-1,1,3,3-tetramethyluronium hexafluorophosphate; 3-[Bis(dimethylamino)methyliumyl]-3H-benzotriazol-1-oxide hexafluorophosphate

Identifiers
CAS Number	94790-37-1
3D model (JSmol)	Interactive image
ChemSpider	2014894
ECHA InfoCard	100.133.815
EC Number	619-076-7
PubChem CID	2733084
UNII	X5I03TZQ8D
CompTox Dashboard (EPA)	DTXSID101335774 DTXSID00915302, DTXSID101335774
- InChI: InChI=1S/C11H16N5O.F6P/c1-14(2)11(15(3)4)17-16-10-8-6-5-7-9(10)12-13-16;1-7(2,3,4,5)6/h5-8H,1-4H3;/q+1;-1 Key: UQYZFNUUOSSNKT-UHFFFAOYSA-N
- SMILES: CN(C)C(=[N+](C)C)ON1C2=CC=CC=C2N=N1.F[P-](F)(F)(F)(F)F

Properties
Chemical formula	C_{11}H_{16}F_{6}N_{5}OP
Molar mass	379.247 g·mol^{−1}
Appearance	White crystals
Melting point	200 °C (392 °F; 473 K)

Hazards
- Occupational safety and health (OHS/OSH)
Main hazards	Irritant
- GHS labelling
Pictograms	(GHS07: Exclamation mark)
Signal word	Warning
Hazard statements	H315, H319, H335
Precautionary statements	P210, P240, P241, P261, P264, P271, P280, P302+P352, P304+P340, P305+P351+P338, P312, P332+P313, P337+P313, P362, P370+P378, P403+P233, P405, P501
- Except where otherwise noted, data are given for materials in their standard state (at 25 °C [77 °F], 100 kPa). Infobox references

HBTU (hexafluorophosphate benzotriazole tetramethyl uronium) is a coupling reagent used in solid phase peptide synthesis. It was introduced in 1978 and shows resistance against racemization. It is used because of its mild activating properties.

HBTU is prepared by reaction of hydroxybenzotriazole with TCFH under basic conditions and was assigned to a uronium type structure, presumably by analogy with the corresponding phosphonium salts, which bear a positive carbon atom instead of the phosphonium residue. Later, it was shown by X-ray analysis that salts crystallize as guanidinium rather than the corresponding uronium salts.

== Mechanism ==
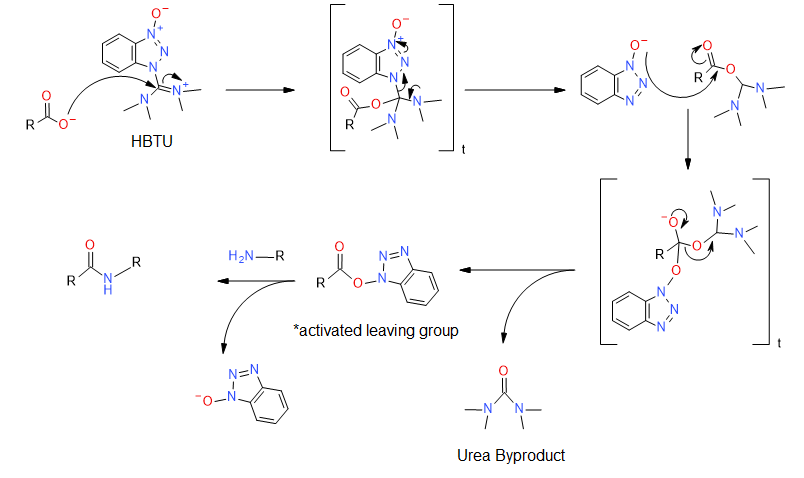
This scheme depicts the general mechanistic steps of HBTU creating an activated ester out of the carboxylate anion of the acid substrate. The deprotination of the carboxylic acid and the aminolysis of the activated ester are not shown.

HBTU activates carboxylic acids by forming a stabilized HOBt (Hydroxybenzotriazole) leaving group. The activated intermediate species attacked by the amine during aminolysis is the HOBt ester.

To create the HOBt ester, the carboxyl group of the acid attacks the imide carbonyl carbon of HBTU. Subsequently, the displaced anionic benzotriazole N-oxide attacks of the acid carbonyl, giving the tetramethyl urea byproduct and the activated ester. Aminolysis displaces the benzotriazole N-oxide to form the desired amide.

== Safety ==
In vivo dermal sensitization studies according to OECD 429 confirmed HBTU is a moderate skin sensitizer, showing a response at 0.9 wt% in the Local Lymph Node Assay (LLNA) placing it in Globally Harmonized System of Classification and Labelling of Chemicals (GHS) Dermal Sensitization Category 1A. Thermal hazard analysis by differential scanning calorimetry (DSC) shows HBTU is potentially explosive.

== See also ==
- EDC
- HATU
- BOP reagent
- PyBOP
- PyAOP reagent
