= HCTU =

Names
- IUPAC name O-(1H-6-Chlorobenzotriazole-1-yl)-1,1,3,3-tetramethyluronium hexafluorophosphate
- Other names 2-(6-Chloro-1H-benzotriazole-1-yl)-1,1,3,3-tetramethylaminium hexafluorophosphate

Identifiers
CAS Number	330645-87-9
3D model (JSmol)	Interactive image
ChemSpider	17339147
ECHA InfoCard	100.116.975
EC Number	608-825-3
PubChem CID	42624899
CompTox Dashboard (EPA)	DTXSID00655231
- InChI: InChI=1S/C11H15ClN5O.F6P/c1-15(2)11(16(3)4)18-17-10-7-8(12)5-6-9(10)13-14-17;1-7(2,3,4,5)6/h5-7H,1-4H3;/q+1;-1 Key: ZHHGTMQHUWDEJF-UHFFFAOYSA-N
- SMILES: CN(C)C(=[N+](C)C)ON1C2=C(C=CC(=C2)Cl)N=N1.F[P-](F)(F)(F)(F)F

Properties
Chemical formula	C_{11}H_{15}ClF_{6}N_{5}OP
Molar mass	413.69 g·mol^{−1}
Appearance	White to off white powder
Melting point	>185 °C

Hazards
- GHS labelling
Pictograms	(GHS02: Flammable) (GHS07: Exclamation mark)
Signal word	Warning
Hazard statements	H228, H302, H315, H319, H335
Precautionary statements	P210, P240, P241, P261, P264, P270, P271, P280, P301+P312, P302+P352, P304+P340, P305+P351+P338, P312, P321, P330, P332+P313, P337+P313, P362, P370+P378, P403+P233, P405, P501
- Except where otherwise noted, data are given for materials in their standard state (at 25 °C [77 °F], 100 kPa). Infobox references

HCTU is an amidinium coupling reagent used in peptide synthesis. It is analogous to HBTU. The HOBt moiety has a chlorine in the 6 position which improves reaction rates and the synthesis of difficult couplings HCTU and related reagents containing the 6-chloro-1-hydroxybenzotriazole moiety can be prepared by reaction with TCFH under basic conditions. It can exist in an N-form (guanidinium) or an O-form (uronium), but the N-form is generally considered to be more stable for this class of reagent. In vivo dermal sensitization studies according to OECD 429 confirmed HCTU is a strong skin sensitizer, showing a response at 0.50 wt% in the Local Lymph Node Assay (LLNA) placing it in Globally Harmonized System of Classification and Labelling of Chemicals (GHS) Dermal Sensitization Category 1A.
