= Tetramethylurea =

Names
- Preferred IUPAC name Tetramethylurea
- Other names 1,1,3,3-Tetramethylurea

Identifiers
CAS Number	632-22-4
3D model (JSmol)	Interactive image
ChEBI	CHEBI:84278
ChEMBL	ChEMBL11949
ChemSpider	11930
ECHA InfoCard	100.010.159
EC Number	211-173-9
PubChem CID	12437
UNII	2O1EJ64031
CompTox Dashboard (EPA)	DTXSID1060893
- InChI: InChI=1S/C5H12N2O/c1-6(2)5(8)7(3)4/h1-4H3 Key: AVQQQNCBBIEMEU-UHFFFAOYSA-N
- SMILES: CN(C)C(=O)N(C)C

Properties
Chemical formula	C_{5}H_{12}N_{2}O
Molar mass	116.164 g·mol^{−1}
Appearance	Colorless liquid
Density	0.968 g/mL
Melting point	−1.2 °C (29.8 °F; 271.9 K)
Boiling point	176.5 °C (349.7 °F; 449.6 K)

Hazards
- GHS labelling
Pictograms	(GHS07: Exclamation mark) (GHS08: Health hazard)
Signal word	Danger
Hazard statements	H302, H360, H361
Precautionary statements	P201, P202, P264, P270, P281, P301+P312, P308+P313, P330, P405, P501
- Except where otherwise noted, data are given for materials in their standard state (at 25 °C [77 °F], 100 kPa). Infobox references

Tetramethylurea (TMU) is the organic compound with the formula (Me_{2}N)_{2}CO. It is a substituted urea. This colorless liquid is used as an aprotic-polar solvent, especially for aromatic compounds and is used e. g. for Grignard reagents. TMU has a mild aromatic odor and, unlike other compounds of urea, is a colorless liquid.

== Production ==
TMU is obtained by the reaction of dimethylamine with phosgene in aqueous sodium hydroxide in a 2:1 ratio. A similar method combines dimethylcarbamoyl chloride with excess dimethylamine. This reaction is highly exothermic. The removal of the resulting dimethylamine hydrochloride requires some effort.

Synthesis of tetramethylurea from phosgene

The reaction of diphenylcarbonate with dimethylamine in an autoclave is also effective.

Synthesis of tetramethylurea from diphenylcarbonate

TMU is formed upon the oxygenation of tetrakis(dimethylamino)ethylene (TDAE).

Oxidation of TDAE (Chemiluminescence)

TMU is also a common by-product formed in amide bond forming reactions and peptide synthesis with uronium and guanidinium-based reagents including HATU, HBTU, and TCFH.

== Applications ==
TMU is miscible with a variety of organic compounds, including acids (e.g. acetic acid), bases (e.g. pyridine), and organic substances (e.g. ε-caprolactam, benzoic acid). TMU can also dissolve some inorganic salts such as silver nitrate and sodium iodide. TMU is often used in place of hexamethylphosphoramide (HMPA), which is a suspected carcinogen.

TMU is suitable as a reaction medium for the polymerization of aromatic diacid chlorides (such as isophthalic acid) and aromatic diamines (such as 1,3-diaminobenzene (m-phenylenediamine)) to aramids such as poly (m-phenylene isophthalamide) (Nomex)

The polymerization of 4-amino benzoic acid chloride hydrochloride in TMU provides isotropic viscous solutions of poly(p-benzamide) (PPB), which can be directly spun into fibers.

Polymerisation of p-Aminobenzoylchloride to PPB

In a TMU-LiCl mixture, stable isotropic solutions can be obtained up to a PPB polymer concentration of 14%.

TMU also dissolves cellulose ester and swells other polymers such as polycarbonates, polyvinyl chloride, or aliphatic polyamides - usually at elevated temperature.

Strong and hindered non-nucleophilic guanidine bases are accessible from TMU in a simple manner, which are in contrast to the fused amidine bases DBN or DBU not alkylated.

Synthesis of 2-tert.-Butyl-1,1,3,3-tetramethylguanidin aus TMU

A modification of the Koenigs-Knorr reaction for building glycosides from 2,3,4,6-tetra-O-acetyl-α-D-glucopyranosyl bromide (acetobromoglucose) originates from S. Hanessian who used the silver salt silver trifluoromethanesulfonate (TfOAg) and as a proton acceptor tetramethylurea. This process variant is characterized by a simplified process control, high anomeric purity and high yields of the products. If the reaction is carried out with acetobromoglucose and silver triflate/tetramethylurea at room temperature, then tetramethylurea reacts not only as a base, but also with the glycosyl to form a good isolable uroniumtriflates in 56% yield.

Formation of Uronium salts with Acetobromoglucose and TMU

== Safety ==
The acute toxicity of TMU is moderate. However, it is embryotoxic and teratogenic towards several animal species. TMU has been demonstrated to exhibit dermal and eye irritation. The sensitization potential of TMU was shown to be low compared (non-sensitizing at 1% in LLNA testing according to OECD 429).
