= Orthogonality (chemistry) =

Concept involving selective reactions

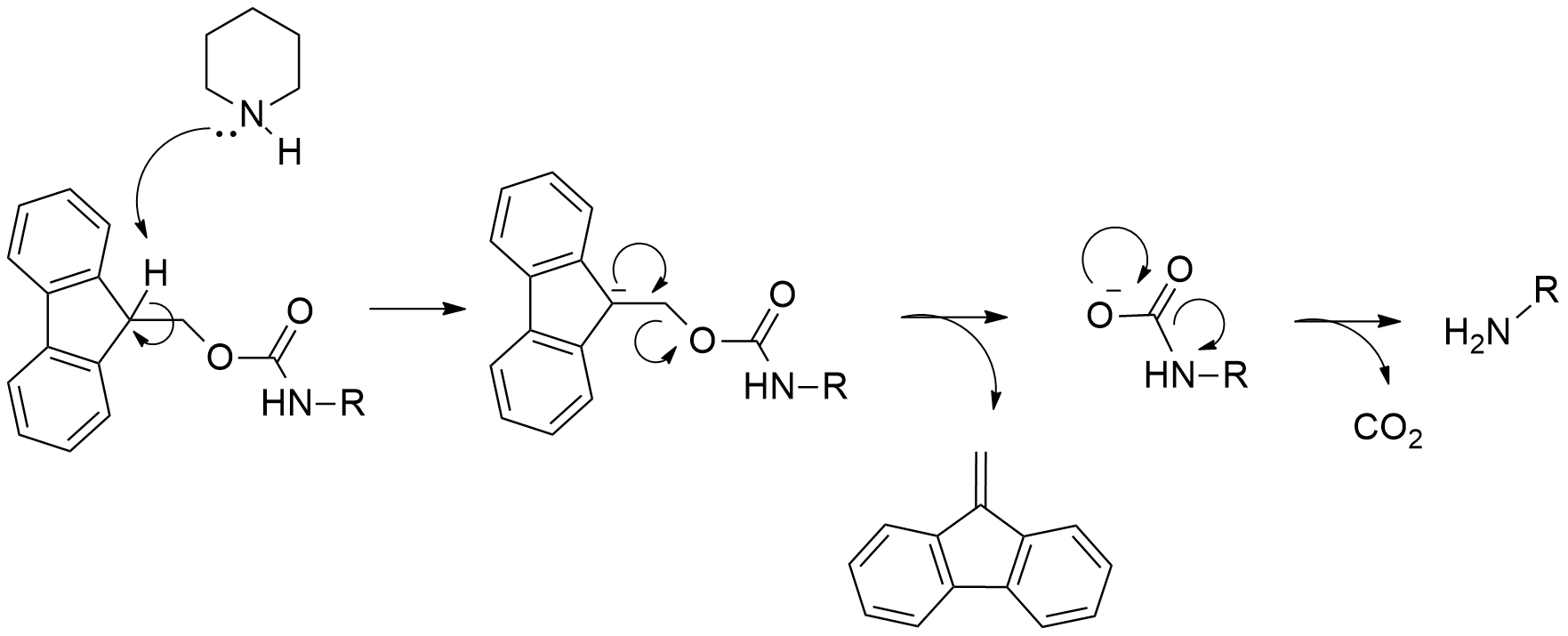
Fmoc removal requires base.

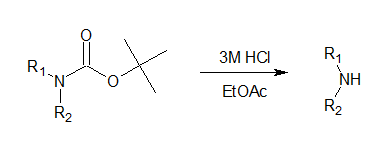
Boc removal requires acid.

In chemistry, orthogonality-originating from the Greek ortho(straight) and gonia(straight)- is when two or more protecting groups in a chemical compound can be removed under conditions that do not affect the other(s). Two such protecting groups are said to be orthogonal. A classic example is the Fmoc group which requires base to be removed, and the Boc group which requires acid; treatment with base will not affect the Boc groups, and treatment with acid will not affect the Fmoc groups.

Orthogonal protection is widely used in organic chemistry and synthetic chemistry to allow chemists to perform multiple transformations on complex molecules while controlling the order in which functional groups are revealed.

== Principle ==
Many organic molecules contain multiple functional groups that may react under similar conditions. Protecting groups are therefore introduced temporarily to prevent unwanted reactions during synthesis. In an orthogonal protecting group strategy, different protecting groups are chosen so that each responds to a specific set of reaction conditions.

For example, one protecting group may be removed by acidic conditions, while another may be removed by basic conditions. Because the removal of one group does not affect the other, the two groups are considered orthogonal.

== Examples ==
=== Fmoc and Boc protecting groups ===
A commonly used example of orthogonal protection involves the Fmoc (9-fluorenylmethoxycarbonyl) and Boc (tert-butoxycarbonyl) groups, which are frequently used for the protection of amine functional groups.

The Fmoc group is removed under basic conditions, commonly using piperidine, while the Boc group is removed under acidic conditions, often using trifluoroacetic acid. Treatment with a base removes Fmoc without affecting Boc, and treatment with acid removes Boc without removing Fmoc.

This orthogonal relationship allows selective manipulation of different parts of a molecule during multi-step synthesis.

=== Other orthogonal protecting group systems ===
Other examples of orthogonal protecting group pairs include:

- Benzyl (Bn) protecting groups, which can often be removed by hydrogenolysis, while other acid- or base-sensitive groups remain intact.
- Silyl ether protecting groups, which can be selectively removed using fluoride sources such as tetrabutylammonium fluoride.
- Photolabile protecting groups, which can be removed using light without affecting many chemically sensitive groups.

== Applications ==
Orthogonal protecting group strategies are important in the synthesis of complex organic molecules, including natural products, pharmaceutical drugs, and biologically active compounds. They are particularly useful in peptide synthesis, where multiple amino acid side chains require selective protection during assembly.

In solid-phase peptide synthesis, the Fmoc strategy relies on orthogonal protection, allowing repeated cycles of amino acid addition while maintaining control over the growing peptide chain.

Orthogonal approaches are also used in carbohydrate chemistry, nucleoside synthesis, and chemical biology, where precise control over molecular transformations is required.

== See also ==
- Protecting group
- Organic synthesis
- Functional group
- Peptide synthesis
