= N,N'-Dicyclohexylcarbodiimide =

N,N′-Dicyclohexylcarbodiimide
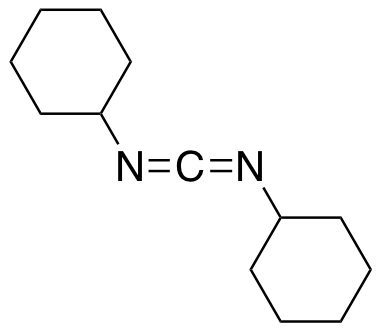
- Skeletal formula of dicyclohexylcarbodiimide

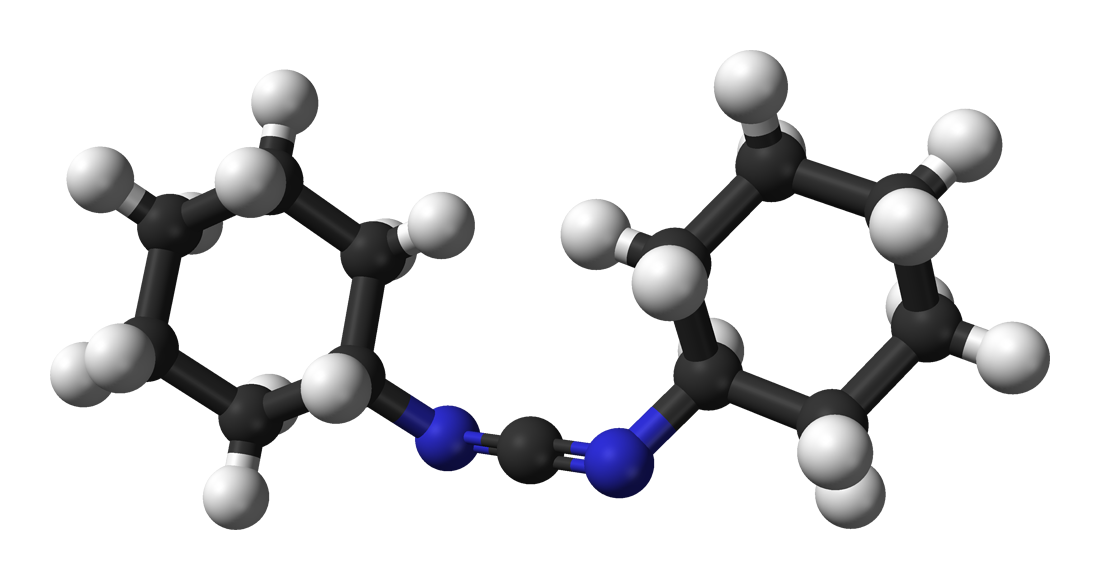
- Ball-and-stick model

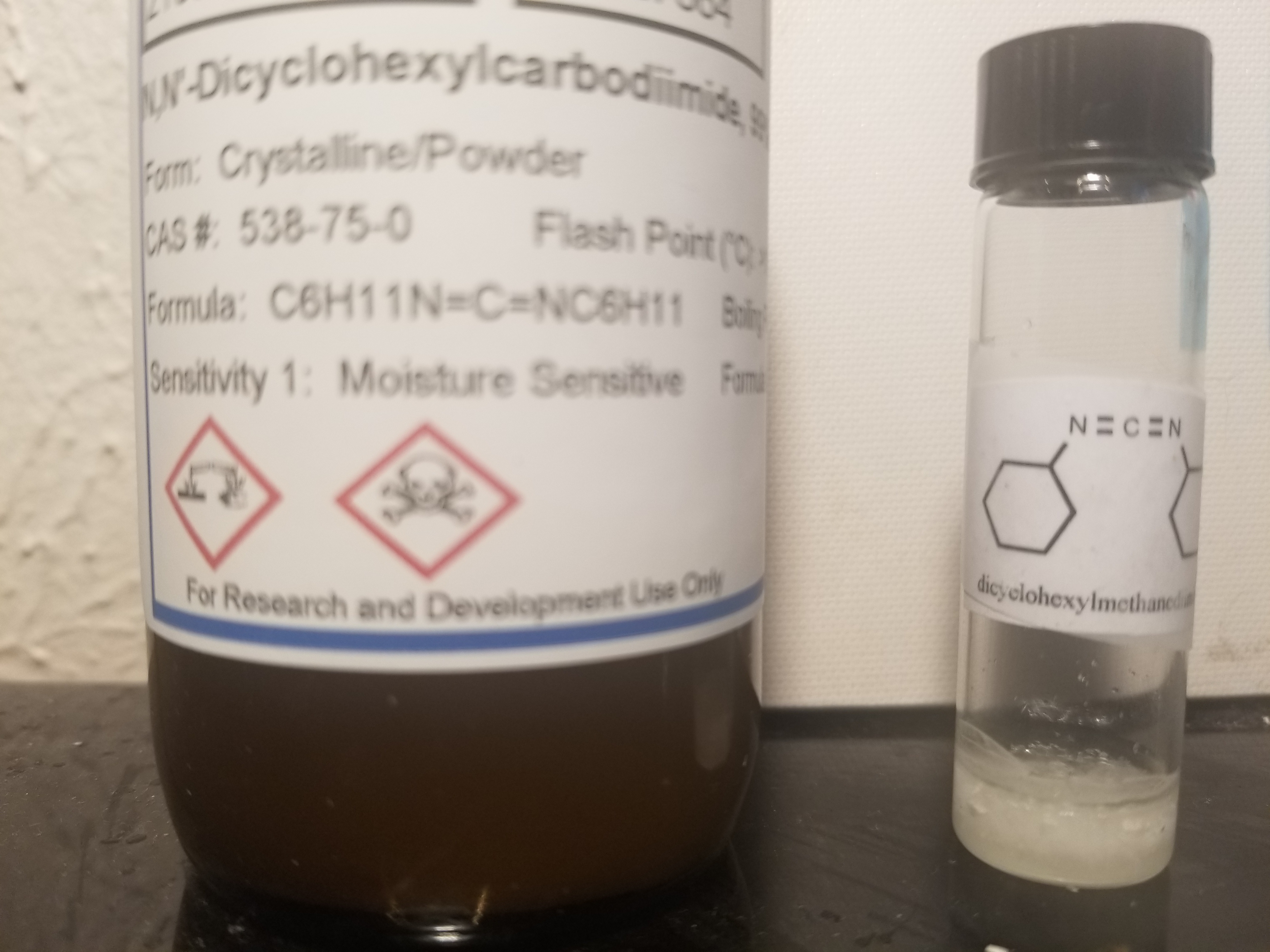

Names
- Preferred IUPAC name N,N′-Dicyclohexylmethanediimine
- Other names Dicyclohexylmethanediimine; N,N′-Dicyclohexylcarbodiimide; DCC, DCCD, DCCI

Identifiers
CAS Number	538-75-0
3D model (JSmol)	Interactive image
Beilstein Reference	610662
ChEBI	CHEBI:53090
ChEMBL	ChEMBL162598
ChemSpider	10408
ECHA InfoCard	100.007.914
EC Number	208-704-1
Gmelin Reference	51651
PubChem CID	10868
RTECS number	FF2160000
UNII	0T1427205E
UN number	2811
CompTox Dashboard (EPA)	DTXSID1023817
- InChI: InChI=1S/C13H22N2/c1-3-7-12(8-4-1)14-11-15-13-9-5-2-6-10-13/h12-13H,1-10H2 Key: QOSSAOTZNIDXMA-UHFFFAOYSA-N; InChI=1/C13H22N2/c1-3-7-12(8-4-1)14-11-15-13-9-5-2-6-10-13/h12-13H,1-10H2 Key: QOSSAOTZNIDXMA-UHFFFAOYAO
- SMILES: N(=C=N\C1CCCCC1)\C2CCCCC2

Properties
Chemical formula	C_{13}H_{22}N_{2}
Molar mass	206.333 g·mol^{−1}
Appearance	white crystalline powder
Odor	sweet
Density	0.95 g/cm^{3}, solid
Melting point	34 °C (93 °F; 307 K)
Boiling point	122 °C (252 °F; 395 K) (at 6 mmHg)
Solubility in water	not soluble

Hazards
- GHS labelling
Pictograms	(GHS05: Corrosive) (GHS06: Toxic) (GHS07: Exclamation mark)
Signal word	Danger
Hazard statements	H302, H311, H317, H318
Precautionary statements	P261, P264, P270, P272, P280, P301+P312, P302+P352, P305+P351+P338, P310, P312, P321, P322, P330, P333+P313, P361, P363, P405, P501
NFPA 704 (fire diamond)	3 1
Flash point	113 °C (235 °F; 386 K)

Related compounds
Related carbodiimides	DIC,EDC
- Except where otherwise noted, data are given for materials in their standard state (at 25 °C [77 °F], 100 kPa). verify (what is ?) Infobox references

N,N′-Dicyclohexylcarbodiimide (DCC or DCCD) is an organic compound with the chemical formula (C_{6}H_{11}N)_{2}C. It is a waxy white solid with a sweet odor. Its primary use is to couple amino acids during artificial peptide synthesis. The low melting point of this material allows it to be melted for easy handling. It is highly soluble in dichloromethane, tetrahydrofuran, acetonitrile and dimethylformamide, but insoluble in water.

== Structure and spectroscopy ==
The C−N=C=N−C core of carbodiimides (N=C=N) is linear, being related to the structure of allene. The molecule has idealized C_{2} symmetry.

The N=C=N moiety gives characteristic IR spectroscopic signature at 2117 cm^{−1}. The ^{15}N NMR spectrum shows a characteristic shift of 275 ppm upfield of nitric acid and the ^{13}C NMR spectrum features a peak at about 139 ppm downfield from TMS.

== Preparation ==
DCC is produced by the condensation and decarboxylation of cyclohexylisocyanate using various organophosphine catalysts:

2 C_{6}H_{11}NCO → (C_{6}H_{11}N)_{2}C + CO_{2}

=== Other methods ===
Of academic interest, palladium acetate, iodine, and oxygen can be used to couple cyclohexyl amine and cyclohexyl isocyanide. Yields of up to 67% have been achieved using this route:

C_{6}H_{11}NC + C_{6}H_{11}NH_{2} + O_{2} → (C_{6}H_{11}N)_{2}C + H_{2}O

DCC has also been prepared from dicyclohexylurea using a phase transfer catalyst. The disubstituted urea, toluenesulfonyl chloride, and potassium carbonate react in toluene in the presence of benzyl triethylammonium chloride to give DCC in 50% yield.

Phase transfer catalysis

== Reactions ==
=== Amide, peptide, and ester formation ===
DCC is a dehydrating agent for the preparation of amides, ketones, and nitriles. In these reactions, DCC hydrates to form dicyclohexylurea (DCU), a compound that is nearly insoluble in most organic solvents and insoluble in water. The majority of the DCU is thus readily removed by filtration, although the last traces can be difficult to eliminate from non-polar products. DCC can also be used to invert secondary alcohols. In the Steglich esterification, alcohols, including even some tertiary alcohols, can be esterified using a carboxylic acid in the presence of DCC and a catalytic amount of DMAP.

In protein synthesis (such as Fmoc solid-state synthesizers), the N-terminus is often used as the attachment site on which the amino acid monomers are added. To enhance the electrophilicity of carboxylate group, the negatively charged oxygen must first be "activated" into a better leaving group. DCC is used for this purpose. The negatively charged oxygen will act as a nucleophile, attacking the central carbon in DCC. DCC is temporarily attached to the former carboxylate group forming a highly electrophilic intermediate, making nucleophilic attack by the terminal amino group on the growing peptide more efficient.

=== Moffatt oxidation ===
In combination with dimethyl sulfoxide (DMSO), DCC affects the Pfitzner–Moffatt oxidation. This procedure is used for the oxidation of alcohols to aldehydes and ketones. Unlike metal-mediated oxidations, such as the Jones oxidation, the reaction conditions are sufficiently mild to avoid over-oxidation of aldehydes to carboxylic acids. Generally, three equivalents of DCC and 0.5 equivalents of proton source in DMSO are allowed to react overnight at room temperature. The reaction is quenched with acid.

=== Other reactions ===
- Reaction of an acid with hydrogen peroxide in presence of DCC leads to formation of peroxide linkage.
- Alcohols can also be dehydrated using DCC. This reaction proceeds by first giving the O-acylurea intermediate which is then hydrogenolyzed to produce the corresponding alkene:

RCHOHCH_{2}R′ + (C_{6}H_{11}N)_{2}C → RCH=CHR′ + (C_{6}H_{11}NH)_{2}CO

- Secondary alcohols can be stereochemically inverted by formation of a formyl ester followed by saponification. The secondary alcohol is mixed directly with DCC, formic acid, and a strong base such as sodium methoxide.
- In the presence of DMAP, DCC self-condenses two molecules of phenylacetic acid and its substituted derivatives to produce a bisbenzyl ketone.

== Biological action ==
DCC is a classical inhibitor of ATP synthase. DCC inhibits ATP synthase by binding to one of the c subunits and causing steric hindrance of the rotation of the F_{O} subunit.

== Safety ==
DCC often causes rashes. In vivo dermal sensitization studies according to OECD 429 confirmed DCC is a strong skin sensitizer, showing a response at 0.03 wt% in the Local Lymph Node Assay (LLNA) placing it in Globally Harmonized System of Classification and Labelling of Chemicals (GHS) Dermal Sensitization Category 1A. Thermal hazard analysis by differential scanning calorimetry (DSC) shows DCC poses minimal explosion risks.

== See also ==
- Carbodiimide
