= C5H4N4O =

The molecular formula C_{5}H_{4}N_{4}O (molar mass: 136.11 g/mol, exact mass: 136.0385 u) may refer to:

- Allopurinol
- 1-Hydroxy-7-azabenzotriazole (HOAt)
- Hypoxanthine
