= PyAOP reagent =

Names
- IUPAC name (7-Azabenzotriazol-1-yloxy)tripyrrolidinophosphonium hexafluorophosphate
- Other names PyAOP

Identifiers
CAS Number	156311-83-0
3D model (JSmol)	Interactive image
ChemSpider	9213814
ECHA InfoCard	100.155.575
PubChem CID	11038641
UNII	C5Z532MU8E
CompTox Dashboard (EPA)	DTXSID00935424
- InChI: InChI=1S/C17H27N7OP.F6P/c1-2-11-21(10-1)26(22-12-3-4-13-22,23-14-5-6-15-23)25-24-17-16(19-20-24)8-7-9-18-17;1-7(2,3,4,5)6/h7-9H,1-6,10-15H2;/q+1;-1 Key: CBZAHNDHLWAZQC-UHFFFAOYSA-N
- SMILES: C1CCN(C1)[P+](N2CCCC2)(N3CCCC3)ON4C5=C(C=CC=N5)N=N4.F[P-](F)(F)(F)(F)F

Properties
Chemical formula	C_{17}H_{27}F_{6}N_{7}OP_{2}
Molar mass	521.389 g·mol^{−1}
Appearance	White crystals
Melting point	163–168 °C (325–334 °F; 436–441 K)

Hazards
- Occupational safety and health (OHS/OSH)
Main hazards	Irritant
- Except where otherwise noted, data are given for materials in their standard state (at 25 °C [77 °F], 100 kPa). Infobox references

PyAOP ((7-azabenzotriazol-1-yloxy)tripyrrolidinophosphonium hexafluorophosphate) is a reagent used to prepare amides from carboxylic acids and amines in the context of peptide synthesis. It can be prepared from 1-hydroxy-7-azabenzotriazole (HOAt) and a chlorophosphonium reagent under basic conditions. It is a derivative of the HOAt family of amide bond forming reagents. It is preferred over HATU, because it does not engage in side reactions with the N-terminus of the peptide. Compared to the HOBt-containing analog PyBOP, PyAOP is more reactive due to the additional nitrogen in the fused pyridine ring of the HOAt moiety. Thermal hazard analysis by differential scanning calorimetry (DSC) shows PyAOP is potentially explosive.

== See also ==
- BOP reagent
