= 1-Ethyl-3-(3-dimethylaminopropyl)carbodiimide =

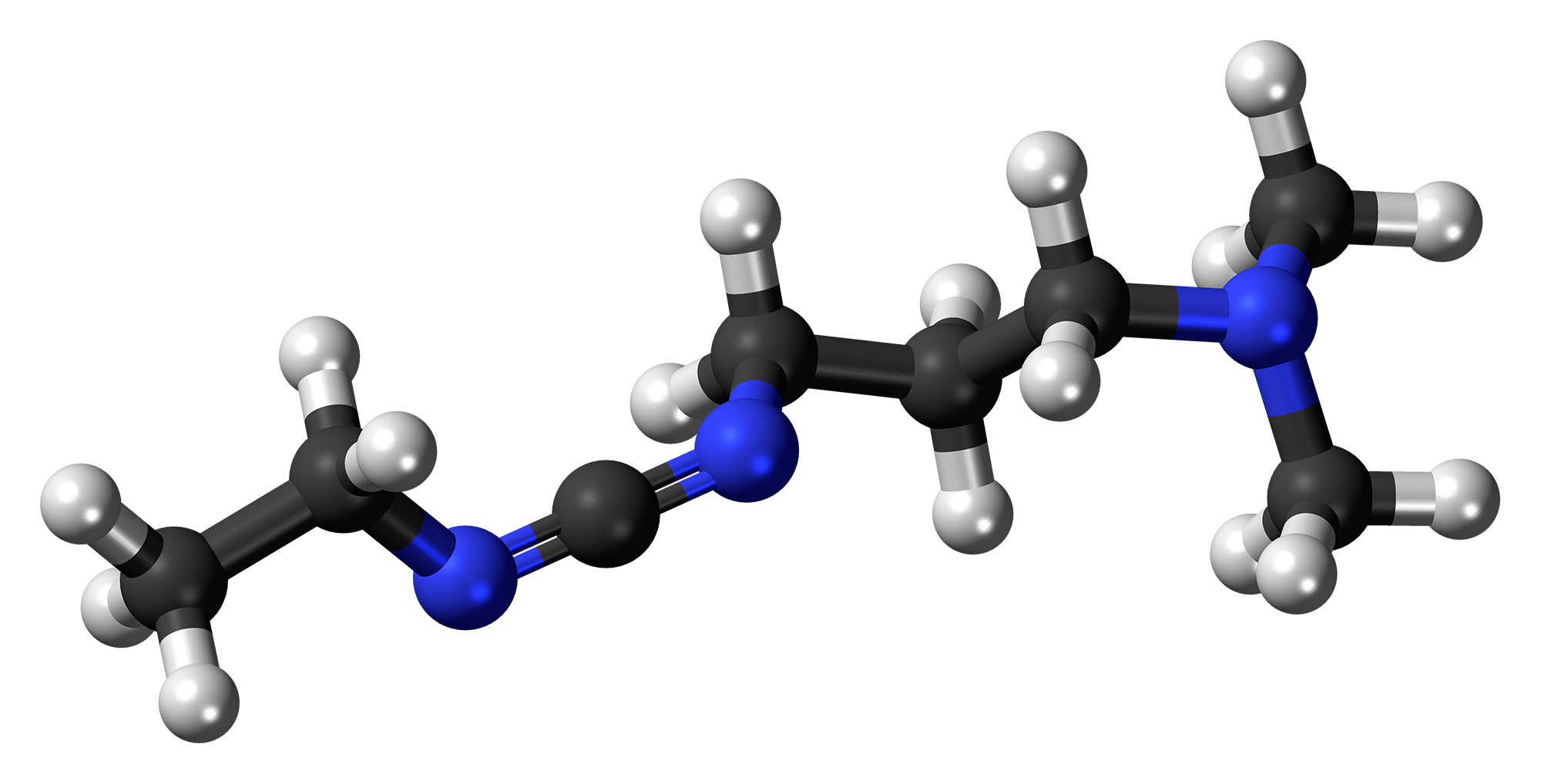

Names
- Preferred IUPAC name 3-{[(Ethylimino)methylidene]amino}-N,N-dimethylpropan-1-amine

Identifiers
| CAS Number | 1892-57-5; 25952-53-8 (hydrochloride) |
| 3D model (JSmol) | Interactive image |
| ChemSpider | 15119 |
| ECHA InfoCard | 100.015.982 |
| PubChem CID | 15908 |
| UNII | RJ5OZG6I4A; 19W5TL0WJ4 (hydrochloride) |
| CompTox Dashboard (EPA) | DTXSID60865258 |
- InChI: InChI=1S/C8H17N3/c1-4-9-8-10-6-5-7-11(2)3/h4-7H2,1-3H3 Key: LMDZBCPBFSXMTL-UHFFFAOYSA-N; InChI=1/C8H17N3/c1-4-9-8-10-6-5-7-11(2)3/h4-7H2,1-3H3 Key: LMDZBCPBFSXMTL-UHFFFAOYAH
- SMILES: CCN=C=NCCCN(C)C

Properties
| Chemical formula | C_{8}H_{17}N_{3} |
| Molar mass | 155.245 g·mol^{−1} |
| Appearance | Colorless oil (freebase); White solid (hydrochloride) |
| Melting point | 112 °C (234 °F; 385 K) (hydrochloride) |
| Solubility in water | soluble |
| Solubility | soluble in DCM, DMF, and THF |

Hazards
| Safety data sheet (SDS) | External MSDS (HCl Salt) |
- Except where otherwise noted, data are given for materials in their standard state (at 25 °C [77 °F], 100 kPa). verify (what is ?) Infobox references

1-Ethyl-3-(3-dimethylaminopropyl)carbodiimide (EDC, EDAC or EDCI) is a water-soluble carbodiimide usually handled as the hydrochloride, which is a white solid.

It is typically employed in the 4.0-6.0 pH range. It is generally used as a carboxyl activating agent for the coupling of primary amines to yield amide bonds. While other carbodiimides like dicyclohexylcarbodiimide (DCC) or diisopropylcarbodiimide (DIC) are also employed for this purpose, EDC has the advantage that the urea byproduct formed (often challenging to remove in the case of DCC or DIC) can be washed away from the amide product using dilute acid. Additionally, EDC can also be used to activate phosphate groups in order to form phosphomonoesters and phosphodiesters. Common uses for this carbodiimide include peptide synthesis, protein crosslinking to nucleic acids, but also in the preparation of immunoconjugates. EDC is often used in combination with N-hydroxysuccinimide (NHS) for the immobilisation of large biomolecules. Recent work has also used EDC to assess the structure state of uracil nucleobases in RNA.

== Preparation ==
EDC is commercially available. It may be prepared by coupling ethyl isocyanate to N,N-dimethylpropane-1,3-diamine to give a urea, followed by a dehydration reaction mediated by TsCl and TEA:

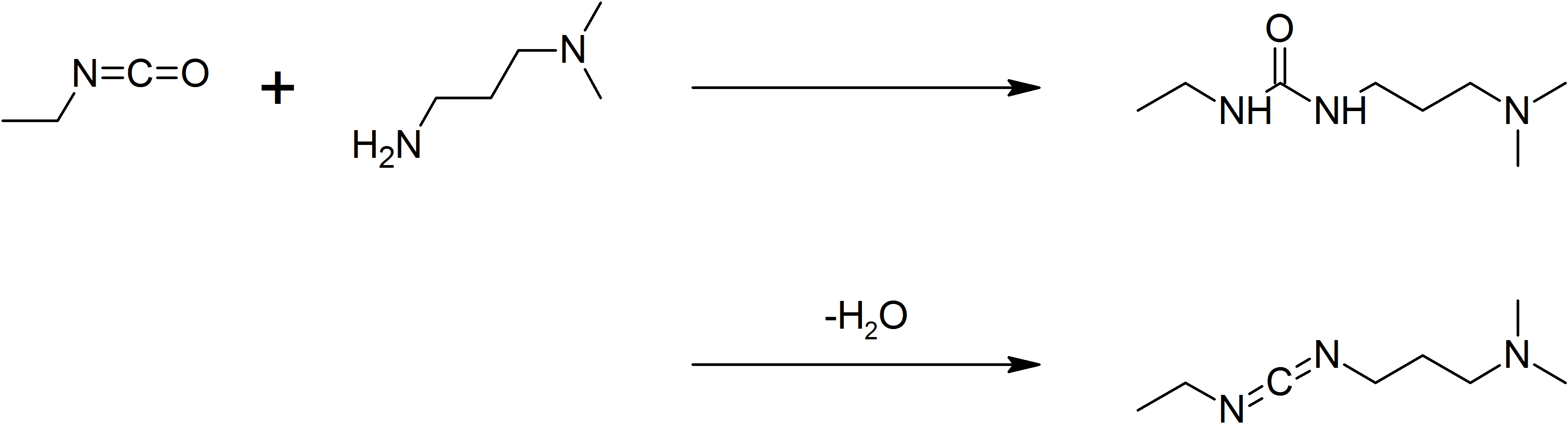

== Mechanism ==
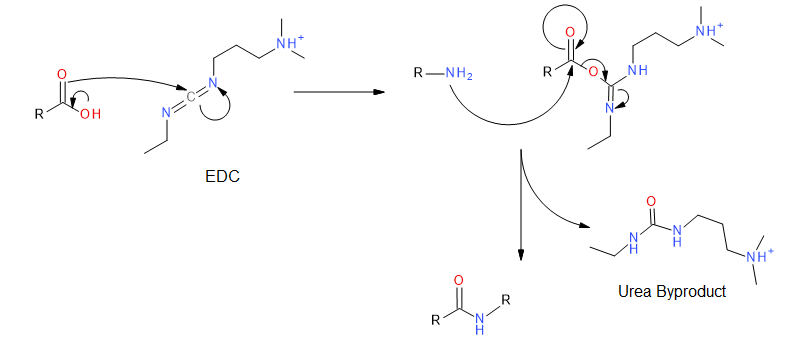
The scheme above shows the general mechanistic steps for EDC-mediated coupling of carboxylic acids and amines under acidic conditions. The tetrahedral intermediate and the aminolysis steps are not shown explicitly.

EDC couples primary amines, and other nucleophiles, to carboxylic acids by creating an activated ester leaving group. First, the carbonyl of the acid attacks the carbodiimide of EDC, and there is a subsequent proton transfer. The primary amine then attacks the carbonyl carbon of the acid which forms a tetrahedral intermediate before collapsing and discharging the urea byproduct. The desired amide is obtained.

== Safety ==
In vivo dermal sensitization studies according to OECD 429 confirmed EDC is a strong skin sensitizer, showing a response at <0.01 wt% in the Local Lymph Node Assay (LLNA) placing it in Globally Harmonized System of Classification and Labelling of Chemicals (GHS) Dermal Sensitization Category 1A. Thermal hazard analysis by differential scanning calorimetry (DSC) shows EDC poses minimal explosion risks.
