= C13H24N2O =

The molecular formula C_{13}H_{24}N_{2}O (molar mass: 224.34 g/mol, exact mass: 224.1889 u) may refer to:

- Cuscohygrine
- Dicyclohexylurea
