= HOAt (disambiguation) =

HOAt is 1-Hydroxy-7-azabenzotriazole, a reagent used in organic chemistry.

HOAt or HOAT may also refer to:

- Hypoastatous acid (chemical formula HOAt)
- Hybrid organic acid technology, a specific composition of antifreeze
