= Linker (peptide synthesis) =

Peptide synthesis molecule

Principle of solid phase peptide synthesis. The yellow spheres symbolize solid phase beads. Shown on the left is a bead carrying a Rink amide linker. On the right, an amino acid has been coupled to the amine group of the linker.

In solid phase peptide synthesis, a linker is a molecule that connects the solid phase (a beaded resin support) to the growing peptide chain. The linker is often permanently attached to the solid phase, but carries a transient covalent bond to the peptide (typically its C-terminus) that can be cleaved after completion of the synthesis to release the peptide. Cleavage can take place under various conditions depending on the linker type and result in different C-terminal functionalities of the released peptide, e.g. amides, carboxylic acids, esters, lactams, etc. Linkers that do not attach via the C-terminus do also exist.

== Examples ==
Linker	First reported use	C-Terminal outcome	Protecting group chemistry	Stability to deprotection conditions	Typical cleavage conditions
Merrifield	1963	Carboxylic acid	Boc	Unstable in neat TFA	Anhydrous HF
Rink Amide	1987	Amide	Fmoc	Stable to 20% piperidine	95% TFA in dichloromethane
Wang	1973	Carboxylic acid	Fmoc	Stable to 20% piperidine	50-95% TFA in dichloromethane
Sieber	1987	Amide	Fmoc	Stable to 20% piperidine	1-5% TFA in dichloromethane
4-(Hydroxymethyl)benzoic acid	1981	Carboxylic acid, amide, ester, lactam, etc. (depends on cleavage conditions)	Fmoc	Stable to 20% piperidine (diketopiperazine formation risk after deprotection of 2^{nd} amino acid)	Nucleophilic base
o-Nitrobenzyl	1975	Amide	Fmoc	Stable to TFA and 20% piperidine	UV light
