= BOC =

BOC is the abbreviation of:

- Battle of Chancellorsville, during the American Civil War
- Biology of the Cell, an academic journal in biology
- Blackbird Owners Club, a motorclub for people who own a Honda CBR1100XX Super Blackbird and/or Honda X-11
- Bloque Obrero y Campesino (Spanish: "Workers and Peasants' Bloc"), a former leftwing group in Spain, associated with the international Right Opposition, extant from 1931 to 1935
- BOC (gene), human gene
- BOC Challenge, now renamed the Velux 5 Oceans Race, a round-the-world single-handed sailing yacht race named - from 1982 to 1995 - after its then main sponsor BOC Limited
- Body of Christ, a term in Christian theology with two separate connotations
- Bottom of container, a parachute deployment system
- British Overseas citizen, one kind of British nationality
- tert-Butoxycarbonyl, abbreviated as "Boc", "BOC" or "t-Boc", a protecting group used in organic chemistry

Banks:

- Bank of Canada, Canada's central bank
- Bank of Ceylon, a major government-owned commercial bank in Sri Lanka
- Bank of China, a major state-owned bank in the People's Republic of China
- Bank of Cyprus, a major Cypriot financial institution

Companies:

- Bell Operating Company, any one of the 24 local telephone companies that AT&T either owned or had a stake in prior to January 1, 1984
- Board of Certification, Inc., a corporation that issues certifications for entry-level Athletic Trainers
- BOC (company), British based industrial gas company, known as Brin's Oxygen Company prior to 1906, and the British Oxygen Company prior to 1975

Film:

- Bride of Chucky

Music:

- Baltimore Opera Company, an opera company in Baltimore, Maryland, United States
- Blue Öyster Cult, an American psychedelic/heavy metal band
- Boards of Canada, a Scottish electronic music duo
- Boston Opera Company, an opera company in Boston, Massachusetts
- Bump of Chicken, a Japanese rock band

Names:

- Emil Boc (born 1966), Romanian politician

Organizations:

- Baystate Organic Certifiers, which is an organic-certifying agent owned by Massachusetts Independent Certification, Inc. (MICI) and accredited by National Organic Program (NOP)
- Bird Observation & Conservation Australia, an Australian birding association
- British Ornithologists' Club, aims to promote discussion between members and others interested in ornithology, and to facilitate the dissemination of scientific information concerned with ornithology
- British Orthodox Church, an autocephalos Oriental Orthodox church, formerly under the Coptic Orthodox Patriarchate of Alexandria
- Bulgarian Olympic Committee, the National Olympic Committee of Bulgaria, part of the International Olympic Committee
- Bulgarian Orthodox Church, an autocephalous Eastern Orthodox church with adherents in the Republic of Bulgaria and worldwide
- Bureau of Customs, a Philippine government agency under the Department of Finance

Places:

- Bay of Campeche, a bay in southwestern Gulf of Mexico
- Boca Raton, Florida
  - Boca Raton station (Brightline)

Technology:

- Binary offset carrier modulation - a digital modulation employed in Galileo and modernized GPS systems

Television:

- Beyond Our Control, an American television series
