= Triisopropylsilane =

Names
- Preferred IUPAC name Tri(propan-2-yl)silane
- Other names TIS or TIPS

Identifiers
CAS Number	6485-79-6
3D model (JSmol)	Interactive image
ChemSpider	122362
ECHA InfoCard	100.104.805
EC Number	464-880-1
PubChem CID	6327611
CompTox Dashboard (EPA)	DTXSID90983439
- InChI: InChI=1S/C9H21Si/c1-7(2)10(8(3)4)9(5)6/h7-9H,1-6H3 Key: ZGYICYBLPGRURT-UHFFFAOYSA-N
- SMILES: CC(C)[Si](C(C)C)C(C)C

Properties
Chemical formula	C_{9}H_{22}Si
Molar mass	158.360 g·mol^{−1}
Density	0.773 g/mL
Boiling point	166 °C (331 °F; 439 K)

Hazards
- GHS labelling
Pictograms	(GHS02: Flammable) (GHS07: Exclamation mark)
Signal word	Warning
Hazard statements	H226, H315, H317, H319, H335
Precautionary statements	P210, P233, P240, P241, P242, P243, P261, P264, P271, P272, P280, P302+P352, P303+P361+P353, P304+P340, P305+P351+P338, P312, P321, P332+P313, P333+P313, P337+P313, P362, P363, P370+P378, P403+P233, P403+P235, P405, P501
Flash point	35 °C
- Except where otherwise noted, data are given for materials in their standard state (at 25 °C [77 °F], 100 kPa). Infobox references

Triisopropyl silane (TIPS) is an organosilicon compound with the formula (i-Pr)_{3}SiH (i-Pr = isopropyl). This colorless liquid is used as a scavenger in peptide synthesis. It can also act as a mild reducing agent.

In peptide synthesis, TIPS is used as a scavenger for peptide groups being removed from the peptide sequence at the global deprotection. TIPS is able to scavenge carbocations formed in the deprotection of a peptide as it can act as a hydride donor in acidic conditions. Silanes may be preferred as scavengers in place of sulfur-based scavengers.
