= HATU =

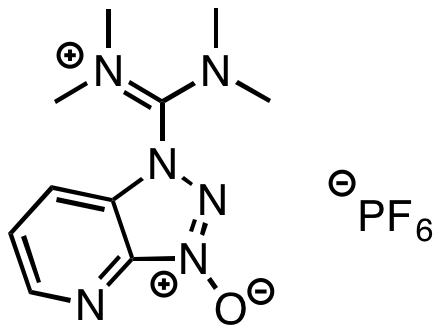

Names
- IUPAC name O-(7-azabenzotriazol-1-yl)-N,N,N′,N′-tetramethyluronium hexafluorophosphate
- Other names: 1-[Bis(dimethylamino)methylene]-1H-1,2,3-triazolo[4,5-b]pyridinium 3-oxid hexafluorophosphate; N-[(Dimethylamino)-1H-1,2,3-triazolo-[4,5-b]pyridin-1-ylmethylene]-N-methylmethanaminium hexafluorophosphate N-oxide

Identifiers
CAS Number	148893-10-1
3D model (JSmol)	Interactive image
ChemSpider	8061830
ECHA InfoCard	100.103.434
PubChem CID	9886157
UNII	B93RIH1T7E
CompTox Dashboard (EPA)	DTXSID201026946 DTXSID30933498, DTXSID201026946
- InChI: InChI=1S/C10H15N6O.F6P/c1-14(2)10(15(3)4)17-16-9-8(12-13-16)6-5-7-11-9;1-7(2,3,4,5)6/h5-7H,1-4H3;/q+1;-1 Key: JNWBBCNCSMBKNE-UHFFFAOYSA-N; InChI=1/C10H15N6O.F6P/c1-14(2)10(15(3)4)17-16-9-8(12-13-16)6-5-7-11-9;1-7(2,3,4,5)6/h5-7H,1-4H3;/q+1;-1 Key: JNWBBCNCSMBKNE-UHFFFAOYAG
- SMILES: CN(C)C(=[N+](C)C)On1c2c(cccn2)nn1.F[P-](F)(F)(F)(F)F

Properties
Chemical formula	C_{10}H_{15}F_{6}N_{6}OP
Molar mass	380.235 g·mol^{−1}
Appearance	White crystalline solid
Melting point	183–185 °C (361–365 °F; 456–458 K)

Hazards
- GHS labelling
Pictograms	(GHS07: Exclamation mark) (GHS02: Flammable)
Signal word	Danger
Hazard statements	H228, H303+H313, H315, H319, H335
Precautionary statements	P210, P240, P241, P261, P264, P271, P280, P302+P352, P304+P340, P305+P351+P338, P312, P332+P313, P337+P313, P362, P370+P378, P403+P233, P405, P501
NFPA 704 (fire diamond)	2 3 3
- Except where otherwise noted, data are given for materials in their standard state (at 25 °C [77 °F], 100 kPa). Infobox references

HATU (Hexafluorophosphate Azabenzotriazole Tetramethyl Uronium) is a reagent used in peptide coupling chemistry to generate an active ester from a carboxylic acid. HATU is used along with Hünig's base (N,N-diisopropylethylamine), or triethylamine to form amide bonds. Typically dimethylformamide is used as solvent, although other polar aprotic solvents can also be used.

== History ==
HATU was first reported by Louis A. Carpino in 1993 as an efficient means of preparing active esters derived from 1-hydroxy-7-azabenzotriazole (HOAt). HATU is commonly prepared from HOAt and TCFH under basic conditions and can exist as either the uronium salt (O-form) or the less reactive iminium salt (N-form). HATU was initially reported as the O-form using the original preparation reported by Carpino; however, X-ray crystallographic and NMR studies revealed the true structure of HATU to be the less reactive guanidinium isomer. It is, however, possible to obtain the uronium isomer by preparing HATU using KOAt in place of HOAt and working up the reaction mixture quickly to prevent isomerisation.

== Reactions ==
HATU is commonly encountered in amine acylation reactions (i.e., amide formation). Such reactions are typically performed in two distinct reaction steps: (1) reaction of a carboxylic acid with HATU to form the OAt-active ester; then (2) addition of the nucleophile (amine) to the active ester solution to afford the acylated product.

The reaction mechanism of carboxylic acid activation by HATU and subsequent N-acylation is summarised in the figure below. The mechanism is shown using the more commonly encountered and commercially available iminium isomer; a similar mechanism, however, is likely to apply to the uronium form. In the first step, the carboxylate anion (formed by deprotonation by an organic base [not shown]) attacks HATU to form the unstable O-acyl(tetramethyl)isouronium salt. The OAt anion rapidly attacks the isouronium salt, affording the OAt-active ester and liberating a stoichiometric quantity of tetramethylurea. Addition of a nucleophile, such as an amine, to the OAt-active ester results in acylation.

The high coupling efficiencies and fast reaction rates associated with HATU coupling are thought to arise from a neighbouring group effect brought about by the pyridine nitrogen atom, which stabilises the incoming amine through a hydrogen-bonded 7-membered cyclic transition state.

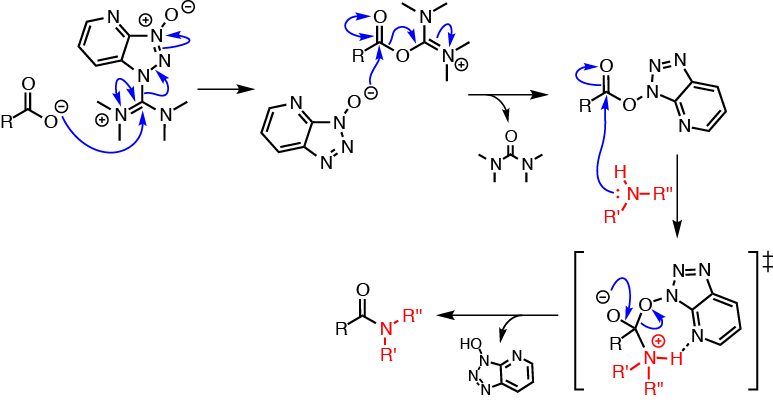
Mechanism of N-acylation using HATU

Because of the extraordinary coupling efficiency of HATU, it has often been used for intramolecular amidation (coupling of a carboxylic acid and an amine of the same molecule). For example, the formation of cyclo-tetrapeptides through the head-to-tail reaction of linear tetrapeptides assisted by HATU has been reported.

== Safety ==
HATU has been shown to induce allergic reactions. In vivo dermal sensitization studies according to OECD 429 confirmed HATU is a moderate skin sensitizer, showing a response at 1.2 wt% in the Local Lymph Node Assay (LLNA) placing it in Globally Harmonized System of Classification and Labelling of Chemicals (GHS) Dermal Sensitization Category 1A. Thermal hazard analysis by Differential scanning calorimetry (DSC) shows HATU is potentially explosive.
