= TCFH =

Names
- IUPAC name [chloro(dimethylamino)methylidene]-dimethylazanium hexafluorophosphate
- Other names: N,N,N’,N’-Tetramethylchloroformamidinium hexafluorophosphate; Chloro-N,N,N’,N’-tetramethylformamidinium hexafluorophosphate

Identifiers
CAS Number	94790-35-9; 207915-99-9 (deleted)
3D model (JSmol)	Interactive image
ChemSpider	9164834
ECHA InfoCard	100.205.048
EC Number	627-919-5
PubChem CID	10989639
CompTox Dashboard (EPA)	DTXSID50451023
- InChI: InChI=1S/C5H12ClN2.F6P/c1-7(2)5(6)8(3)4;1-7(2,3,4,5)6/h1-4H3;/q+1;-1 Key: CUKNPSDEURGZCO-UHFFFAOYSA-N
- SMILES: F[P-](F)(F)(F)(F)F.CN(C)C(Cl)=[N+](C)C

Properties
Chemical formula	C_{5}H_{12}ClF_{6}N_{2}P
Molar mass	280.58 g·mol^{−1}
Appearance	White crystalline solid
Melting point	100–101 °C (212–214 °F; 373–374 K)

Hazards
- GHS labelling
Pictograms	(GHS07: Exclamation mark)
Signal word	Warning
Hazard statements	H302, H315, H319, H335
Precautionary statements	P261, P301+P312, P302+P352, P304+P340, P305+P351+P338
Safety data sheet (SDS)	Oakwood
- Except where otherwise noted, data are given for materials in their standard state (at 25 °C [77 °F], 100 kPa). Infobox references

TCFH (N,N,N’,N’-tetramethylchloroformamidinium hexafluorophosphate) is an electrophilic amidine reagent used to activate a number of functional groups (such as carboxylic acids) for reaction with nucleophilies. TCFH is most commonly used to activate carboxylic acids for reaction with amines in the context of amide bond formation and peptide synthesis.

== Preparation ==
TCFH is commercially available. It may be prepared from tetramethylurea using a chlorinating agent such as oxalyl chloride, thionyl chloride or phosphorus oxychloride followed by a salt metathesis reaction.

== Uses ==
TCFH itself is a common reagent used in the preparation of uronium and guanidinium salts used for amide bond formation and peptide synthesis, such as HATU.

Amide bond formation with TCFH can be performed in a wide range of organic solvents, most commonly acetonitrile, but also water and in the solid state. Reactions typically require an added Brønsted base, and a wide range can be employed including N,N-diisopropylethylamine (DIPEA). In reactions of carboxylic acids with TCFH and a weakly Lewis basic amine like DIPEA, formation of an acid chloride or anhydride as the active acylating agent occurs. Use of N-methylimidazole (NMI) as a base, with both Brønsted and Lewis basic properties, provides some unique advantages. Reactions of carboxylic acids with TCFH and a strongly Lewis basic amine like NMI lead to in situ formation of an N-acyl imidazolium ion (NAI) as the active acylating agent.

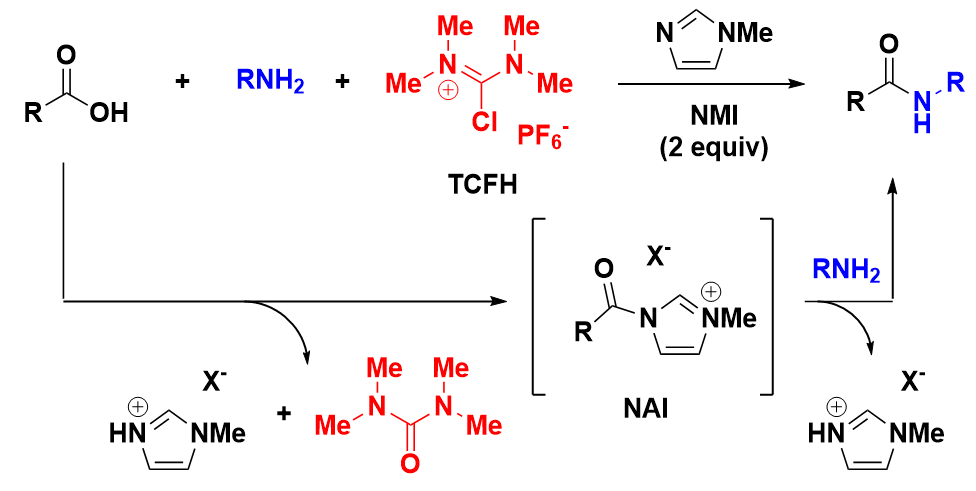
TCFH Mechanism

These strongly electrophilic NAIs allow for reactions with a wide range of nitrogen nucleophiles, including hindered and electron-deficient amines. An added benefit of the use of NMI as the base, due to its low pK_{a}(H_{2}O) of 7, is that the epimerization of labile stereogenic centers is minimized. The reaction by-products have high water solubility, facilitating reaction workup and isolation.

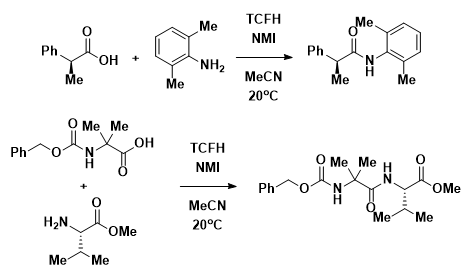

TCFH can also be used in other reactions involving activation of carboxylic acids from reactions with oxygen-, sulfur- and carbon-nucleophiles for the preparation of esters, thioesters and ketones. Extending beyond reactions with carboxylic acids, TCFH has been shown to be an activator for other oxygen centered nucleophiles, including heterocyclic alcohols, ketooximes, and even alcohols. Reactivity with sulfur centered nucleophiles like thioureas has also been demonstrated.

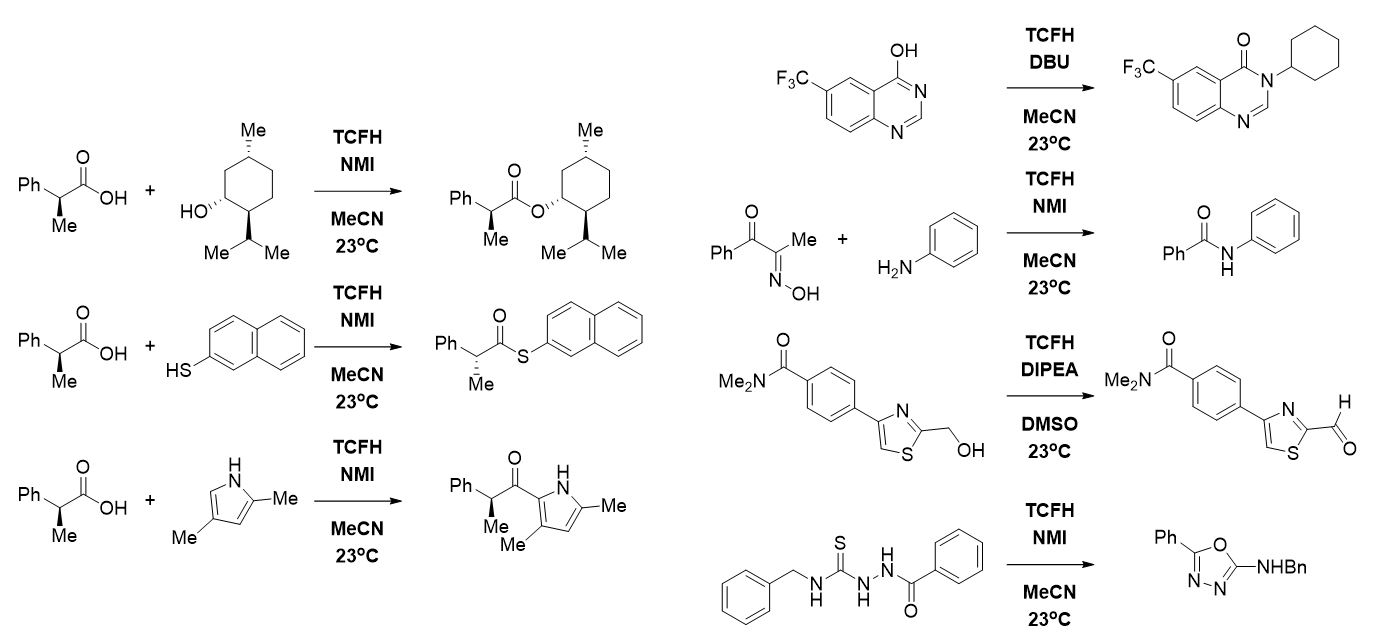
Uses of TCFH

== Safety ==
TCFH does not irritate skin but is a potent eye irritant. The sensitization potential of TCFH was shown to be low compared to other amide bond forming agents, which can be used in the context of peptide synthesis (it is non-sensitizing at 1% in the local lymph node assay according to OECD 429). The major by-product of using TCFH is tetramethylurea, which has demonstrated teratogenic activity in several laboratory animal species.
