= Carbodiimide =

Class of organic compounds with general structure RN=C=NR'

General structure of trans-carbodiimides: The core functional group is shown in blue with attached R groups

In organic chemistry, a carbodiimide (systematic IUPAC name: methanediimine) is a functional group with the formula RN=C=NR. On Earth they are exclusively synthetic, but in interstellar space the parent compound HN=C=NH has been detected by its maser emissions.

A well known carbodiimide is dicyclohexylcarbodiimide, which is used in peptide synthesis. Dialkylcarbodiimides are stable. Some diaryl derivatives tend to convert to dimers and polymers upon standing at room temperature, though this mostly occurs with low melting point carbodiimides that are liquids at room temperature. Solid diaryl carbodiimides are more stable, but can slowly undergo hydrolysis in the presence of water over time.

== Structure and bonding ==
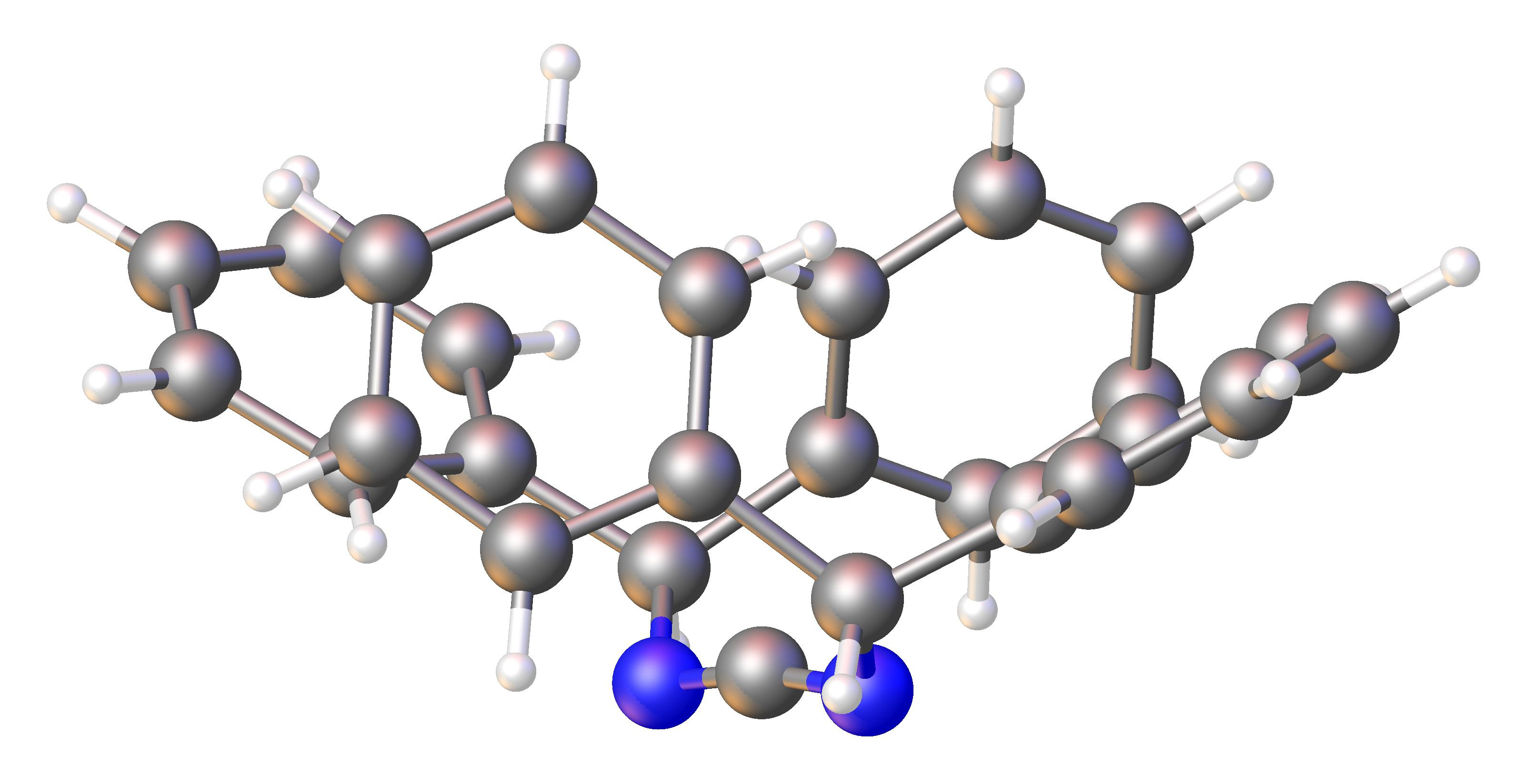
Structure of C(NCHPh_{2})_{2} as determined by X-ray crystallography (color scheme: gray = C, blue = N)

From the perspective of bonding, carbodiimides are isoelectronic with carbon dioxide. Three principal resonance structures describe carbodiimides:

RN=C=NR ↔ RN^{+}≡C-N^{−}R ↔ RN^{−}-C≡N^{+}R

The N=C=N core is relatively linear and the C-N=C angles approach 120°. In the case of C(NCHPh_{2})_{2}, the central N=C=N angle is 170° and the C-N=C angles are within 1° of 126°. The C=N distances are short, nearly 120 pm, as is characteristic of double bonds. Carbodiimides are chiral, possessing C_{2}-symmetry and therefore axial chirality. However, due to the low energy barrier to the molecule rotating and thereby converting quickly between its isomers, the actual isolation of one optical isomer of a carbodiimide is extremely difficult. It has been demonstrated at least once, in the case of conformationally restricted cyclic carbodiimides; though there are other reports of one-handed axially chiral carbodiimides, their validity has since been called into question on experimental and computational grounds.

The parent compound, methanediimine, (HN=C=NH), is a tautomer of cyanamide.

== Synthesis ==
=== From thioureas and ureas ===
A classic route to carbodiimides involves dehydrosulfurization of thioureas. A typical reagent for this process is phosgene or mercuric oxide:

(R(H)N)_{2}CS + HgO → (RN)_{2}C + HgS + H_{2}O

This reaction can often be conducted as stated, even though carbodiimides react with water. In some cases, a dehydrating agent is added to the reaction mixture.

The dehydration of N,N'-dialkylureas gives carbodiimides:

(R(H)N)_{2}CO → (RN)_{2}C + H_{2}O

Phosphorus pentoxide and p-Toluenesulfonyl chloride have been used as a dehydrating agents.

=== From isocyanates ===
Isocyanates can be converted to carbodiimides with loss of carbon dioxide:

2 RN=C=O → (RN)_{2}C + CO_{2}

The reaction is catalyzed by organophosphines. This reaction is reversible.

== Reactions ==
Compared to other heteroallenes, carbodiimides are very weak electrophiles and only react with nucleophiles in the presence of catalysts, such as acids. In this way, guanidines can be prepared. As weak bases, carbodiimides bind to Lewis acids to give adducts.

=== Moffatt oxidation ===
Carbodiimides are reagents for the Moffatt oxidation, a protocol for conversion of an alcohol to a carbonyl (ketone or aldehyde) using dimethyl sulfoxide as the oxidizing agent:

(CH_{3})_{2}SO + (CyN)_{2}C + R_{2}CHOH → (CH_{3})_{2}S + (CyNH)_{2}CO + R_{2}C=O

Typically the sulfoxide and diimide are used in excess. The reaction generates dimethyl sulfide and a urea as byproducts.

=== Coupling agents ===
In organic synthesis, compounds containing the carbodiimide functionality are used as dehydration agents. Specifically they are often used to convert carboxylic acids to amides or esters. Additives, such as N-hydroxybenzotriazole or N-hydroxysuccinimide, are often added to increase yields and decrease side reactions.

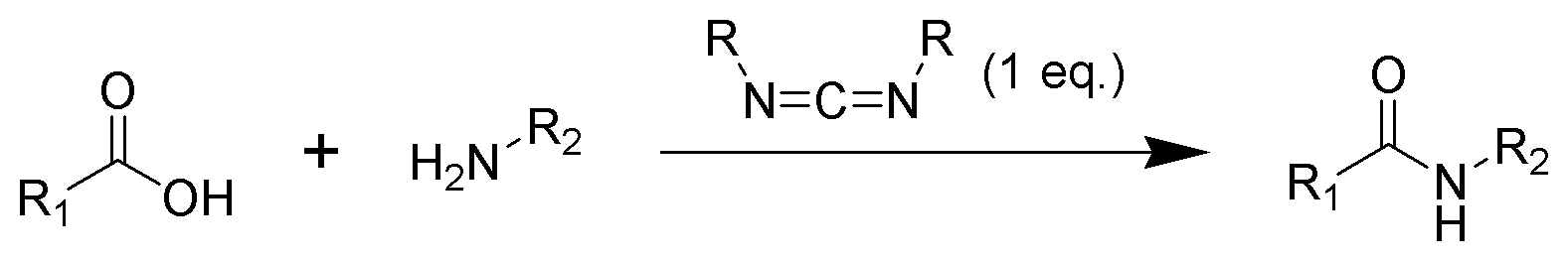
Amide coupling utilizing a carbodiimide

Polycarbodiimides can also be used as crosslinkers for aqueous resins, such as polyurethane dispersions or acrylic dispersion. Here the polycarbodiimide reacts with carboxylic acids, whose functional groups are often present in such aqueous resins, to form N-acyl urea. The result is the formation of covalent bonds between the polymer chains, making them crosslinked.

==== Amide formation pathway ====
The formation of an amide using a carbodiimide is a common reaction, but carries the risk of several side reactions. The acid 1 will react with the carbodiimide to produce the key intermediate: the O-acylisourea 2, which can be viewed as a carboxylic ester with an activated leaving group. The O-acylisourea will react with amines to give the desired amide 3 and urea 4.

The possible reactions of the O-acylisourea 2 produce both desired and undesired products. The O-acylisourea 2 can react with an additional carboxylic acid 1 to give an acid anhydride 5, which can react further to give the amide 3. The main undesired reaction pathway involves the rearrangement of the O-acylisourea 2 to the stable N-acylurea 6. The use of solvents with low dielectric constants such as dichloromethane or chloroform can minimize this side reaction.

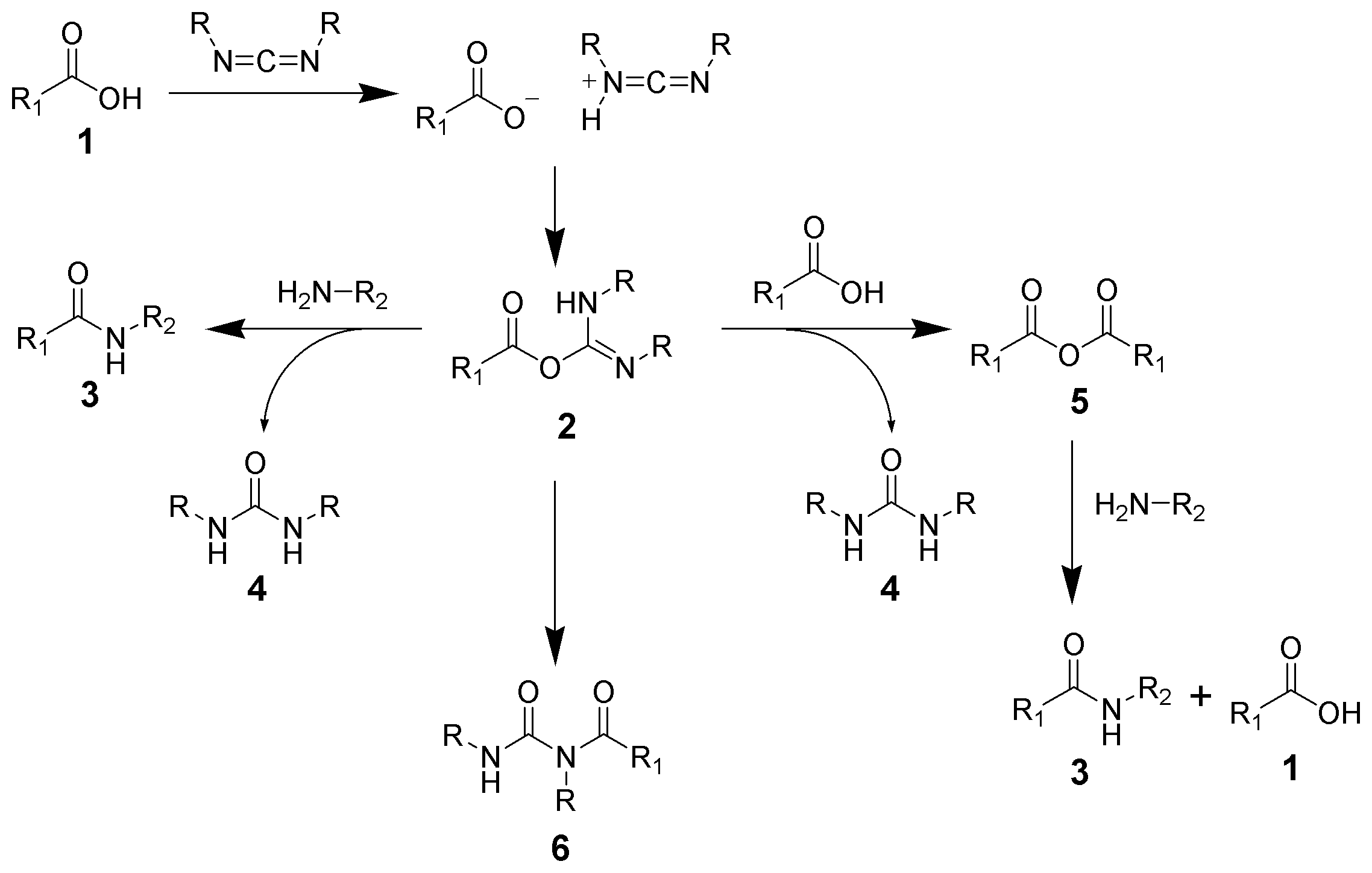
The reaction mechanism of amide formation using a carbodiimide

== Examples ==
=== DCC ===
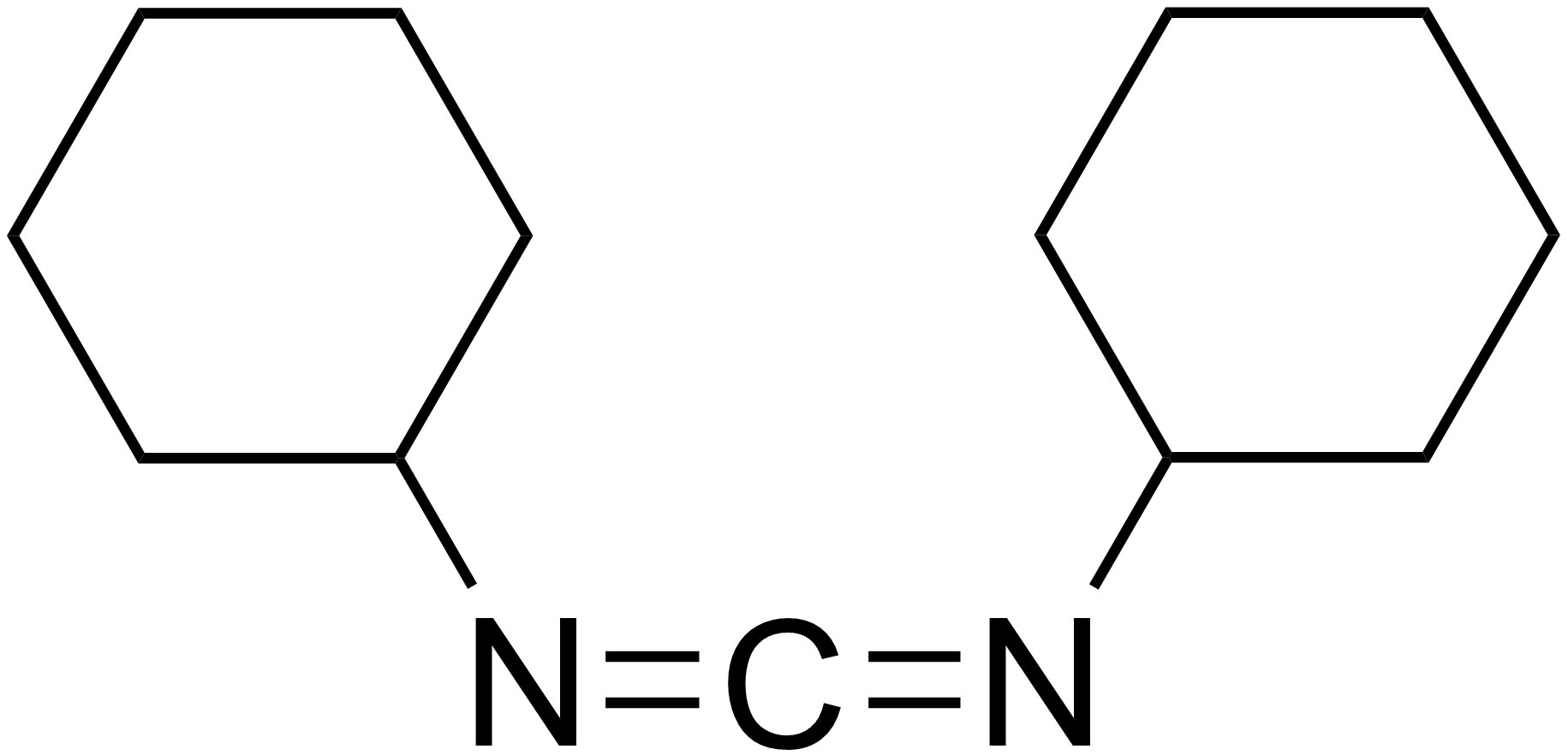
Structure of N,N'-dicyclohexylcarbodiimide

DCC (acronym for N,N'-dicyclohexylcarbodiimide) was one of the first carbodiimides developed as a reagent. It is widely used for amide and ester formation, especially for solid-phase synthesis of peptides. DCC has achieved popularity mainly because of its high-yielding amide coupling reactions and the fact that it is quite inexpensive.

However, DCC does have some serious drawbacks, and its use is often avoided for several reasons:

1. The byproduct N,N'-dicyclohexylurea is mostly removed by filtration, but trace impurities can be difficult to remove. It is incompatible with traditional solid-phase peptide synthesis.
2. DCC is a potent allergen, and repeated contact with skin increases the probability of sensitization to the compound. Clinical reports of individuals who cannot enter rooms where peptide coupling agents are used have been reported.

=== DIC ===
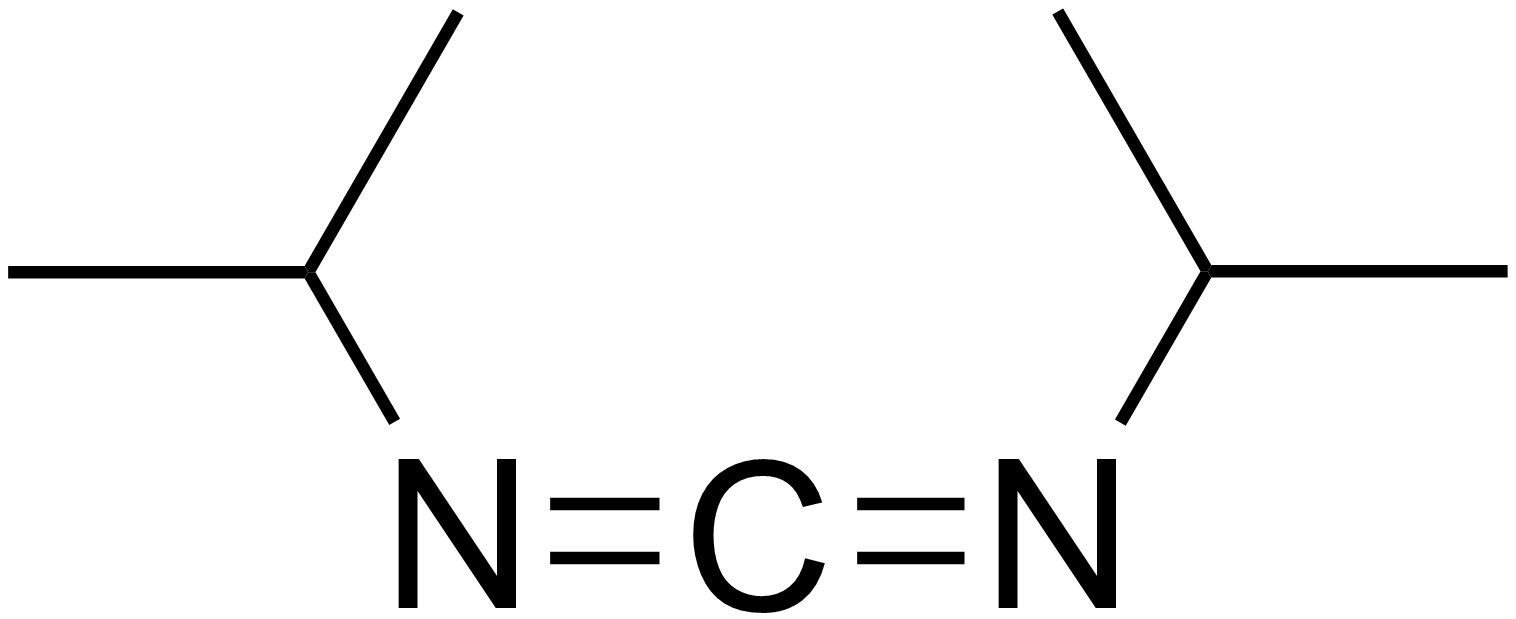
Structure of N,N'-diisopropylcarbodiimide

In contrast to DCC, DIC (N,N'-diisopropylcarbodiimide) is a liquid. the byproduct, N,N'-diisopropylurea, is soluble in organic solvents.

=== EDC ===
EDC is a water-soluble carbodiimide reagent used for a wide range of purposes. Apart from uses similar to those of DCC and DIC, it is also used for various biochemical purposes as a crosslinker or chemical probe.

=== CMCT or CMC ===
1-cyclohexyl-(2-morpholinoethyl)carbodiimide metho-p-toluene sulfonate is a carbodiimide developed for the chemical probing of RNA structure in biochemistry.

== See also ==
- Sulfur diimide - the sulfur analogue
