= Peptide synthesis =

Production of peptides

Coupling of two amino acids in solution. The unprotected amine of one reacts with the unprotected carboxylic acid group of the other to form a peptide bond. In this example, the second reactive group (amine/acid) in each of the starting materials bears a protecting group.

In organic chemistry, peptide synthesis is the production of peptides, compounds where multiple amino acids are linked via amide bonds, also known as peptide bonds. Peptides are chemically synthesized by the condensation reaction of the carboxyl group of one amino acid to the amino group of another. Protecting group strategies are usually necessary to prevent undesirable side reactions with the various amino acid side chains. Chemical peptide synthesis most commonly starts at the carboxyl end of the peptide (C-terminus), and proceeds toward the amino-terminus (N-terminus). Protein biosynthesis (long peptides) in living organisms occurs in the opposite direction.

The chemical synthesis of peptides can be carried out using classical solution-phase techniques, although these have been replaced in most research and development settings by solid phase methods (see below). Solution phase synthesis retains its usefulness in production of small peptides for industrial purposes.

Chemical peptide synthesis facilitates the production of peptides that are difficult to express in bacteria, the incorporation of unnatural amino acids, peptide/protein backbone modification, and the synthesis of peptides containing D-amino acids.

== Solid phase peptide synthesis ==
The established method for the production of synthetic peptides is known as solid phase peptide synthesis (SPPS). Pioneered by Robert Bruce Merrifield, SPPS allows facile assembly of a target peptide by stepwise addition of amino acids while the growing peptide chain is attached to a macroscopically insoluble solvent-swollen beaded resin support.

=== Characteristics of solid supports ===
The solid support consists of small (~50-to-100 micron diameter), polymeric resin beads functionalized with reactive groups (such as amine or hydroxyl groups) that can be used to attach the nascent peptide chain to the resin polymer. Most often, linker molecules are used to hold the peptide chains and resin together during synthesis. The peptide remains covalently attached to the resin support throughout the synthesis; after the chemical steps involved in adding each amino acid, excess reagents and soluble by-products can be removed by simple solvent washing and filtration. This approach circumvents the chromatographic isolation of the product peptide after each reaction step that is required when using conventional solution phase synthesis. Upon complete peptide synthesis, the linker molecule can be cleaved selectively to release the peptide.

=== General SPPS procedure ===
Stepwise SPPS proceeds from the C-terminal amino acid residue of the target peptide chain covalently attached to the resin support. Each amino acid to be coupled to the N-terminus of the resin bound nascent peptide chain must be protected on its alpha amino group using protecting groups such as Boc (acid-labile) or Fmoc (base-labile), depending on the protection strategy used (see below).

The general SPPS procedure is one of repeated cycles of alternate N-terminal deprotection and peptide bond-forming 'coupling' reactions. The resin is washed with organic solvent between each chemical reaction step. Reactions in SPPS are conducted as follows:

1. The N-alpha amine of the C-terminal amino acid of the target peptide is protected with Fmoc or Boc group
2. Protected amino acid is coupled with free amino groups attached to resin beads
3. Protecting group is removed (see: Protecting groups schemes)
4. The second amino acid with an N-protecting group is coupled with the first one. Coupling reagents facilitate peptide bond formation.
5. The above cycle is repeated until the desired sequence has been synthesized
6. Optionally, the N-terminal amino group undergoes capping, thereby preventing residual unreacted resin-bound peptides from further reaction
7. The linker holding the peptide and resin together is cleaved chemically to release the peptide
8. The crude product is purified using either:
  - reverse-phase high-performance liquid chromatography (HPLC)
  - multicolumn countercurrent solvent gradient purification (MCSGP) which is utilised mainly in the case of longer peptides, due to accumulation of numerous minor byproducts that have similar properties to the desired peptide product. This process is used to maximise the yield without sacrificing purity.

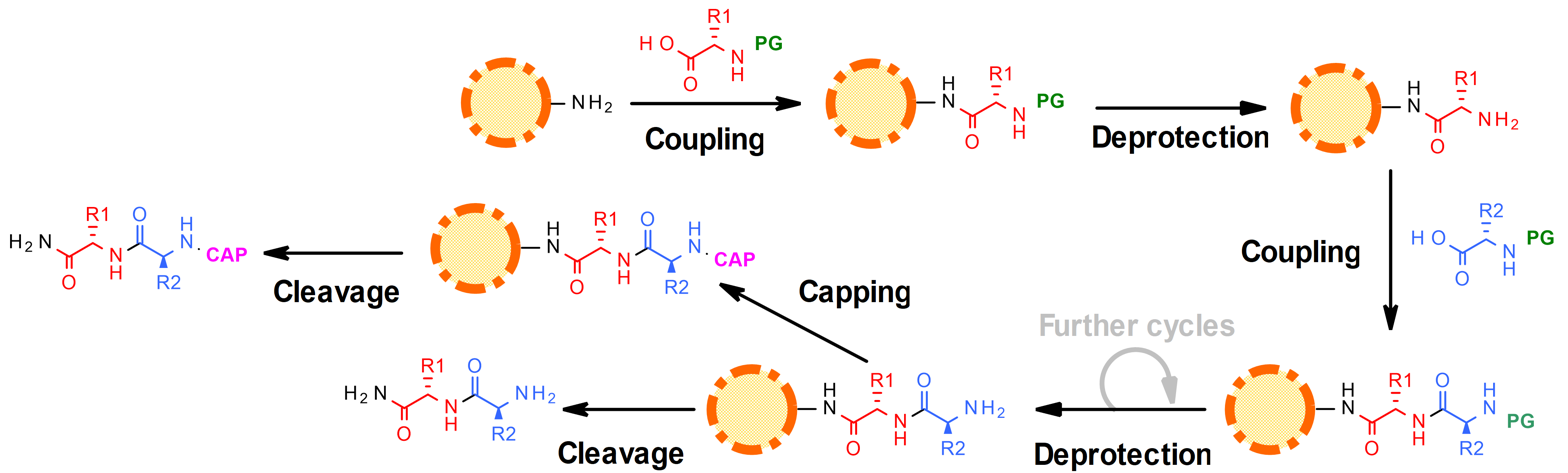
Solid-phase peptide synthesis (PG – protecting group)

SPPS is limited by reaction yields due to the exponential accumulation of by-products, and typically peptides and proteins in the range of 40 or 50 amino acid residues are pushing the limits of synthetic accessibility of SPPS products as homogeneous molecules of defined chemical structure. Synthetic difficulty also is sequence dependent; typically aggregation-prone sequences such as amyloids are difficult to make. Longer peptides can be accessed by using approaches such as native chemical ligation, where two unprotected synthetic peptides can be covalently condensed in aqueous solution.

=== Amino acid coupling reagents ===
An important feature that has enabled the broad application of SPPS is the generation of extremely high yields in the coupling step. In stepwise peptide synthesis by SPPS, highly efficient amide bond-formation conditions are required because all resin-bound peptide products are carried over into the final crude product released from the resin. To illustrate the impact of sub-optimal coupling yields for peptide synthesis, consider the case where each coupling step were to have at least 99% yield: this would result in a 77% overall crude yield for a 26-amino acid peptide (assuming 100% yield in each deprotection); if each coupling were 95% efficient, the overall yield would be 25%. In attempts to maximize coupling yields, often a large excess of each amino acid (between 2- and 10-fold) is used in each SPPS coupling reaction. The minimization of amino acid racemization during coupling is also of vital importance to avoid epimerization in the final peptide product.

Amide bond formation between an amine and carboxylic acid requires 'coupling reagents' to activate the carboxyl group of the N-alpha protected amino acid reactant. A wide range of coupling reagents exist, due in part to their varying effectiveness for particular couplings, many of these reagents are commercially available.

==== Carbodiimides ====
Amide bond formation using DIC/HOBt.

Carbodiimides such as dicyclohexylcarbodiimide (DCC) and diisopropylcarbodiimide (DIC) are frequently used for amide bond formation. The reaction proceeds via the formation of a highly reactive O-acylisourea. This reactive intermediate is attacked by the peptide N-terminal amine, forming a peptide bond. Formation of the O-acylisourea proceeds fastest in non-polar solvents such as dichloromethane.

DIC is particularly useful for SPPS since as a liquid it is easily dispensed, and the urea byproduct is easily washed away. Conversely, the related carbodiimide 1-Ethyl-3-(3-dimethylaminopropyl)carbodiimide (EDC) is often used for solution-phase peptide couplings as its urea byproduct can be removed by washing during aqueous work-up.

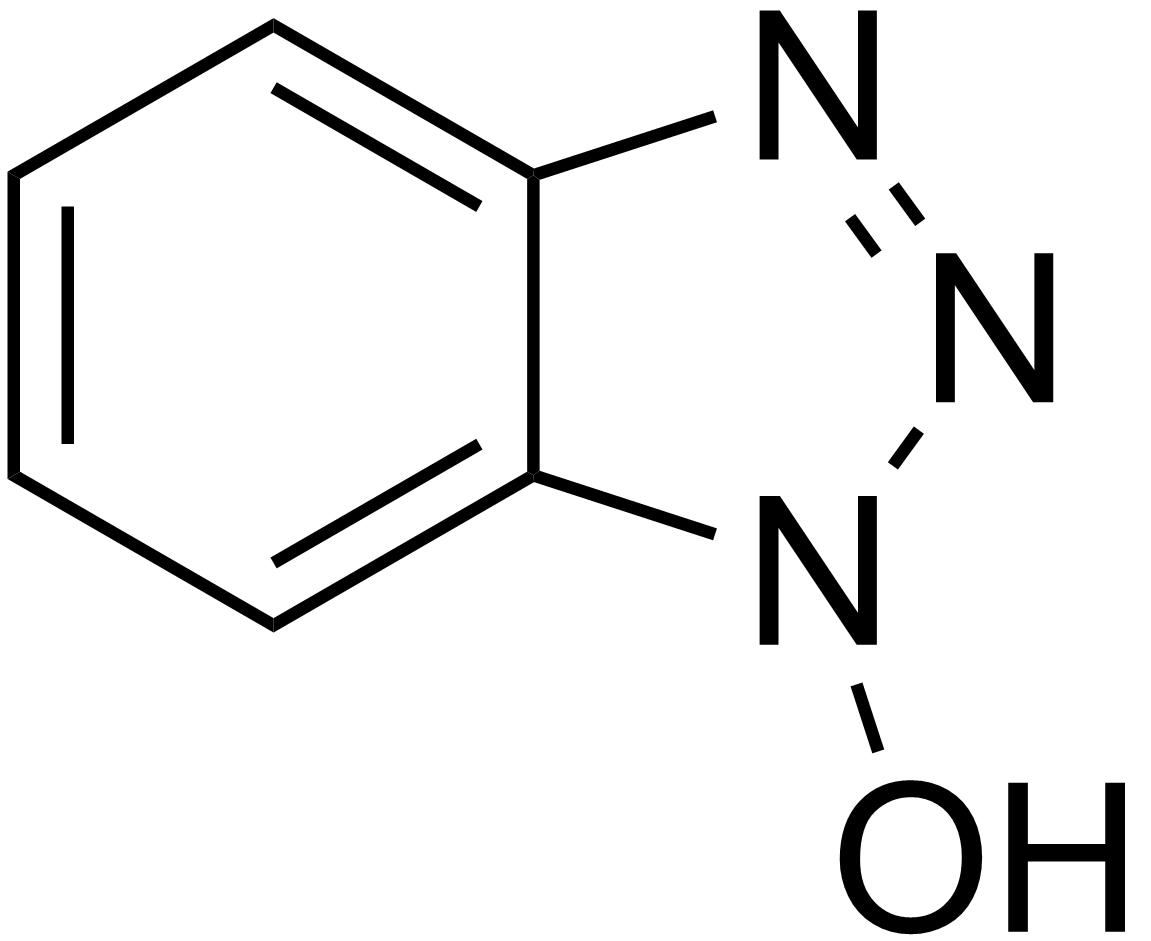
HOBt

HOAt

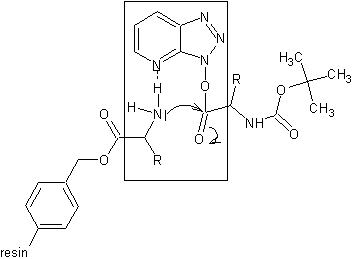
Neighbouring group effect of HOAt

Carbodiimide activation opens the possibility for racemization of the activated amino acid. Racemization can be circumvented with 'racemization suppressing' additives such as the triazoles 1-hydroxy-benzotriazole (HOBt), and 1-hydroxy-7-aza-benzotriazole (HOAt). These reagents attack the O-acylisourea intermediate to form an active ester, which subsequently reacts with the peptide to form the desired peptide bond. Ethyl cyanohydroxyiminoacetate (Oxyma), an additive for carbodiimide coupling, acts as an alternative to HOAt.

==== Amidinium and phosphonium salts ====
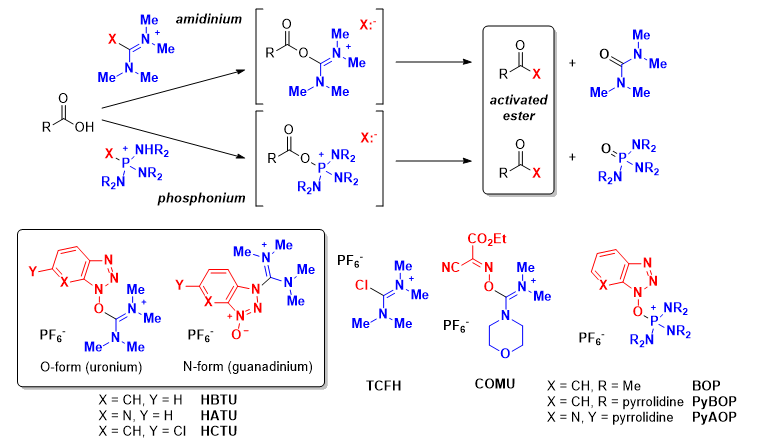

To avoid epimerization through the O-acylisourea intermediate formed when using a carbodiimide reagent, an amidinium- or phosphonium-reagent can be employed These reagents have two parts: an electrophilic moiety which deoxygenates the carboxylic acid (blue) and masked nucleophilic moiety (red). Nucleophilic attack of the carboxylic acid on the electrophilic amidinium or phosphonium moiety leads to a short lived intermediate which is rapidly trapped by the unmasked nucleophile to form the activated ester intermediate and either a urea or phosphoramide by-product. These cationic reagents have non-coordinating counteranions such as a hexafluorophosphate or a tetrafluoroborate. The identity of this anion is typically indicated by the first letter in the reagent's acronym, although the nomenclature can be inconsistent. For example HBTU is a hexafluorophosphate salt while TBTU is a tetrafluoroborate salt. In addition to HBTU and HATU other common reagents include HCTU (6-ClHOBt), TCFH (chloride) and COMU (ethyl cyano(hydroxyimino)acetate). Amidinium reagents incorporating hydroxybenzotriazole moieties can exist in an N-form (guanadinium) or an O-form (uronium), but the N-form is generally more stable. Phosphonium reagents include BOP (HOBt), PyBOP (HOBt) and PyAOP (HOAt). Although these reagents can lead to the same activated ester intermediates as a carbodiimide reagent, the rate of activation is higher due to the high electrophilicity of these cationic reagents. Amidinium reagents are capable of reacting with the peptide N-terminus to form an inactive guanidino by-product, whereas phosphonium reagents are not.

==== Propanephosphonic acid anhydride ====
Since late 2000s, propanephosphonic acid anhydride, sold commercially under various names such as "T3P", has become a useful reagent for amide bond formation in commercial applications. It converts the oxygen of the carboxylic acid into a leaving group, whose peptide-coupling byproducts are water-soluble and can be easily washed away. In a performance comparison between propanephosphonic acid anhydride and other peptide coupling reagents for the preparation of a nonapeptide drug, it was found that this reagent was superior to other reagents with regards to yield and low epimerization.

=== Solid supports ===
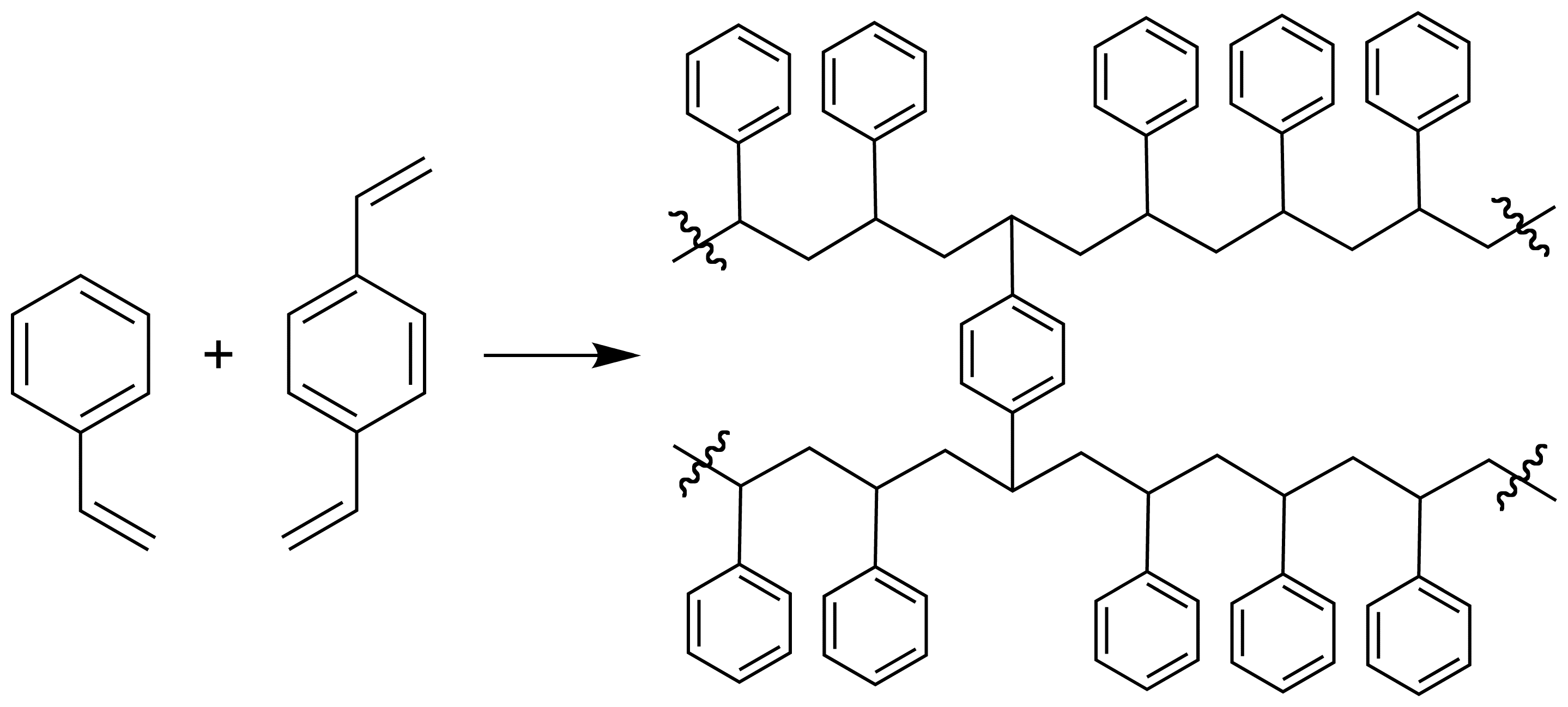
Cross-linked polystyrene is the most common solid support used in SPPS. This image is incorrect: the cross-linker is meta-divinylbenzene

Solid supports for peptide synthesis are selected for physical stability, to permit the rapid filtration of liquids. Suitable supports are inert to reagents and solvents used during SPPS and allow for the attachment of the first amino acid. Swelling is of great importance because peptide synthesis takes place within the solvent-swollen resin beads.

The primary type of solid supports is suspension polymerized copoly(1% m-divinyl + styrene)beaded resin. Improvements to solid supports used for peptide synthesis enhance their ability to withstand the repeated use of TFA during the deprotection step of SPPS. Two primary resins are used, based on whether a C-terminal carboxylic acid or amide is desired. The Wang resin was, as of 1996, the most commonly used resin for peptides with C-terminal carboxylic acids.

=== Protecting groups schemes ===
As described above, the use of N-terminal and side chain protecting groups is essential during peptide synthesis to avoid undesirable side reactions, such as self-coupling of the activated amino acid leading to (polymerization). This would compete with the intended peptide coupling reaction, resulting in low yield or even complete failure to synthesize the desired peptide.

Two principle protecting group schemes are typically used in solid phase peptide synthesis: so-called Boc/benzyl and Fmoc/tert-butyl approaches. The Boc/Bzl strategy utilizes TFA-labile N-terminal Boc protection alongside side chain protection that is removed using anhydrous hydrogen fluoride during the final cleavage step (with simultaneous cleavage of the peptide from the solid support). Fmoc/tBu SPPS uses base-labile Fmoc N-terminal protection, with side chain protection and a resin linkage that are acid-labile (final acidic cleavage is carried out via TFA treatment). Both approaches, including the advantages and disadvantages of each, are outlined in more detail below.

==== Boc/Bzl SPPS ====
Cleavage of the Boc group

Before the advent of SPPS, solution methods for chemical peptide synthesis relied on tert-butyloxycarbonyl (abbreviated 'Boc') as a temporary N-terminal α-amino protecting group. The Boc group is removed with acid, such as trifluoroacetic acid (TFA). This forms a positively charged amino group in the presence of excess TFA (note that the amino group is not protonated in the image on the right), which is neutralized and coupled to the incoming activated amino acid. Neutralization can either occur prior to coupling or in situ during the basic coupling reaction.

The Boc/Bzl approach retains its usefulness in reducing peptide aggregation during synthesis. In addition, Boc/benzyl SPPS may be preferred over the Fmoc/tert-butyl approach when synthesizing peptides containing base-sensitive moieties (such as depsipeptides or thioester moeities), as treatment with base is required during the Fmoc deprotection step (see below).

Permanent side-chain protecting groups used during Boc/benzyl SPPS are typically benzyl or benzyl-based groups. Final removal of the peptide from the solid support occurs simultaneously with side chain deprotection using anhydrous hydrogen fluoride via hydrolytic cleavage. The final product is a fluoride salt which is relatively easy to solubilize. Scavengers such as cresol must be added to the HF in order to prevent reactive cations from generating undesired byproducts.

==== Fmoc/tBu SPPS ====
Cleavage of the Fmoc group. Treatment of the Fmoc-protected amine with piperidine results in proton abstraction from the methine group of the fluorenyl ring system. This leads to release of a carbamate, which decomposes into carbon dioxide (CO_{2}) and the free amine. Dibenzofulvene is also generated. This reaction is able to occur due to the acidity of the fluorenyl proton, resulting from stabilization of the aromatic anion formed. The dibenzofulvene by-product can react with nucleophiles such as the piperidine (which is in large excess), or potentially the released amine.

The use of N-terminal Fmoc deprotection scheme is truly orthogonal under SPPS conditions. Fmoc deprotection is a base-catalyzed elimination reaction that typically uses 20–50% piperidine in DMF. The revealed alpha-amine functionality is therefore neutral, and consequently no neutralization of the peptide-resin is required, as in the case of the Boc/Bzl approach. The lack of electrostatic repulsion between the peptide chains can lead to increased risk of aggregation with Fmoc/tBu SPPS however. Because the liberated fluorenyl group is a chromophore, Fmoc deprotection can be monitored by UV absorbance of the reaction mixture, a strategy which is employed in automated peptide synthesizers.

The ability of the Fmoc group to be cleaved under relatively mild basic conditions while being stable to acid allows the use of side chain protecting groups such as Boc and tBu that can be removed in milder acidic final cleavage conditions (TFA) than those used for final cleavage in Boc/Bzl SPPS (HF). Scavengers such as water and triisopropylsilane (TIPS) are most commonly added during the final cleavage in order to prevent side reactions with reactive cationic species released as a result of side chain deprotection. Nevertheless, many other scavenger compounds could be used as well. The resulting crude peptide is obtained as a TFA salt, which is potentially more difficult to solubilize than the fluoride salts generated in Boc SPPS.

Fmoc/tBu SPPS is less atom-economical, as the fluorenyl group has a much higher mass than the Boc group. Furthermore, prices for Fmoc amino acids were high until the large-scale piloting of one of the first synthesized peptide drugs, enfuvirtide, began in the 1990s, when market demand adjusted the relative prices of Fmoc- vs Boc- amino acids.

==== Other protecting groups ====
===== Benzyloxy-carbonyl =====
The (Z) group is another carbamate-type amine protecting group, discovered by Leonidas Zervas in the early 1930s and usually added via reaction with benzyl chloroformate.

Introduction of the Z protecting group from reaction with benzyl chloroformate (Z-chloride)

It is removed under harsh conditions using HBr in acetic acid, or milder conditions of catalytic hydrogenation.

This methodology was first used in the synthesis of oligopeptides by Zervas and Max Bergmann in 1932. Hence, this became known as the Bergmann-Zervas synthesis, which was characterized "epoch-making" and helped establish synthetic peptide chemistry as a distinct field. It constituted the first useful lab method for controlled peptide synthesis, enabling the synthesis of previously unattainable peptides with reactive side-chains, while Z-protected amino acids are also prevented from undergoing racemization.

The use of the Bergmann-Zervas method remained the standard practice in peptide chemistry for two full decades after its publication, superseded by newer methods (such as the Boc protecting group) in the early 1950s. Nowadays, while it has been used periodically for α-amine protection, it is much more commonly used for side chain protection.

===== Alloc and miscellaneous groups =====
The allyloxycarbonyl (alloc) protecting group is sometimes used to protect an amino group (or carboxylic acid or alcohol group) when an orthogonal deprotection scheme is required. It is also sometimes used when conducting on-resin cyclic peptide formation, where the peptide is linked to the resin by a side-chain functional group. The Alloc group can be removed using tetrakis(triphenylphosphine)palladium(0).

For special applications like synthetic steps involving protein microarrays, protecting groups sometimes termed "lithographic" are used, which are amenable to photochemistry at a particular wavelength of light, and so which can be removed during lithographic types of operations.

==== Regioselective disulfide bond formation ====
The formation of multiple native disulfides remains challenging for native peptide synthesis by solid-phase methods. Random chain combination typically results in several products with nonnative disulfide bonds. Stepwise formation of disulfide bonds is typically the preferred method, and performed with thiol protecting groups. Different thiol protecting groups provide multiple dimensions of orthogonal protection. These orthogonally protected cysteines are incorporated during the solid-phase synthesis of the peptide. Successive removal of these groups, to allow for selective exposure of free thiol groups, leads to disulfide formation in a stepwise manner. The order of removal of the groups must be considered so that only one group is removed at a time.

Thiol protecting groups used in peptide synthesis requiring later regioselective disulfide bond formation must possess multiple characteristics. First, they must be reversible with conditions that do not affect the unprotected side chains. Second, the protecting group must be able to withstand the conditions of solid-phase synthesis. Third, the removal of the thiol protecting group must be such that it leaves intact other thiol protecting groups, if orthogonal protection is desired. That is, the removal of PG A should not affect PG B. Some of the thiol protecting groups commonly used include the acetamidomethyl (Acm), tert-butyl (But), 3-nitro-2-pyridine sulfenyl (NPYS), 2-pyridine-sulfenyl (Pyr), and trityl (Trt) groups. Importantly, the NPYS group can replace the Acm PG to yield an activated thiol.

Using this method, Kiso and coworkers reported the first total synthesis of insulin in 1993. In this work, the A-chain of insulin was prepared with following protecting groups in place on its cysteines: CysA6(But), CysA7(Acm), and CysA11(But), leaving CysA20 unprotected.

== Microwave-assisted peptide synthesis ==
Microwave-assisted peptide synthesis is frequently used to assist Fmoc chemistry SPPS.

== Continuous flow solid-phase peptide synthesis ==
The first article relating to continuous flow peptide synthesis was published in 1986, but due to technical limitations, it was not until the early 2010s when more academic groups started using continuous flow for the rapid synthesis of peptides. The advantages of continuous flow over traditional batch methods are the ability to heat reagents with good temperature control, allowing the speed of reaction kinetics while minimizing side reactions. cycles times vary from 30 seconds, up to 6 minutes, depending on reaction conditions and excess of reagent.

Thanks to inline analytics, such as UV/Vis spectroscopy and the use of Variable Bed Flow reactor (VBFR) that monitor the resin volume, on-resin aggregation can be identified and coupling efficiency can be evaluated.

== Synthesizing long peptides ==
Stepwise elongation, in which consecutive amino acids are added one at a time, is ideal for small peptides containing between 2 and 40 (in rare instances, up to 50) amino acid residues. For the synthesis of longer polypeptide chains segment condensation is used, in which unprotected peptide segments are coupled. Although stepwise SPPS is often used to make longer peptide chains, the purity of long peptide chains made by stepwise SPPS is compromised by the accumulation of resin-bound byproducts formed at each step. Segment condensation by native chemical ligation is preferred over stepwise elongation for synthesizing long peptide chains of defined chemical structure.

An important development for producing longer peptide chains is chemical ligation, in which unprotected peptide chains are condensed chemoselectively in aqueous solution by formation of a non-peptide bond. The most commonly used reaction is native chemical ligation in which a peptide thioester reacts with an N-terminal cysteine residue.

Methods for covalently linking recombinantly produced polypeptides in aqueous solution include split inteins, spontaneous isopeptide bond formation and sortase ligation.

In order to optimize synthesis of long peptides, a method was developed in Medicon Valley for converting peptide sequences. A simple pre-sequence (e.g. Lysine (Lysn); Glutamic Acid (Glun); (LysGlu)n) is incorporated at the C-terminus of the peptide to induce an alpha-helix-like structure. This can potentially increase biological half-life, improve peptide stability and inhibit enzymatic degradation without altering pharmacological activity or profile of action.

== Cyclic peptides ==
=== On resin cyclization ===
Peptides can be cyclized on a solid support. A variety of cyclization reagents can be used such as HBTU/HOBt/DIEA, PyBop/DIEA, PyClock/DIEA. Head-to-tail peptides can be made on the solid support. The deprotection of the C-terminus at some suitable point allows on-resin cyclization by amide bond formation with the deprotected N-terminus. Once cyclization has taken place, the peptide is cleaved from resin by acidolysis and purified.

The strategy for the solid phase synthesis of cyclic peptides is not limited to attachment through Asp, Glu or Lys side chains. Cysteine has a very reactive sulfhydryl group on its side chain. A disulfide bridge is created when a sulfur atom from one cysteine forms a single covalent bond with another sulfur atom from a second cysteine in a different part of the protein. These bridges help to stabilize proteins, especially those secreted from cells. Some researchers use modified cysteines using S-acetamidomethyl (Acm) to block the formation of the disulfide bond but preserve the cysteine and the protein's original primary structure.

=== Off-resin cyclization ===
Off-resin cyclization is a solid phase synthesis of key intermediates, followed by the key cyclization in solution phase, the final deprotection of any masked side chains is also carried out in solution phase. This has the disadvantages that the efficiencies of solid-phase synthesis are lost in the solution phase steps, that purification from by-products, reagents and unconverted material is required, and that undesired oligomers can be formed if macrocycle formation is involved.

The use of pentafluorophenyl esters (FDPP, PFPOH) and BOP-Cl are useful for cyclizing peptides.

=== Simultaneous cyclization/resin release ===
Small C-terminal cyclic moieties like γ-, δ-, and ε-lactams can be introduced in peptides synthesized on base-labile linkers by deprotecting the C-terminal amino acid bearing an amine on its side-chain and letting it cyclize, thereby releasing the peptide from the resin in the process.

== History ==
The first protected peptide was synthesised by Theodor Curtius in 1882 and the first free peptide was synthesised by Emil Fischer in 1901.

== See also ==
- Oligonucleotide synthesis
- Clicked peptide polymer
- Bailey peptide synthesis
