= N,N'-Diisopropylcarbodiimide =

N,N′-Diisopropylcarbodiimide

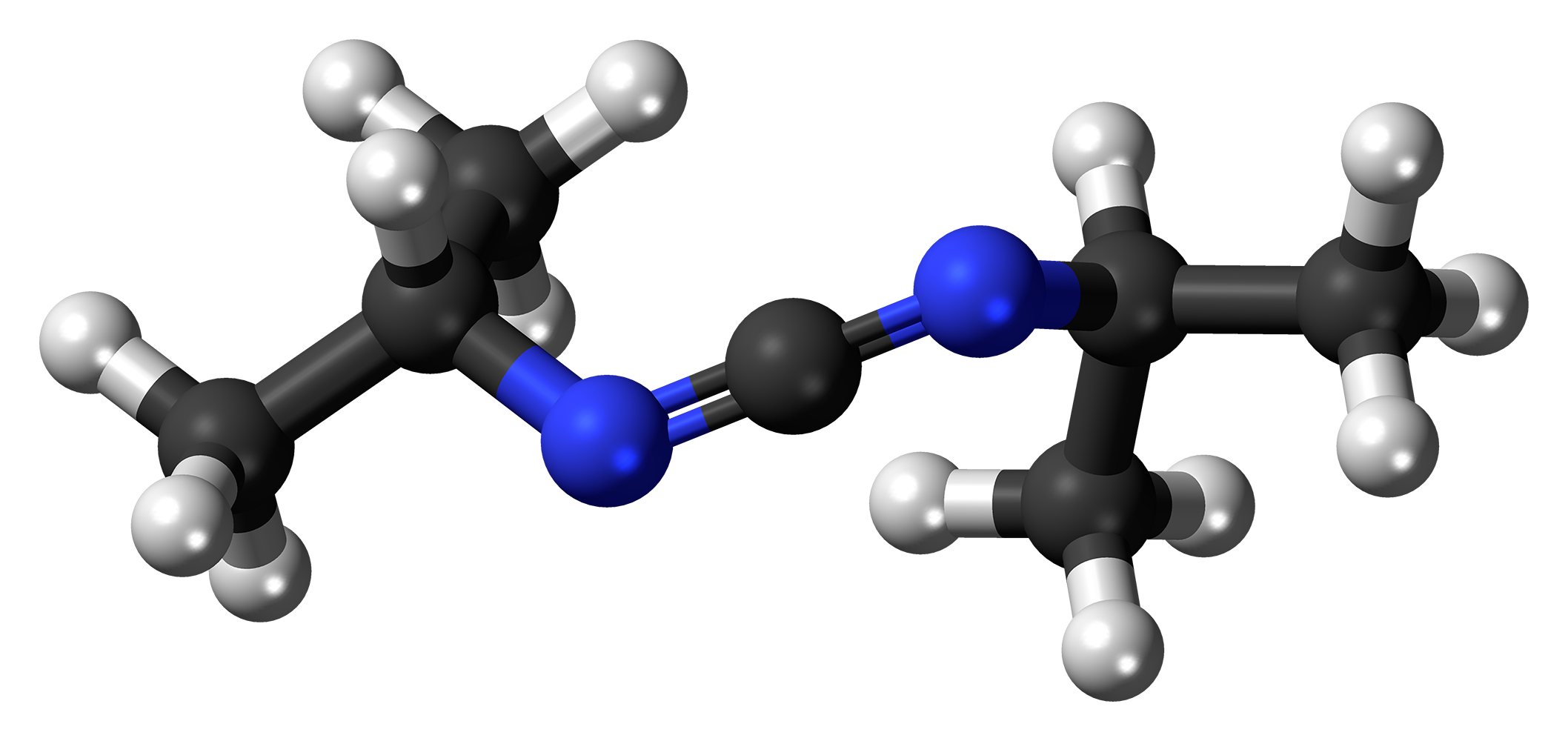

Names
- Preferred IUPAC name N,N'-Di(propan-2-yl)methanediimine
- Other names Diisopropylmethanediimine, DIC

Identifiers
| CAS Number | 693-13-0 |
| 3D model (JSmol) | Interactive image |
| Abbreviations | DIC, DIPC |
| Beilstein Reference | 878281 |
| ChEBI | CHEBI:53092 |
| ChEMBL | ChEMBL1332992 |
| ChemSpider | 12211 |
| ECHA InfoCard | 100.010.677 |
| EC Number | 211-743-7 |
| Gmelin Reference | 101400 |
| PubChem CID | 12734 |
| UNII | OQO20I6TWH |
| CompTox Dashboard (EPA) | DTXSID4025086 |
- InChI: InChI=1S/C7H14N2/c1-6(2)8-5-9-7(3)4/h6-7H,1-4H3 Key: BDNKZNFMNDZQMI-UHFFFAOYSA-N; InChI=1/C7H14N2/c1-6(2)8-5-9-7(3)4/h6-7H,1-4H3 Key: BDNKZNFMNDZQMI-UHFFFAOYAW
- SMILES: CC(C)N=C=NC(C)C

Properties
| Chemical formula | C_{7}H_{14}N_{2} |
| Molar mass | 126.203 g·mol^{−1} |
| Appearance | Liquid |
| Density | 0.806 g/mL |
| Boiling point | 145 to 148 °C (293 to 298 °F; 418 to 421 K) |

Hazards
- GHS labelling
| Pictograms | (GHS02: Flammable) (GHS05: Corrosive) (GHS06: Toxic) (GHS07: Exclamation mark) (GHS08: Health hazard) |
| Signal word | Danger |
| Hazard statements | H226, H315, H317, H318, H330, H334 |
| Precautionary statements | P210, P233, P240, P241, P242, P243, P260, P264, P271, P272, P280, P284, P285, P302+P352, P303+P361+P353, P304+P340, P304+P341, P305+P351+P338, P310, P312, P320, P321, P332+P313, P333+P313, P342+P311, P362, P363, P370+P378, P403+P233, P403+P235, P405, P501 |
| Safety data sheet (SDS) | External MSDS |
- Except where otherwise noted, data are given for materials in their standard state (at 25 °C [77 °F], 100 kPa). verify (what is ?) Infobox references

N,N′-Diisopropylcarbodiimide is a carbodiimide used in peptide synthesis. As a liquid, it is easier to handle than the commonly used N,N′-dicyclohexylcarbodiimide, a waxy solid. In addition, N,N′-diisopropylurea, its byproduct in many chemical reactions, is soluble in most organic solvents, a property that facilitates work-up.

== Safety ==
In vivo Dermal sensitization studies according to OECD 429 confirmed DIC is a strong skin sensitizer, showing a response at 0.20 wt% in the Local Lymph Node Assay (LLNA) placing it in Globally Harmonized System of Classification and Labelling of Chemicals (GHS) Dermal Sensitization Category 1A. Thermal hazard analysis by differential scanning calorimetry (DSC) shows DIC poses minimal explosion risks.
