= Biology of the Cell =

- Discipline: Cell biology
- Language: English
- Edited by: René-Marc Mège

Publication details
- Former names: Journal de Microscopie (1962–1974); Journal de Microscopie et de Biologie Cellulaire (1975–1976); Biologie Cellulaire (1977–1980); Biology of the Cell (1981–present)
- History: 1962–present
- Publisher: Wiley-Blackwell on behalf of the Société Française des Microscopies and the Société de Biologie Cellulaire de France
- Frequency: Monthly
- Open access: After 12 months
- Impact factor: 3.506 (2009)

Standard abbreviations
- ISO 4: Biol. Cell

Indexing
- ISSN: 0248-4900 (print); 1768-322X (web)

Links
- Journal homepage

Biology of the Cell is a peer-reviewed scientific journal in the field of cell biology, cell physiology, and molecular biology of animal and plant cells, microorganisms and protists. Topics covered include development, neurobiology, and immunology, as well as theoretical or biophysical modelling.

The journal is currently published monthly by Wiley-Blackwell on behalf of the Société Française des Microscopies and the Société de Biologie Cellulaire de France.

== History ==
The journal first appeared in 1962 and was originally titled Journal de Microscopie (1962–1974). In 1975 the journal was retitled Journal de Microscopie et de Biologie Cellulaire (ISSN 0395-9260; 1975–1976). It was later retitled Biologie Cellulaire (ISSN 0399-0311; 1977–1980), becoming Biology of the Cell in 1981.

Articles were originally published in either English or French, with summaries in both languages.

== Modern journal ==
Content from 1988 is available online in PDF format, with papers from 2005 also being available in HTML, and from 2006 in an enhanced full-text format.

The journal's 2014 impact factor was 3.506. Biology of the Cell is indexed by BIOBASE, BIOSIS, CAB International, Cambridge Scientific Abstracts, Chemical Abstracts Service, Current Contents/Life Sciences, EMBASE/Excerpta Medica, MEDLINE/Index Medicus, and ProQuest Information and Learning

Articles are primarily research and reviews. Themed series on specific topics are scheduled. They were: Stem Cells (2005), RNA localization (2005), Aquaporins (2005), Synapses (2007), Cell Cycle and Cancer (2008), Microtubules, RNA regulation (2008), Microbiology and Cell Biology (2010), Cilia (2011), Endoplasmic Reticulum (2012), Epigenetics (2012), Post-Translational Modification and Virus Intracellular Trafficking (2012), Optogenetics (2014), Microvesicles and Exosomes (2015), Systems Cell Biology (2015), Translating Canceromics into function (2015).

The editor-in-chief of this journal is René-Marc Mège, a team leader at the Institut Jacques Monod. He was preceded by Thierry Galli (INSERM) who was editor from 2009 - 2017.
