= Dicyclohexylurea =

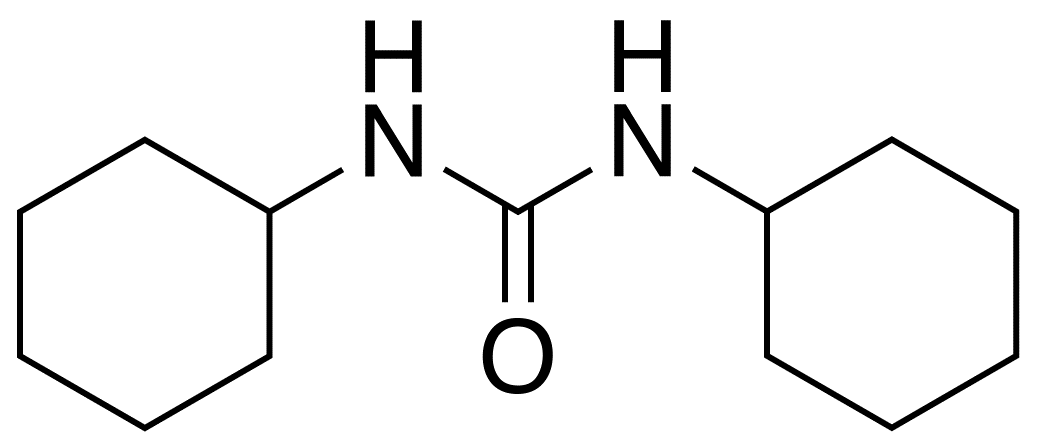

Names
- Preferred IUPAC name N,N′-Dicyclohexylurea
- Other names DCU

Identifiers
CAS Number	2387-23-7
3D model (JSmol)	Interactive image
ChEMBL	ChEMBL1458
ChemSpider	4126
ECHA InfoCard	100.017.468
EC Number	219-213-7
PubChem CID	4277
UNII	ZV7823VVIM
CompTox Dashboard (EPA)	DTXSID3062366
- InChI: InChI=1S/C13H24N2O/c16-13(14-11-7-3-1-4-8-11)15-12-9-5-2-6-10-12/h11-12H,1-10H2,(H2,14,15,16) Key: ADFXKUOMJKEIND-UHFFFAOYSA-N; InChI=1/C13H24N2O/c16-13(14-11-7-3-1-4-8-11)15-12-9-5-2-6-10-12/h11-12H,1-10H2,(H2,14,15,16) Key: ADFXKUOMJKEIND-UHFFFAOYAR; InChI=1S/C13H24N2O/c16-13(14-11-7-3-1-4-8-11)15-12-9-5-2-6-10-12/h11-12H,1-10H2,(H2,14,15,16) Key: ADFXKUOMJKEIND-UHFFFAOYSA-N
- SMILES: O=C(NC1CCCCC1)NC2CCCCC2

Properties
Chemical formula	C_{13}H_{24}N_{2}O
Molar mass	224.348 g·mol^{−1}
Melting point	230 to 233 °C (446 to 451 °F; 503 to 506 K)

Hazards
- GHS labelling
Pictograms	(GHS07: Exclamation mark)
Signal word	Warning
Hazard statements	H302
Precautionary statements	P264, P270, P301+P312, P330, P501
Safety data sheet (SDS)	External MSDS
- Except where otherwise noted, data are given for materials in their standard state (at 25 °C [77 °F], 100 kPa). verify (what is ?) Infobox references

Dicyclohexylurea is an organic compound, specifically, a urea. It is the byproduct of the reaction of dicyclohexylcarbodiimide with amines or alcohols. It may be prepared by the reaction of cyclohexylamine and S,S-dimethyl dithiocarbonate. 1,3-Dicyclohexyl urea (DCU) is a potent soluble epoxide hydrolase (sEH) inhibitor. It has been shown to lower systemic blood pressure by 22 ± 4 mmHg in SHR.
