= Fluorenylmethyloxycarbonyl protecting group =

Base-labile protecting group

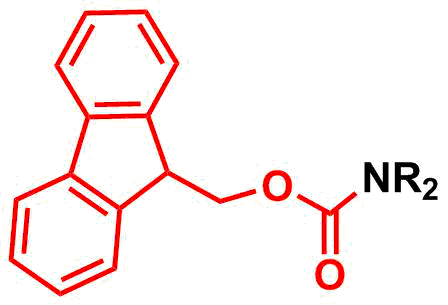
The Fmoc group (in red)

The fluorenylmethoxycarbonyl protecting group (Fmoc) is a base-labile amine protecting group used in organic synthesis, particularly in peptide synthesis. It is popular for its stability toward acids and hydrolysis and its selective removal by weak bases, such as piperidine, without affecting most other protecting groups or sensitive functional groups. Fmoc protection is especially advantageous in solid-phase peptide synthesis (SPPS), where its compatibility with other reagents and ease of removal streamline synthesis workflows. Upon deprotection, Fmoc yields a byproduct (Dibenzofulvene) that can be monitored by UV spectroscopy, allowing for efficient reaction tracking.

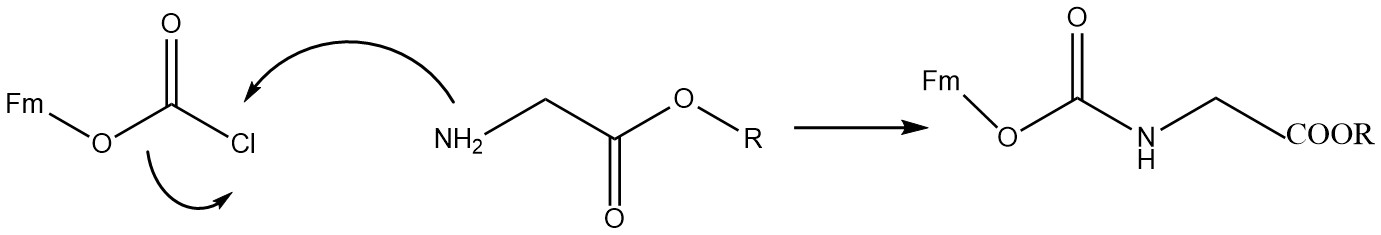
Mechanism of Fmoc protection of amine group

== Protection & Formation ==
Fmoc-carbamate is frequently used as a protecting group for primary and secondary amines, where the Fmoc group can be introduced by reacting the amine with fluorenylmethyloxycarbonyl chloride (Fmoc-Cl), e.g.:

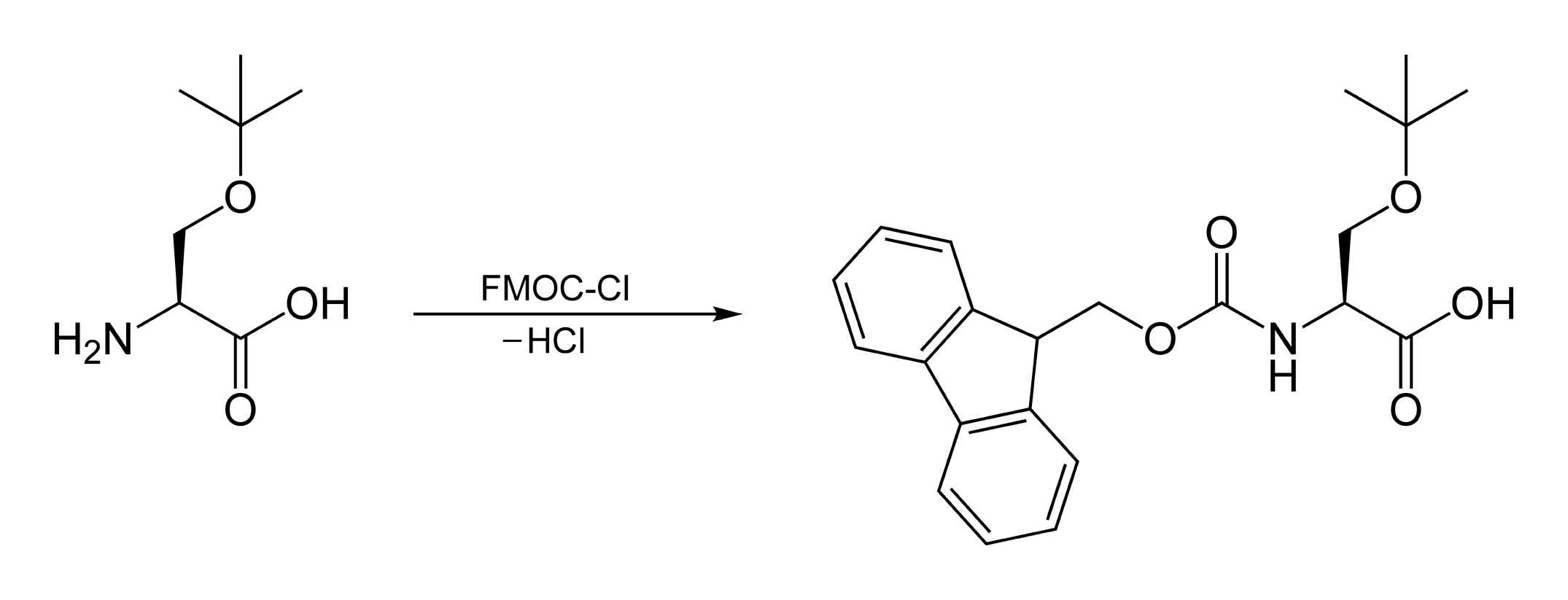

The other common method for introducing the Fmoc group is through 9-fluorenylmethylsuccinimidyl carbonate (Fmoc-OSu), which may itself be obtained by the reaction of Fmoc-Cl with the dicyclohexylammonium salt of N-hydroxysuccinimide.

Reacting with 9-fluorenylmethyloxycarbonyl azide (itself made by reacting Fmoc-Cl with sodium azide) in sodium bicarbonate and aqueous dioxane is also a method to install Fmoc group. Because the fluorenyl group is highly fluorescent, certain UV-inactive compounds may be reacted to give the Fmoc derivatives, suitable for analysis by reversed phase HPLC. Analytical uses of Fmoc-Cl that do not use chromatography may be limited by the requirement that excess Fmoc-Cl be removed before an analysis of fluorescence.

== Cleavage & Deprotection ==
The Fmoc group is rapidly removed by base. Piperidine is usually preferred for Fmoc group removal as it forms a stable adduct with the dibenzofulvene byproduct, preventing it from reacting with the substrate.

== Role in Peptide Synthesis ==
The use of Fmoc as a temporary protecting group for amine at the N-terminus in solid phase synthesis is very widespread for Fmoc/tBu approach, because its removal with piperidine does not disturb the acid-labile linker between the peptide and the resin. A typical SPPS Fmoc deprotection is performed with a solution of 20% piperidine in N,N-dimethylformamide (DMF).

C_{13}H_{9}−CH_{2}−OC(O)NHR + (CH_{2})_{5}NH → (CH_{2})_{5}NH^{+}_{2} + [C_{13}H_{8}−CH_{2}−OC(O)NHR]^{−}
[C_{13}H_{8}−CH_{2}−OC(O)NHR]^{−} → C_{13}H_{8}=CH_{2} + ^{−}OC(O)NHR
^{−}OC(O)NHR + (CH_{2})_{5}NH^{+}_{2} → HOC(O)NHR + (CH_{2})_{5}NH
HOC(O)NHR → CO_{2} + RNH_{2}
C_{13}H_{8}=CH_{2} + (CH_{2})_{5}NH → C_{13}H_{9}−CH_{2}N(CH_{2})_{5}

=== Common deprotection cocktails for Fmoc during SPPS ===
- 20% piperidine in DMF (Fmoc group has an approximate half life of 6 seconds in this solution)
- 5% piperazine, 1% DBU and 1% formic acid in DMF. This method avoids the use of strictly controlled piperidine. No side product was observed for a peptide with 9 residues synthesized with this method.
