= 1-Hydroxy-7-azabenzotriazole =

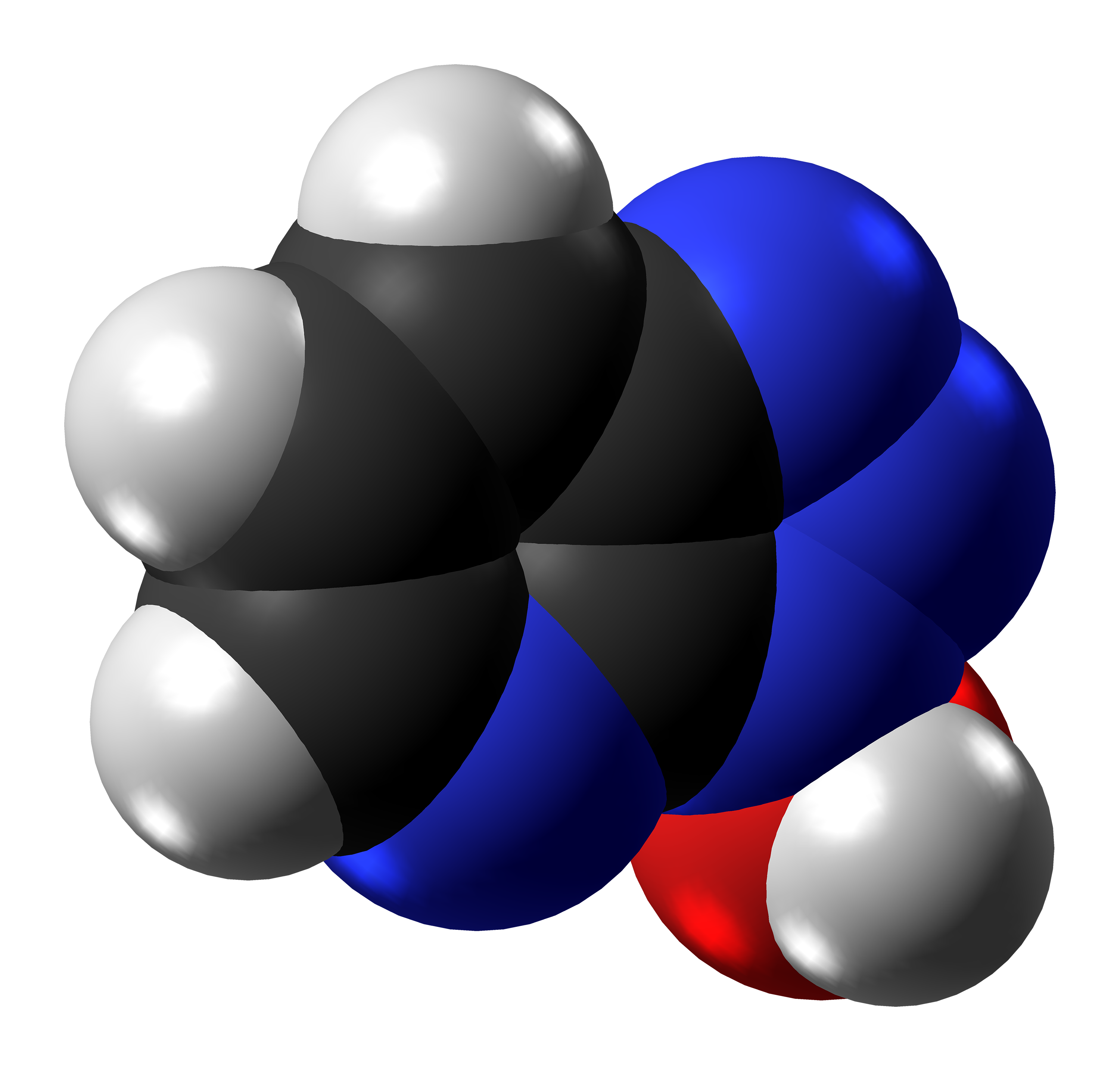

Names
- Preferred IUPAC name 3H-[1,2,3]Triazolo[4,5-b]pyridin-3-ol

Identifiers
CAS Number	39968-33-7
3D model (JSmol)	Interactive image
ChemSpider	158005
ECHA InfoCard	100.122.938
PubChem CID	181649
UNII	TX8XYH09H0
CompTox Dashboard (EPA)	DTXSID0075239
- InChI: InChI=1S/C5H4N4O/c10-9-5-4(7-8-9)2-1-3-6-5/h1-3,10H Key: FPIRBHDGWMWJEP-UHFFFAOYSA-N; InChI=1/C5H4N4O/c10-9-5-4(7-8-9)2-1-3-6-5/h1-3,10H Key: FPIRBHDGWMWJEP-UHFFFAOYAJ
- SMILES: n1cccc2nnn(O)c12

Properties
Chemical formula	C_{5}H_{4}N_{4}O
Molar mass	136.114 g·mol^{−1}
Density	0.973 g/mL
Melting point	213-216°C

Hazards
- GHS labelling
Pictograms	(GHS01: Explosive) (GHS05: Corrosive) (GHS06: Toxic) (GHS07: Exclamation mark)
Signal word	Danger
Hazard statements	H204, H301, H302, H315, H318, H319, H335
Precautionary statements	P210, P240, P250, P261, P264, P270, P271, P280, P301+P310, P301+P312, P302+P352, P304+P340, P305+P351+P338, P310, P312, P321, P330, P332+P313, P337+P313, P362, P370+P380, P372, P373, P374, P401, P403+P233, P405, P501
- Except where otherwise noted, data are given for materials in their standard state (at 25 °C [77 °F], 100 kPa). verify (what is ?) Infobox references

1-Hydroxy-7-azabenzotriazole (HOAt) is a triazole used as a peptide coupling reagent. It suppresses racemization that can otherwise occur during the reaction.

HOAt has a melting point of 213-216 °C.
