= Sensitization (immunology) =

Induction of a response in immune system

In immunology, the term sensitization is used for the following concepts:

- Immunization by inducing an adaptive response in the immune system. In this sense, sensitization is the term more often in usage for induction of allergic responses.
- To bind antibodies to cells such as erythrocytes in advance of performing an immunological test such as a complement-fixation test or a Coombs test. The antibodies are bound to the cells in their Fab regions in the preparation.
- To bind antibodies or soluble antigens chemically or by adsorption to appropriate biological entities such as erythrocytes or particles made of gelatin or latex for passive aggregation tests.

Those particles themselves are biologically inactive except for serving as antigens against the primary antibodies or as carriers of the antigens. When antibodies are used in the preparation, they are bound to the erythrocyte or particles in their Fab regions. Thus the step follows requires the secondary antibodies against those primary antibodies, that is, the secondary antibodies must have binding specificity to the primary antibodies including to their Fc regions.
