= C8H18S =

The molecular formula C_{8}H_{18}S (molar mass: 146.29 g/mol, exact mass: 146.1129 u) may refer to:

- 2-Methyl-2-heptanethiol
- 1-Octanethiol, or 1-mercaptooctane
- n-Octyl mercaptan or Octyl mercaptan
