= List of UN numbers 2501 to 2600 =

UN numbers from UN2501 to UN2600 as assigned by the United Nations Committee of Experts on the Transport of Dangerous Goods are as follows:

== UN 2501 to UN 2600 ==
UN Number	Class	Proper Shipping Name
UN 2501	6.1	Tris(1-aziridinyl)phosphine oxide, solution
UN 2502	8	Valeryl chloride
UN 2503	8	Zirconium tetrachloride
UN 2504	6.1	Tetrabromoethane
UN 2505	6.1	Ammonium fluoride
UN 2506	8	Ammonium hydrogen sulfate
UN 2507	8	Chloroplatinic acid, solid
UN 2508	8	Molybdenum pentachloride
UN 2509	8	Potassium hydrogen sulfate
UN 2510	?	(UN No. no longer in use)
UN 2511	8	2-Chloropropionic acid
UN 2512	6.1	Aminophenols (o-; m-; p-)
UN 2513	8	Bromoacetyl bromide
UN 2514	3	Bromobenzene
UN 2515	6.1	Bromoform
UN 2516	6.1	Carbon tetrabromide
UN 2517	2	1-Chloro-1,1-difluoroethane or Refrigerant gas R 142b
UN 2518	6.1	1,5,9-Cyclododecatriene
UN 2519	?	(UN No. no longer in use)
UN 2520	3	Cyclooctadienes
UN 2521	6.1	Diketene, inhibited
UN 2522	6.1	2-Dimethylaminoethyl methacrylate
UN 2523	?	(UN No. no longer in use)
UN 2524	3	Ethyl orthoformate
UN 2525	6.1	Ethyl oxalate
UN 2526	3	Furfurylamine
UN 2527	3	Isobutyl acrylate, inhibited
UN 2528	3	Isobutyl isobutyrate
UN 2529	3	Isobutyric acid
UN 2530	3	(UN No. no longer in use) Isobutyric anhydride (UN No. longer in use)
UN 2531	8	Methacrylic acid, inhibited
UN 2532	?	(UN No. no longer in use)
UN 2533	6.1	Methyl trichloroacetate
UN 2534	2	Methylchlorosilane
UN 2535	3	4-Methylmorpholine or n-methylmorpholine
UN 2536	3	Methyltetrahydrofuran
UN 2537	?	(UN No. no longer in use) Chlorodifluoroethane (UN No. no longer in use)
UN 2538	4.1	Nitronaphthalene
UN 2539	?	(UN No. no longer in use) Octylaldehyde (UN No. no longer in use)
UN 2540	?	(UN No. no longer in use)
UN 2541	3	Terpinolene
UN 2542	6.1	Tributylamine
UN 2543 to 2544	?	(UN No.s no longer in use)
UN 2545	4.2	Hafnium powder, dry
UN 2546	4.2	Titanium powder, dry
UN 2547	5.1	Sodium superoxide
UN 2548	2	Chlorine pentafluoride
UN 2549	?	(UN No. no longer in use)
UN 2550	?	(UN No. no longer in use) Ethyl methyl ketone peroxides (UN No. no longer in use)
UN 2551	?	(UN No. no longer in use) tert-Butyl peroxydiethylacetate with tert-Butyl peroxybenzoate (UN No. no longer in use)
UN 2552	6.1	Hexafluoroacetone hydrate
UN 2553	?	(UN No. no longer in use) Coal tar naphtha (UN No. no longer in use)
UN 2554	3	Methyl allyl chloride
UN 2555	4.1	Nitrocellulose with water with not less than 25 percent water, by mass
UN 2556	4.1	Nitrocellulose, with alcohol with not less than 25 percent alcohol, by mass, and with not more than 12.6 percent nitrogen, by dry mass
UN 2557	4.1	Nitrocellulose, with not more than 12.6 percent nitrogen, by dry mass, or Nitrocellulose mixture with pigment or Nitrocellulose mixture with plasticizer or Nitrocellulose mixture with pigment and plasticizer
UN 2558	6.1	Epibromohydrin
UN 2559	?	(UN No. no longer in use) Chloromethylpropanes (UN No. no longer in use)
UN 2560	3	2-Methylpentan-2-ol
UN 2561	3	3-Methyl-1-butene
UN 2562	?	(UN No. no longer in use) tert-Butyl peroxyisobutyrate (UN No. no longer in use)
UN 2563	?	(UN No. no longer in use)
UN 2564	8	Trichloroacetic acid, solution
UN 2565	8	Dicyclohexylamine
UN 2566	?	(UN No. no longer in use)
UN 2567	6.1	Sodium pentachlorophenate
UN 2568	?	(UN No. no longer in use)
UN 2569	?	(UN No. no longer in use) Trichloro-s-triazinetrione and its salts, dry (UN No. no longer in use)
UN 2570	6.1	Cadmium compounds
UN 2571	8	Alkylsulfuric acids
UN 2572	6.1	Phenylhydrazine
UN 2573	5.1	Thallium chlorate
UN 2574	6.1	Tricresyl phosphate with more than 3 percent ortho isomer
UN 2575	?	(UN No. no longer in use) Vanadium compounds, not otherwise specified (UN No. no longer in use)
UN 2576	8	Phosphorus oxybromide, molten
UN 2577	8	Phenylacetyl chloride
UN 2578	8	Phosphorus trioxide
UN 2579	8	Piperazine
UN 2580	8	Aluminum bromide, solution
UN 2581	8	Aluminum chloride, solution
UN 2582	8	Ferric chloride, solution
UN 2583	8	Alkyl sulfonic acids, solid or Aryl sulfonic acids, solid with more than 5 percent free sulfuric acid
UN 2584	8	Alkyl sulfonic acids, liquid or Aryl sulfonic acids, liquid with more than 5 percent free sulfuric acid
UN 2585	8	Alkyl sulfonic acids, solid or Aryl sulfonic acids, solid with not more than 5 percent free sulfuric acid
UN 2586	8	Alkyl sulfonic acids, liquid or Aryl sulfonic acids, liquid with not more than 5 percent free sulfuric acid
UN 2587	6.1	Benzoquinone
UN 2588	6.1	Pesticides, solid, toxic, not otherwise specified
UN 2589	6.1	Vinyl chloroacetate
UN 2590	9	White asbestos (chrysotile, actinolite, anthophyllite, tremolite)
UN 2591	2	Xenon, refrigerated liquid (cryogenic liquids)
UN 2592	?	(UN No. no longer in use) Distearyl peroxydicarbonate (UN No. no longer in use)
UN 2593	?	(UN No. no longer in use) Di-(2-methylbenzoyl)peroxide (UN No. no longer in use)
UN 2594	?	(UN No. no longer in use) tert-Butyl peroxyneodecanoate (UN No. no longer in use)
UN 2595	?	(UN No. no longer in use) Dimyristylperoxydicarbonate (UN No. no longer in use)
UN 2596	?	(UN No. no longer in use) 3-tert-Butyl peroxy-3-phenylphthalide (UN No. no longer in use)
UN 2597	?	(UN No. no longer in use) Di-(3,5,5,-trimethyl-1,2-dioxolanyl-3)peroxide (UN No no longer in use)
UN 2598	?	(UN No. no longer in use) Ethyl-3,3-di-(tert-butylperoxy)butyrate (UN No. no longer in use)
UN 2599	2	Chlorotrifluoromethane and trifluoromethane azeotropic mixture or Refrigerant gas R 503 with approximately 60 percent chlorotrifluoromethane
UN 2600	2	(UN No. no longer in use) Carbon monoxide and hydrogen mixture, compressed (UN No. no longer in use)

== See also ==
- Lists of UN numbers
