= List of UN numbers 3001 to 3100 =

UN numbers from UN3001 to UN3100 as assigned by the United Nations Committee of Experts on the Transport of Dangerous Goods are as follows:

== UN 3001 to UN 3100 ==
UN Number	Class	Proper Shipping Name
UN 3001	6.1	(UN No. no longer in use) Phenoxy pesticides, liquid, toxic, flammable (UN No. no longer in use)
UN 3002	(6.1)	(UN No. no longer in use) Phenyl urea pesticides, liquid, toxic (UN No. no longer in use)
UN 3003	(6.1)	(UN No. no longer in use) Benzoic derivative pesticides, liquid, toxic, flammable (UN No. no longer in use)
UN 3004	6.1	(UN No. no longer in use) Benzoic derivative pesticides, liquid, toxic (UN No. no longer in use)
UN 3005	6.1	Thiocarbamate pesticides, liquid, toxic, flammable, flashpoint not less than 23 °C
UN 3006	6.1	Thiocarbamate pesticide, liquid, toxic
UN 3007	(6.1)	(UN No. no longer in use) Phthalimide derivative pesticides, liquid, toxic, flammable (UN No. no longer in use)
UN 3008	6.1	(UN No. no longer in use) Phthalimide derivative pesticides, liquid, toxic (UN No. no longer in use)
UN 3009	6.1	Copper based pesticides, liquid, toxic, flammable, flashpoint not less than 23 °C
UN 3010	6.1	Copper based pesticides, liquid, toxic
UN 3011	6.1	Mercury based pesticides, liquid, toxic, flammable, flashpoint not less than 23 °C
UN 3012	6.1	Mercury based pesticides, liquid, toxic
UN 3013	6.1	Substituted nitrophenol pesticides, liquid, toxic, flammable, flashpoint not less than 23 °C
UN 3014	6.1	Substituted nitrophenol pesticides, liquid, toxic
UN 3015	6.1	Bipyridilium pesticides, liquid, toxic, flammable, flashpoint not less than 23 °C
UN 3016	6.1	Bipyridilium pesticides, liquid, toxic
UN 3017	6.1	Organophosphorus pesticides, liquid, toxic, flammable, flashpoint not less than 23 °C
UN 3018	6.1	Organophosphorus pesticides, liquid, toxic
UN 3019	6.1	Organotin pesticides, liquid, toxic, flammable, flashpoint not less than 23 °C
UN 3020	6.1	Organotin pesticides, liquid, toxic
UN 3021	3	Pesticides, liquid, flammable, toxic, flashpoint less than 23 °C
UN 3022	3	1,2-Butylene oxide, stabilized
UN 3023	6.1	2-Methyl-2-heptanethiol
UN 3024	3	Coumarin derivative pesticides, liquid, flammable, toxic, flashpoint less than 23 °C
UN 3025	6.1	Coumarin derivative pesticides, liquid, toxic, flammable, flashpoint not less than 23 °C
UN 3026	6.1	Coumarin derivative pesticides, liquid, toxic
UN 3027	6.1	Coumarin derivative pesticides, solid, toxic
UN 3028	8	Batteries, dry, containing potassium hydroxide solid, electric, storage
UN 3029 to 3047	?	(UN Nos. no longer in use)
UN 3048	6.1	Aluminium phosphide pesticides
UN 3049	(4.2)	(UN No. no longer in use) Metal alkyl halides, water-reactive, n.o.s. or Metal aryl halides, water-reactive, n.o.s. (UN No. no longer in use)
UN 3050	(4.2)	(UN No. no longer in use) Metal alkyl hydrides, water-reactive, n.o.s. or Metal aryl hydrides, water-reactive, n.o.s. (UN No. no longer in use)
UN 3051	(4.2)	(UN No. no longer in use) Aluminium alkyls (UN No. no longer in use)
UN 3052	(4.2)	(UN No. no longer in use) Aluminium alkyl halides (UN No. no longer in use)
UN 3053	(4.2)	(UN No. no longer in use) Magnesium alkyls (UN No. no longer in use)
UN 3054	3	Cyclohexyl mercaptan
UN 3055	8	2-(2-Aminoethoxy) ethanol
UN 3056	3	n-Heptaldehyde
UN 3057	2	Trifluoroacetyl chloride
UN 3058 to 3063	?	(UN Nos. no longer in use) (Previously a selection of organic peroxides, class 5.2. See UN 3101 to UN 3120)
UN 3064	3	Nitroglycerin, solution in alcohol, with more than 1 percent but not more than 5 percent nitroglycerin
UN 3065	3	Alcoholic beverages
UN 3066	8	Paint or Paint related material
UN 3067 to 3069	?	(UN Nos. no longer in use)
UN 3070	2.2	Ethylene oxide and dichlorodifluoromethane mixture with not more than 12.5 percent ethylene oxide
UN 3071	6.1	Mercaptans, liquid, toxic, flammable, n.o.s. or Mercaptan mixtures, liquid, toxic, flammable, n.o.s., flashpoint not less than 23 °C
UN 3072	9	Life-saving appliances, not self-inflating containing dangerous goods as equipment
UN 3073	6.1	Vinylpyridines, inhibited
UN 3074 to 3075	?	(UN Nos. no longer in use)
UN 3076	(4.2)	(UN No. no longer in use) Aluminium alkyl hydrides (UN No. no longer in use)
UN 3077	9	Environmentally hazardous substance, solid, n.o.s. (not including waste)
UN 3078	4.3	Cerium, turnings or gritty powder
UN 3079	3	Methacrylonitrile, inhibited
UN 3080	6.1	Isocyanates, toxic, flammable, n.o.s. or Isocyanate solutions, toxic, flammable, n.o.s. flashpoint not less than 23 °C but not more than 61 °C and boiling point less than 300 °C
UN 3081	?	(UN No. no longer in use)
UN 3082	9	Environmentally hazardous substance, liquid, n.o.s.
UN 3083	2.3	Perchloryl fluoride
UN 3084	8	Corrosive solid, oxidizing, n.o.s.
UN 3085	5.1	Oxidizing solid, corrosive, n.o.s.
UN 3086	6.1	Toxic solid, oxidizing, n.o.s.
UN 3087	5.1	Oxidizing solid, toxic, n.o.s.
UN 3088	4.2	Self-heating solid, organic, n.o.s.
UN 3089	4.1	Metal powder, flammable, n.o.s.
UN 3090	9	Lithium metal batteries
UN 3091	9	Lithium metal batteries contained in equipment or Lithium metal batteries packed with equipment
UN 3092	3	1-Methoxy-2-propanol
UN 3093	8	Corrosive liquid, oxidizing, n.o.s.
UN 3094	8	Corrosive liquid, water-reactive, n.o.s.
UN 3095	8	Corrosive solid, self-heating, n.o.s.
UN 3096	8	Corrosive solids, water-reactive, n.o.s.
UN 3097	4.1	Flammable solid, oxidizing, n.o.s.
UN 3098	5.1	Oxidizing liquid, corrosive, n.o.s.
UN 3099	5.1	Oxidizing liquid, toxic, n.o.s.
UN 3100	5.1	Oxidizing solid, self-heating, n.o.s.

== See also ==
- Lists of UN numbers
