= PyBOP =

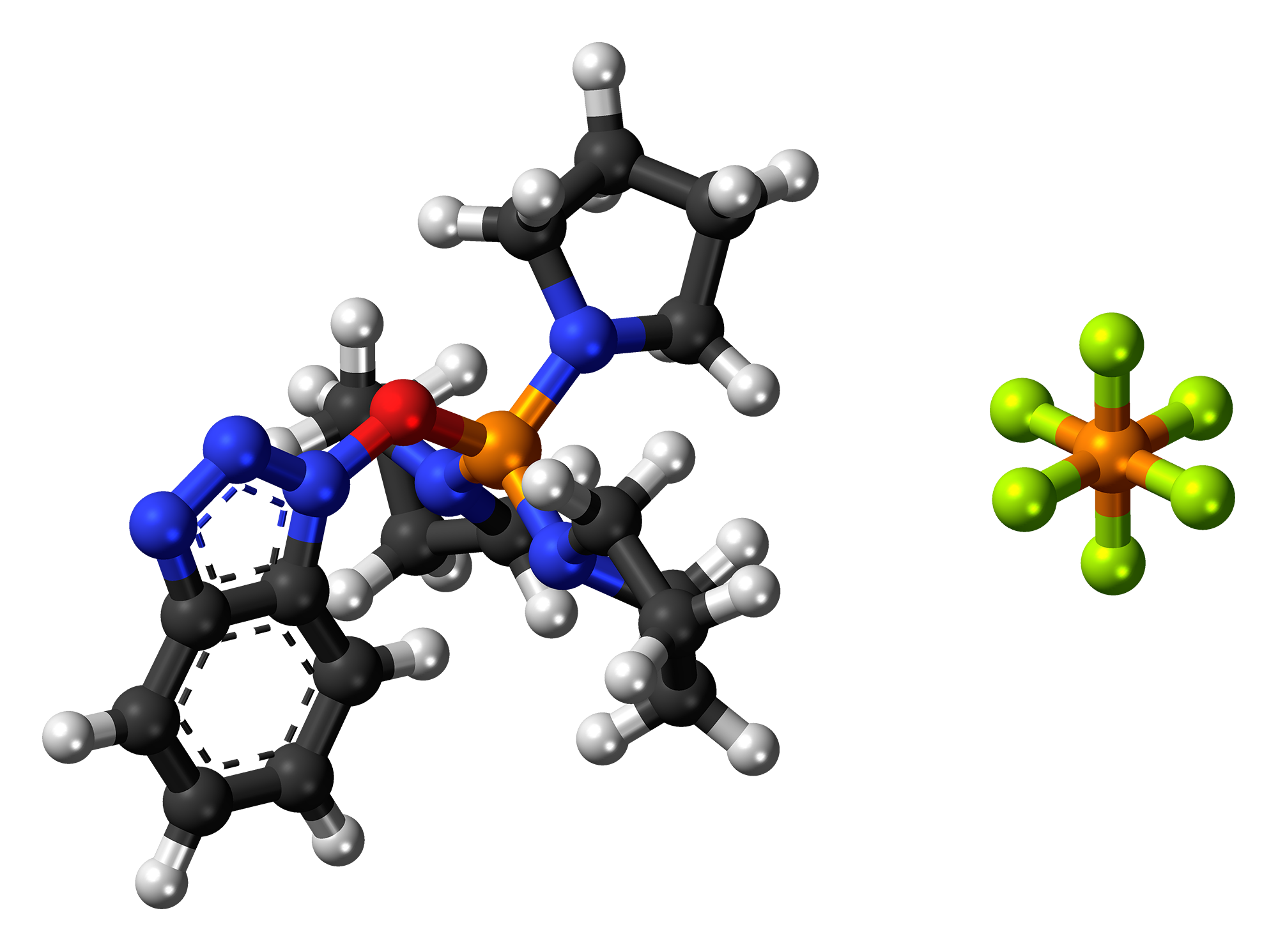

Names
- IUPAC name (Benzotriazol-1-yloxy)tripyrrolidinophosphonium hexafluorophosphate
- Other names PyBOP

Identifiers
CAS Number	128625-52-5
3D model (JSmol)	Interactive image
ChemSpider	2006820
ECHA InfoCard	100.125.168
PubChem CID	2724699
UNII	Y6KQR4GY6T
CompTox Dashboard (EPA)	DTXSID40369209
- InChI: InChI=1S/C18H28N6OP.F6P/c1-2-10-18-17(9-1)19-20-24(18)25-26(21-11-3-4-12-21,22-13-5-6-14-22)23-15-7-8-16-23;1-7(2,3,4,5)6/h1-2,9-10H,3-8,11-16H2;/q+1;-1 Key: VIAFLMPQBHAMLI-UHFFFAOYSA-N; InChI=1/C18H28N6OP.F6P/c1-2-10-18-17(9-1)19-20-24(18)25-26(21-11-3-4-12-21,22-13-5-6-14-22)23-15-7-8-16-23;1-7(2,3,4,5)6/h1-2,9-10H,3-8,11-16H2;/q+1;-1 Key: VIAFLMPQBHAMLI-UHFFFAOYAY
- SMILES: F[P-](F)(F)(F)(F)F.n4nn(O[P+](N1CCCC1)(N2CCCC2)N3CCCC3)c5ccccc45

Properties
Chemical formula	C_{18}H_{28}F_{6}N_{6}OP_{2}
Molar mass	520.401 g·mol^{−1}
Appearance	White crystals
Melting point	150 °C (302 °F; 423 K)

Hazards
- Occupational safety and health (OHS/OSH)
Main hazards	Irritant
- GHS labelling
Pictograms	(GHS07: Exclamation mark)
Signal word	Warning
Hazard statements	H315, H319, H335
Precautionary statements	P261, P305+P351+P338
- Except where otherwise noted, data are given for materials in their standard state (at 25 °C [77 °F], 100 kPa). verify (what is ?) Infobox references

PyBOP (benzotriazol-1-yloxytripyrrolidinophosphonium hexafluorophosphate) is a reagent used to prepare amides from carboxylic acids and amines in the context of peptide synthesis. It can be prepared from 1-hydroxybenzotriazole and a chlorophosphonium reagent under basic conditions. It is a substitute for the BOP reagent that avoids the formation of the carcinogenic waste product HMPA. Thermal hazard analysis by differential scanning calorimetry (DSC) shows PyBOP is potentially explosive.

== See also ==
- BOP reagent
- DEPBT, a related reagent that contains no phosphorus-nitrogen bonds
- HATU
- HBTU
