= List of UN numbers 1701 to 1800 =

UN numbers from UN1701 to UN1800 as assigned by the United Nations Committee of Experts on the Transport of Dangerous Goods are as follows:

== UN 1701 to UN 1800 ==
UN Number	Class	Proper Shipping Name
UN 1701	6.1	Xylyl bromide, liquid
UN 1702	6.1	1,1,2,2-Tetrachloroethane
UN 1703	?	(UN No. no longer in use) Tetraethyl dithiopyrophosphate and compressed gas mixture (UN No. no longer in use)
UN 1704	6.1	Tetraethyl dithiopyrophosphate
UN 1705	?	(UN No. no longer in use) Tetraethyl pyrophosphate and compressed gas mixture (UN No. no longer in use)
UN 1706	?	(UN No. no longer in use)
UN 1707	6.1	Thallium compounds, n.o.s.
UN 1708	6.1	Toluidines, liquid
UN 1709	6.1	2,4-Toluylenediamine, solid (2,4-Toluenediamine)
UN 1710	6.1	Trichloroethylene
UN 1711	6.1	Xylidines, liquid
UN 1712	6.1	Zinc arsenate or Zinc arsenite or Zinc arsenate and zinc arsenite mixtures
UN 1713	6.1	Zinc cyanide
UN 1714	4.3	Zinc phosphide
UN 1715	8	Acetic anhydride
UN 1716	8	Acetyl bromide
UN 1717	3	Acetyl chloride
UN 1718	8	Butyl acid phosphate
UN 1719	8	Caustic alkali liquid, n.o.s.
UN 1720 to 1721	?	(UN No.s no longer in use)
UN 1722	6.1	Allyl chloroformate
UN 1723	3	Allyl iodide
UN 1724	8	Allyltrichlorosilane, stabilized
UN 1725	8	Aluminum bromide, anhydrous
UN 1726	8	Aluminum chloride, anhydrous
UN 1727	8	Ammonium hydrogendifluoride, solid
UN 1728	8	Amyltrichlorosilane
UN 1729	8	Anisoyl chloride
UN 1730	8	Antimony pentachloride, liquid
UN 1731	8	Antimony pentachloride, solution
UN 1732	8	Antimony pentafluoride
UN 1733	8	Antimony trichloride
UN 1734 to 1735	?	(UN No.s no longer in use)
UN 1736	8	Benzoyl chloride
UN 1737	6.1	Benzyl bromide
UN 1738	6.1	Benzyl chloride or Benzyl chloride unstabilized
UN 1739	8	Benzyl chloroformate
UN 1740	8	Hydrogen difluorides, n.o.s. solid
UN 1741	2.3	Boron trichloride
UN 1742	8	Boron trifluoride acetic acid complex
UN 1743	8	Boron trifluoride propionic acid complex
UN 1744	8	Bromine or Bromine solutions
UN 1745	5.1	Bromine pentafluoride
UN 1746	5.1	Bromine trifluoride
UN 1747	8	Butyltrichlorosilane
UN 1748	5.1	Calcium hypochlorite, dry or Calcium hypochlorite mixtures dry with more than 39 percent available chlorine (8.8 percent available oxygen)
UN 1749	2.3	Chlorine trifluoride
UN 1750	6.1	Chloroacetic acid, solution
UN 1751	6.1	Chloroacetic acid, solid
UN 1752	6.1	Chloroacetyl chloride
UN 1753	8	Chlorophenyltrichlorosilane
UN 1754	8	Chlorosulfonic acid (with or without sulfur trioxide)
UN 1755	8	Chromic acid solution
UN 1756	8	Chromic fluoride, solid
UN 1757	8	Chromic fluoride, solution
UN 1758	8	Chromium oxychloride
UN 1759	8	Corrosive solids, n.o.s.
UN 1760	8	Corrosive liquids, n.o.s.
UN 1761	8	Cupriethylenediamine solution
UN 1762	8	Cyclohexenyltrichlorosilane
UN 1763	8	Cyclohexyltrichlorosilane
UN 1764	8	Dichloroacetic acid
UN 1765	8	Dichloroacetyl chloride
UN 1766	8	Dichlorophenyltrichlorosilane
UN 1767	8	Diethyldichlorosilane
UN 1768	8	Difluorophosphoric acid, anhydrous
UN 1769	8	Diphenyldichlorosilane
UN 1770	8	Diphenylmethyl bromide
UN 1771	8	Dodecyltrichlorosilane
UN 1772	?	(UN No. no longer in use)
UN 1773	8	Ferric chloride, anhydrous
UN 1774	8	Fire extinguisher charges, corrosive liquid
UN 1775	8	Fluoroboric acid
UN 1776	8	Fluorophosphoric acid anhydrous
UN 1777	8	Fluorosulfonic acid
UN 1778	8	Fluorosilicic acid
UN 1779	8	Formic acid
UN 1780	8	Fumaryl chloride
UN 1781	8	Hexadecyltrichlorosilane
UN 1782	8	Hexafluorophosphoric acid
UN 1783	8	Hexamethylenediamine solution
UN 1784	8	Hexyltrichlorosilane
UN 1785	?	(UN No. no longer in use)
UN 1786	8	Hydrofluoric acid and Sulfuric acid mixtures
UN 1787	8	Hydriodic acid
UN 1788	8	Hydrobromic acid, with more than 49 percent hydrobromic acid or Hydrobromic acid, with not more than 49 percent hydrobromic acid
UN 1789	8	Hydrochloric acid
UN 1790	8	Hydrofluoric acid, with more than 60 percent strength or Hydrofluoric acid, with not more than 60 percent strength
UN 1791	8	Hypochlorite solutions
UN 1792	8	Iodine monochloride, solid
UN 1793	8	Isopropyl acid phosphate
UN 1794	8	Lead sulfate with more than 3 percent free acid
UN 1795	?	(UN No. no longer in use)
UN 1796	8	Nitrating acid mixtures, with more than 50 percent nitric acid or Nitrating acid mixtures, with not more than 50 percent nitric acid
UN 1797	?	(UN No. no longer in use)
UN 1798	8	Nitrohydrochloric acid
UN 1799	8	Nonyltrichlorosilane
UN 1800	8	Octadecyltrichlorosilane

n.o.s. = not otherwise specified meaning a collective entry to which substances, mixtures, solutions or articles may be assigned if a) they are not mentioned by name in 3.2 Dangerous Goods List AND b) they exhibit chemical, physical and/or dangerous properties corresponding to the Class, classification code, packing group and the name and description of the n.o.s. entry

== See also ==
- Lists of UN numbers
