= List of UN numbers 1201 to 1300 =

UN numbers from UN1201 to UN1300 as assigned by the United Nations Committee of Experts on the Transport of Dangerous Goods are as follows:

== UN 1201 to UN 1300 ==
UN Number	Class	Proper Shipping Name
UN 1201	3	Fusel oil
UN 1202	3	Gas oil or diesel fuel or heating oil, light
UN 1203	3	Gasoline or petrol or motor spirit
UN 1204	3	Nitroglycerin, solution in alcohol, with not more than 1 percent nitroglycerin
UN 1205	?	(UN No. no longer in use)
UN 1206	3	Heptanes
UN 1207	3	Hexaldehyde
UN 1208	3	Hexanes
UN 1209	?	(UN No. no longer in use)
UN 1210	3	Printing ink, flammable or Printing ink related material (including printing ink thinning or reducing compound), flammable
UN 1211	?	(UN No. no longer in use)
UN 1212	3	Isobutanol or isobutyl alcohol
UN 1213	3	Isobutyl acetate
UN 1214	3	Isobutylamine
UN 1215	?	(UN No. no longer in use)
UN 1216	3	Isooctenes
UN 1217	?	(UN No. no longer in use)
UN 1218	3	Isoprene, inhibited
UN 1219	3	Isopropanol or isopropyl alcohol
UN 1220	3	Isopropyl acetate
UN 1221	3	Isopropylamine
UN 1222	3	Isopropyl nitrate
UN 1223	3	Kerosene
UN 1224	3	Ketones, liquid, n.o.s.
UN 1225	?	(UN No. no longer in use)
UN 1226	?	(UN No. no longer in use) Cigarette lighter or Lighter fluid or Lighter fuels or Lighters (UN No. no longer in use)
UN 1227	?	(UN No. no longer in use)
UN 1228	3	Mercaptans, liquid, flammable, toxic, n.o.s. or mercaptan mixtures, liquid, flammable, toxic, n.o.s.
UN 1229	3	Mesityl oxide
UN 1230	3	Methanol
UN 1231	3	Methyl acetate
UN 1232	?	(UN No. no longer in use) Methyl acetone (UN No. no longer in use)
UN 1233	3	Methylamyl acetate
UN 1234	3	Methylal
UN 1235	3	Methylamine, aqueous solution
UN 1236	?	(UN No. no longer in use)
UN 1237	3	Methyl butyrate
UN 1238	6.1	Methyl chloroformate
UN 1239	6.1	Methyl chloromethyl ether
UN 1240 to 1241	?	(UN No.s no longer in use)
UN 1242	4.3	Methyldichlorosilane
UN 1243	3	Methyl formate
UN 1244	6.1	Methylhydrazine
UN 1245	3	Methyl isobutyl ketone
UN 1246	3	Methyl isopropenyl ketone, inhibited
UN 1247	3	Methyl methacrylate monomer, inhibited
UN 1248	3	Methyl propionate
UN 1249	3	Methyl propyl ketone
UN 1250	3	Methyltrichlorosilane
UN 1251	6.1	Methyl vinyl ketone, stabilized
UN 1252 to 1254	?	(UN No.s no longer in use)
UN 1255	3	(UN No. no longer in use) Naphtha, petroleum (UN No. no longer in use)
UN 1256	3	(UN No. no longer in use) Naphtha, solvent (UN No. no longer in use)
UN 1257	?	(UN No. no longer in use) Casinghead gasoline (natural gasoline) (UN No. no longer in use)
UN 1258	?	(UN No. no longer in use)
UN 1259	6.1	Nickel carbonyl
UN 1260	?	(UN No. no longer in use)
UN 1261	3	Nitromethane
UN 1262	3	Octanes
UN 1263	3	Paint-related materials including paint, lacquer, enamel, stain, shellac solutions, varnish, polish, liquid filler, and liquid lacquer base, or paint related material including paint thinning, drying, removing, or reducing compound
UN 1264	3	Paraldehyde
UN 1265	3	Pentanes
UN 1266	3	Perfumery products with flammable solvents
UN 1267	3	Petroleum crude oil
UN 1268	3	Petroleum distillates, n.o.s. or petroleum products, n.o.s.
UN 1269	?	(UN No. no longer in use)
UN 1270	(3)	(UN No. no longer in use) petroleum fuel, generally used in Australia where mixed refined petroleum products are carried in the same tanker i.e.: petrol/diesel/kerosene/toluene etc. (UN No. no longer in use)
UN 1271	(3)	(UN No. no longer in use) petroleum spirit (UN No. no longer in use)
UN 1272	3	Pine oil
UN 1273	?	(UN No. no longer in use)
UN 1274	3	n-Propanol or propyl alcohol, normal
UN 1275	3	Propionaldehyde
UN 1276	3	n-Propyl acetate
UN 1277	3	Propylamine
UN 1278	3	Propyl chloride
UN 1279	3	1,2-Dichloropropane
UN 1280	3	Propylene oxide
UN 1281	3	Propyl formates
UN 1282	3	Pyridine
UN 1283 to 1285	?	(UN No.s no longer in use)
UN 1286	3	Rosin oil
UN 1287	3	Rubber solution
UN 1288	3	Shale oil
UN 1289	3	Sodium methylate solutions in alcohol
UN 1290 to 1291	?	(UN No.s no longer in use)
UN 1292	3	Tetraethyl silicate
UN 1293	3	Tinctures, medicinal
UN 1294	3	Toluene
UN 1295	4.3	Trichlorosilane
UN 1296	3	Triethylamine
UN 1297	3	Trimethylamine, aqueous solutions with not more than 50 percent trimethylamine by mass
UN 1298	3	Trimethylchlorosilane
UN 1299	3	Turpentine
UN 1300	3	Turpentine substitute or mineral turpentine (Australia)

n.o.s. = not otherwise specified meaning a collective entry to which substances, mixtures, solutions or articles may be assigned if a) they are not mentioned by name in 3.2 Dangerous Goods List AND b) they exhibit chemical, physical and/or dangerous properties corresponding to the Class, classification code, packing group and the name and description of the n.o.s. entry

== See also ==
- Lists of UN numbers
