= OR2C1 =

Protein-coding gene in the species Homo sapiens

Identifiers
- Aliases: OR2C1, OLFmf3, OR2C2P, olfactory receptor family 2 subfamily C member 1
- External IDs: MGI: 106182; GeneCards: OR2C1

Gene location (Human)
Chr.	Chromosome 16 (human)
Band	16p13.3	Start	3,355,889 bp
Band	16p13.3	End	3,357,306 bp

Gene location (Mouse)
Chr.	Chromosome 16 (mouse)
Band	16|16 A1	Start	3,648,742 bp
Band	16|16 A1	End	3,662,611 bp
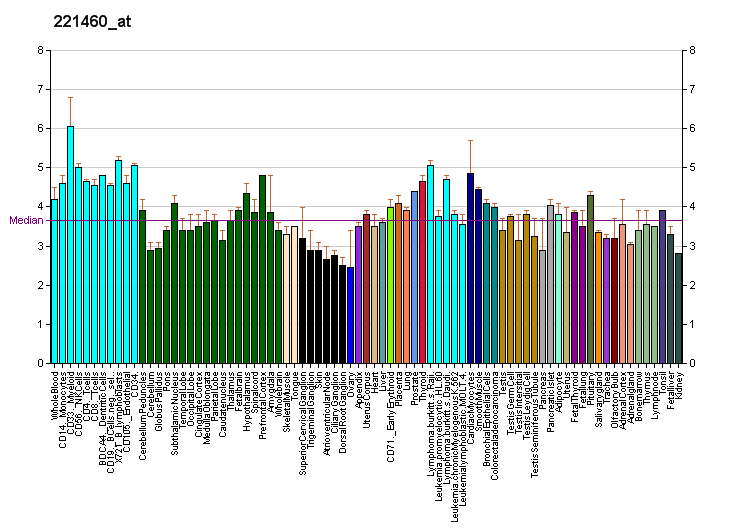
RNA expression pattern
Bgee	Human / Mouse (ortholog); Top expressed in: tibialis anterior muscle; mucosa of ileum; deltoid muscle; ventricular zone; fallopian tube; right uterine tube; lymph node; islet of Langerhans; primary visual cortex; spinal cord / Top expressed in: Jacobson's organ; respiratory epithelium; nasal epithelium; olfactory epithelium; gastrula; CA3 field; skin of abdomen; More reference expression data
BioGPS	More reference expression data
Gene ontology
Molecular function	G protein-coupled receptor activity; signal transducer activity; olfactory receptor activity; odorant binding
Cellular component	integral component of membrane; plasma membrane; membrane; cell cortex
Biological process	signal transduction; response to stimulus; detection of chemical stimulus involved in sensory perception of smell; sensory perception of smell; G protein-coupled receptor signaling pathway; detection of chemical stimulus involved in sensory perception
Sources:Amigo / QuickGO
Orthologs
Databases	NCBI: entry; OMA: entry
Species	Human	Mouse
Entrez	4993	18312
Ensembl	ENSG00000168158	ENSMUSG00000059043
UniProt	O95371	P23275
RefSeq (mRNA)	NM_012368	NM_008762
RefSeq (protein)	NP_036500	NP_032788
Location (UCSC)	Chr 16: 3.36 – 3.36 Mb	Chr 16: 3.65 – 3.66 Mb
PubMed search
- Wikidata
View/Edit Human	View/Edit Mouse

Olfactory receptor 2C1 is a protein that in humans is encoded by the OR2C1 gene.

Olfactory receptors interact with odorant molecules in the nose, to initiate a neuronal response that triggers the perception of a smell. The olfactory receptor proteins are members of a large family of G-protein-coupled receptors (GPCR) arising from single coding-exon genes. Olfactory receptors share a 7-transmembrane domain structure with many neurotransmitter and hormone receptors and are responsible for the recognition and G protein-mediated transduction of odorant signals. The olfactory receptor gene family is the largest in the genome. The nomenclature assigned to the olfactory receptor genes and proteins for this organism is independent of other organisms.

== Ligands ==
- Octanethiol
- Nonanethiol

== See also ==
- Olfactory receptor
