= DEPBT =

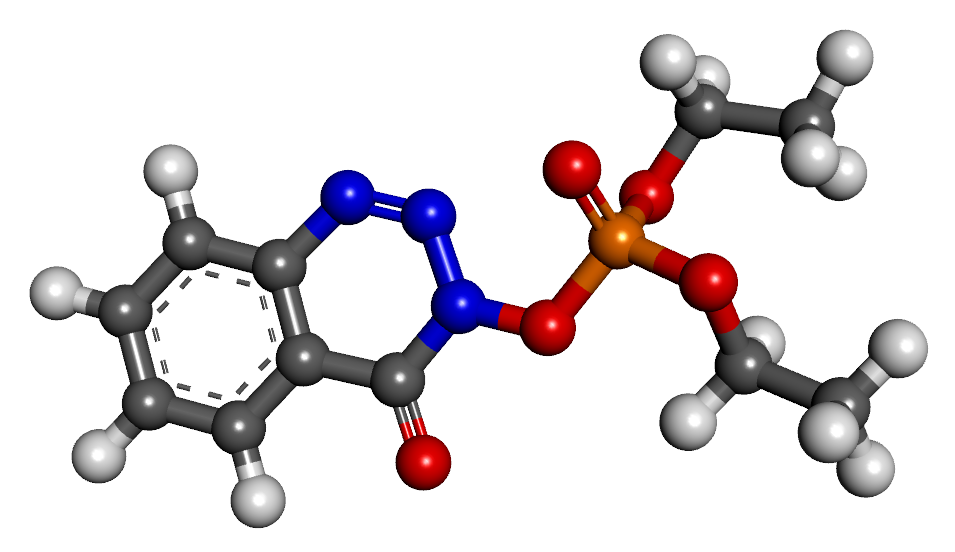

Names
- Preferred IUPAC name Diethyl 4-oxo-1,2,3-benzotriazin-3(4H)-yl phosphate
- Other names DEPBT

Identifiers
CAS Number	165534-43-0
3D model (JSmol)	Interactive image
ChemSpider	3500129
ECHA InfoCard	100.156.337
PubChem CID	4293995
UNII	Z4JZE73XNT
CompTox Dashboard (EPA)	DTXSID10401645
- InChI: InChI=1S/C11H14N3O5P/c1-3-17-20(16,18-4-2)19-14-11(15)9-7-5-6-8-10(9)12-13-14/h5-8H,3-4H2,1-2H3 Key: AJDPNPAGZMZOMN-UHFFFAOYSA-N
- SMILES: CCOP(=O)(OCC)On1c(=O)c2ccccc2nn1

Properties
Chemical formula	C_{11}H_{14}N_{3}O_{5}P
Molar mass	299.22 g/mol
- Except where otherwise noted, data are given for materials in their standard state (at 25 °C [77 °F], 100 kPa). (what is ?) Infobox references

DEPBT (3-(diethoxyphosphoryloxy)-1,2,3-benzotriazin-4(3H)-one) is a peptide coupling reagent used in peptide synthesis. It shows remarkable resistance to racemization.

Fmoc-Dab(Mtt)-OH, a commercially available amino acid building block for solid-phase peptide synthesis (SPPS), was proven to undergo rapid lactamization, instead of reacting with the N-terminal end of the peptide. Compared with other commercially available coupling reagents, DEPBT has shown superior performance in coupling Fmoc-Dab(Mtt)-OH to the N-terminal end of peptide during SPPS, though the approach was regarded as 'costly and tedious'.

== See also ==
- BOP
- PyBOP
