= List of UN numbers 2701 to 2800 =

UN numbers from UN2701 to UN2800 as assigned by the United Nations Committee of Experts on the Transport of Dangerous Goods are as follows:

== UN 2701 to UN 2800 ==
UN Number	Class	Proper Shipping Name
UN 2701 to 2702	?	(UN No.s no longer in use)
UN 2703	?	(UN No. no longer in use) Isopropyl mercaptan (UN No. no longer in use)
UN 2704	?	(UN No. no longer in use) Propyl mercaptan (UN No. no longer in use)
UN 2705	8	1-Pentol aka (2E)-3-Methyl-2-penten-4-yn-1-ol
UN 2706	?	(UN No. no longer in use) Diethylcarbinol (UN No. longer in use)
UN 2707	3	Dimethyldioxanes
UN 2708	?	(UN No. no longer in use) Butoxyl (UN No. no longer in use)
UN 2709	3	Butyl benzenes
UN 2710	3	Dipropyl ketone
UN 2711	?	(UN No. no longer in use) Dibromobenzene (UN No. no longer in use)
UN 2712	?	(UN No. no longer in use)
UN 2713	6.1	Acridine
UN 2714	4.1	Zinc resinate
UN 2715	4.1	Aluminum resinate
UN 2716	6.1	1,4-Butynediol
UN 2717	4.1	Camphor, synthetic
UN 2718	?	(UN No. no longer in use) Tripropylaluminum (UN No. no longer in use)
UN 2719	5.1	Barium bromate
UN 2720	5.1	Chromium nitrate
UN 2721	5.1	Copper chlorate
UN 2722	5.1	Lithium nitrate
UN 2723	5.1	Magnesium chlorate
UN 2724	5.1	Manganese nitrate
UN 2725	5.1	Nickel nitrate
UN 2726	5.1	Nickel nitrite
UN 2727	6.1	Thallium nitrate
UN 2728	5.1	Zirconium nitrate
UN 2729	6.1	Hexachlorobenzene
UN 2730	6.1	Nitroanisole
UN 2731	?	(UN No. no longer in use)
UN 2732	6.1	Nitrobromobenzenes liquid or Nitrobromobenzenes solid
UN 2733	3	Amines, flammable, corrosive, n.o.s. or Polyamines, flammable, corrosive, n.o.s.
UN 2734	8	Amines, liquid, corrosive, flammable, n.o.s. or Polyamines, liquid, corrosive, flammable, n.o.s.
UN 2735	8	Amines, liquid, corrosive, n.o.s. or Polyamines, liquid, corrosive, n.o.s.
UN 2736	?	(UN No. no longer in use)
UN 2737	?	(UN No. no longer in use) Bis-aminopropylamine (UN No. no longer in use)
UN 2738	6.1	N-Butylaniline
UN 2739	8.1	Butyric anhydride
UN 2740	6.1	n-Propyl chloroformate
UN 2741	5.1	Barium hypochlorite with more than 22 percent available chlorine
UN 2742	6.1	Chloroformates, toxic, corrosive, flammable, n.o.s.
UN 2743	6.1	n-Butyl chloroformate
UN 2744	6.1	Cyclobutyl chloroformate
UN 2745	6.1	Chloromethyl chloroformate
UN 2746	6.1	Phenyl chloroformate
UN 2747	6.1	tert-Butylcyclohexylchloroformate
UN 2748	6.1	2-Ethylhexyl chloroformate
UN 2749	3	Tetramethylsilane
UN 2750	6.1	1,3-Dichloropropan-2-ol
UN 2751	8	Diethylthiophosphoryl chloride
UN 2752	3	1,2-Epoxy-3-ethoxypropane
UN 2753	6.1	N-Ethylbenzyltoluidines liquid or N-Ethylbenzyltoluidines solid
UN 2754	6.1	N-Ethyltoluidines
UN 2755	?	(UN No. no longer in use) 3-Chloroperoxybenzoic acid (UN No. no longer in use)
UN 2756	?	(UN No. no longer in use) Organic peroxides, mixture (UN No. no longer in use)
UN 2757	6.1	Carbamate pesticides, solid, toxic
UN 2758	3	Carbamate pesticides, liquid, flammable, toxic, flashpoint less than 23 °C
UN 2759	6.1	Arsenical pesticides, solid, toxic
UN 2760	3	Arsenical pesticides, liquid, flammable, toxic, flashpoint less than 23 °C
UN 2761	6.1	Organochlorine pesticides, solid, toxic
UN 2762	3	Organochlorine pesticides liquid, flammable, toxic, flashpoint less than 23 °C
UN 2763	6.1	Triazine pesticides, solid, toxic
UN 2764	3	Triazine pesticides, liquid, flammable, toxic, flashpoint less than 23 °C
UN 2765	?	(UN No. no longer in use) Phenoxy pesticides, solid, toxic, n.o.s. (UN No. no longer in use)
UN 2766	?	(UN No. no longer in use) Phenoxy pesticides, liquid, flammable, toxic, n.o.s. (UN No. no longer in use)
UN 2767	?	(UN No. no longer in use) Phenylurea pesticides, solid, toxic, n.o.s. (UN No. no longer in use)
UN 2768	?	(UN No. no longer in use) Phenylurea pesticides, liquid, flammable, toxic, n.o.s. (UN No. no longer in use)
UN 2769	?	(UN No. no longer in use) Benzoic derivative pesticides, solid, toxic, n.o.s. (UN No. no longer in use)
UN 2770	?	(UN No. no longer in use) Benzoic derivative pesticides, liquid, flammable, toxic, n.o.s. (UN No. no longer in use)
UN 2771	6.1	Thiocarbamate pesticides, solid, toxic
UN 2772	3	Thiocarbamate pesticide, liquid, flammable, toxic, flashpoint less than 23 °C
UN 2773	?	(UN No. no longer in use) Phthalimide derivative pesticides, solid, toxic, n.o.s. (UN No. no longer in use)
UN 2774	?	(UN No. no longer in use) Phthalimide derivative pesticides, liquid, flammable, toxic, n.o.s. (UN No. no longer in use)
UN 2775	6.1	Copper based pesticides, solid, toxic
UN 2776	3	Copper based pesticides, liquid, flammable, toxic, flashpoint less than 23 °C
UN 2777	6.1	Mercury based pesticides, solid, toxic
UN 2778	3	Mercury based pesticides, liquid, flammable, toxic, flashpoint less than 23 °C
UN 2779	6.1	Substituted nitrophenol pesticides, solid, toxic
UN 2780	3	Substituted nitrophenol pesticides, liquid, flammable, toxic, flashpoint less than 23 °C
UN 2781	6.1	Bipyridilium pesticides, solid, toxic
UN 2782	3	Bipyridilium pesticides, liquid, flammable, toxic, flashpoint less than 23 °C
UN 2783	6.1	Organophosphorus pesticides, solid, toxic
UN 2784	3	Organophosphorus pesticides, liquid, flammable, toxic, flashpoint less than 23 °C
UN 2785	6.1	4-Thiapentanal
UN 2786	6.1	Organotin pesticides, solid, toxic
UN 2787	3	Organotin pesticides, liquid, flammable, toxic, flashpoint less than 23 °C
UN 2788	6.1	Organotin compounds, liquid, n.o.s.
UN 2789	8	Acetic acid, glacial or Acetic acid solution, with more than 80 percent acid, by mass
UN 2790	8	Acetic acid solution, not less than 50 percent but not more than 80 percent acid, by mass or Acetic acid solution, with more than 10 percent and less than 50 percent acid, by mass
UN 2791	?	(UN No. no longer in use) Aircraft thrust device (UN No. no longer in use)
UN 2792	?	(UN No. no longer in use) Aircraft rocket engine igniter (UN No. no longer in use)
UN 2793	4.2	Ferrous metal borings or Ferrous metal shavings or Ferrous metal turnings or Ferrous metal cuttings in a form liable to self-heating
UN 2794	8	Batteries, wet, filled with acid, electric storage
UN 2795	8	Batteries, wet, filled with alkali, electric storage
UN 2796	8	Battery fluid, acid or Sulfuric acid with not more than 51 percent acid
UN 2797	8	Battery fluid, alkali
UN 2798	8	Phenylphosphorus Dichloride
UN 2799	8	Phenylphosphorus Thiodichloride
UN 2800	8	Batteries, wet, non-spillable, electric storage

== See also ==
- Lists of UN numbers
