= List of UN numbers 3201 to 3300 =

UN numbers from UN3201 to UN3300 as assigned by the United Nations Sub-Committee of Experts on the Transport of Dangerous Goods are as follows:

== UN 3201 to UN 3300 ==
UN Number	Class	Proper Shipping Name
UN 3201	?	(UN number no longer in use)
UN 3202	?	(UN number no longer in use)
UN 3203	(4.2)	(UN number no longer in use) Pyrophoric organometallic compound, water-reactive, n.o.s. (UN number no longer in use)
UN 3204	?	(UN number no longer in use)
UN 3205	4.2	Alkaline earth metal alcoholates, n.o.s.
UN 3206	4.2	Alkali metal alcoholates, self-heating, corrosive, n.o.s.
UN 3207	(4.3)	(UN number no longer in use) Organometallic compound or Compound solution or Compound dispersion, water-reactive, flammable, n.o.s. (UN number no longer in use)
UN 3208	4.3	Metallic substance, water-reactive, n.o.s.
UN 3209	4.3	Metallic substance, water-reactive, self-heating, n.o.s.
UN 3210	5.1	Chlorates, inorganic, aqueous solutions, n.o.s.
UN 3211	5.1	Perchlorates, inorganic, aqueous solution, n.o.s.
UN 3212	5.1	Hypochlorites, inorganic, n.o.s.
UN 3213	5.1	Bromates, inorganic, aqueous solution, n.o.s.
UN 3214	5.1	Permanganates, inorganic, aqueous solution, n.o.s.
UN 3215	5.1	Persulfates, inorganic, n.o.s.
UN 3216	5.1	Persulfates, inorganic, aqueous solution, n.o.s.
UN 3217	?	(UN number no longer in use) Percarbonates, inorganic, n.o.s. (UN number no longer in use)
UN 3218	5.1	Nitrates, inorganic, aqueous solution, n.o.s.
UN 3219	5.1	Nitrites, inorganic, aqueous solution, n.o.s.
UN 3220	2.2	Pentafluoroethane or Refrigerant gas R 125
UN 3221	4.1	Self-reactive liquid type B
UN 3222	4.1	Self-reactive solid type B
UN 3223	4.1	Self-reactive liquid type C
UN 3224	4.1	Self-reactive solid type C
UN 3225	4.1	Self-reactive liquid type D
UN 3226	4.1	Self-reactive solid type D
UN 3227	4.1	Self-reactive liquid type E
UN 3228	4.1	Self-reactive solid type E
UN 3229	4.1	Self-reactive liquid type F
UN 3230	4.1	Self-reactive solid type F
UN 3231	4.1	Self-reactive liquid type B, temperature controlled
UN 3232	4.1	Self-reactive solid type B, temperature controlled
UN 3233	4.1	Self-reactive liquid type C, temperature controlled
UN 3234	4.1	Self-reactive solid type C, temperature controlled
UN 3235	4.1	Self-reactive liquid type D, temperature controlled
UN 3236	4.1	Self-reactive solid type D, temperature controlled
UN 3237	4.1	Self-reactive liquid type E, temperature controlled
UN 3238	4.1	Self-reactive solid type E, temperature controlled
UN 3239	4.1	Self-reactive liquid type F, temperature controlled
UN 3240	4.1	Self-reactive solid type F, temperature controlled
UN 3241	4.1	2-Bromo-2-nitropropane-1,3-diol
UN 3242	4.1	Azodicarbonamide
UN 3243	6.1	Solids containing toxic liquid, n.o.s.
UN 3244	8	Solids containing corrosive liquid, n.o.s.
UN 3245	9	Genetically modified microorganisms or Genetically modified organisms
UN 3246	6.1	Methanesulfonyl chloride
UN 3247	5.1	Sodium peroxoborate, anhydrous,
UN 3248	3	Medicine, liquid, flammable, toxic, n.o.s.
UN 3249	6.1	Medicine, solid, toxic, n.o.s.
UN 3250	6.1	Chloroacetic acid, molten
UN 3251	4.1	Isosorbide-5-mononitrate
UN 3252	2.1	Difluoromethane or Refrigerant gas R 32
UN 3253	8	Disodium trioxosilicate
UN 3254	4.2	Tributylphosphane
UN 3255	4.2	tert-Butyl hypochlorite
UN 3256	3	Elevated temperature liquid, flammable, n.o.s., with flashpoint above 60 °C, at or above its flashpoint
UN 3257	9	Elevated temperature liquid, n.o.s., at or above 100 °C and below its flashpoint (including molten metals, molten salts, etc.)
UN 3258	9	Elevated temperature solid, n.o.s., at or above 240 °C, see 49 CFR 173.247(h)(4)
UN 3259	8	Amines, solid, corrosive, n.o.s. or Polyamines, solid, corrosive, n.o.s.
UN 3260	8	Corrosive solid, acidic, inorganic, n.o.s.
UN 3261	8	Corrosive solid, acidic, organic, n.o.s.
UN 3262	8	Corrosive solid, basic, inorganic, n.o.s.
UN 3263	8	Corrosive solid, basic, organic, n.o.s.
UN 3264	8	Corrosive liquid, acidic, inorganic, n.o.s.
UN 3265	8	Corrosive liquid, acidic, organic, n.o.s.
UN 3266	8	Corrosive liquid, basic, inorganic, n.o.s.
UN 3267	8	Corrosive liquid, basic, organic, n.o.s.
UN 3268	9	Safety devices electrically initiated
UN 3269	3	Polyester resin kit
UN 3270	4.1	Nitrocellulose membrane filters
UN 3271	3	Ethers, n.o.s.
UN 3272	3	Esters, n.o.s.
UN 3273	3	Nitriles, flammable, toxic, n.o.s.
UN 3274	3	Alcoholates solution, n.o.s., in alcohol
UN 3275	6.1	Nitriles, toxic, flammable, n.o.s.
UN 3276	6.1	Nitriles, toxic, liquid, n.o.s.
UN 3277	6.1	Chloroformates, toxic, corrosive, n.o.s.
UN 3278	6.1	Organophosphorus compound, toxic, liquid, n.o.s.
UN 3279	6.1	Organophosphorus compound, toxic, flammable, n.o.s.
UN 3280	6.1	Organoarsenic compound, n.o.s.
UN 3281	6.1	Metal carbonyls, liquid, n.o.s.
UN 3282	6.1	Organometallic compound, toxic, liquid, n.o.s.
UN 3283	6.1	Selenium compound, solid, n.o.s.
UN 3284	6.1	Tellurium compound, solid, n.o.s.
UN 3285	6.1	Vanadium compound, n.o.s.
UN 3286	3	Flammable liquid, toxic, corrosive, n.o.s.
UN 3287	6.1	Toxic liquid, inorganic, n.o.s. or Toxic liquid, inorganic, n.o.s. Inhalation Hazard, Packing Group I, Zone A or B
UN 3288	6.1	Toxic solid, inorganic, n.o.s.
UN 3289	6.1	Toxic liquid, corrosive, inorganic, n.o.s. or Toxic liquid, corrosive, inorganic, n.o.s. Inhalation Hazard, Packing Group I, Zone A or B
UN 3290	6.1	Toxic solid, corrosive, inorganic, n.o.s.
UN 3291	6.2	Clinical waste, unspecified, n.o.s. or (Bio)medical waste, n.o.s. or Regulated medical waste, n.o.s
UN 3292	4.3	Batteries, containing sodium or Cells, containing sodium
UN 3293	6.1	Hydrazine, aqueous solution with not more than 37 percent hydrazine, by mass
UN 3294	6.1	Hydrogen cyanide, solution in alcohol with not more than 45 percent hydrogen cyanide
UN 3295	3	Hydrocarbons, liquid, n.o.s.
UN 3296	2.2	Heptafluoropropane or Refrigerant gas R 227
UN 3297	2.2	Ethylene oxide and chlorotetrafluoroethane mixture with not more than 8.8 percent ethylene oxide
UN 3298	2.2	Ethylene oxide and pentafluoroethane mixture with not more than 7.9 percent ethylene oxide
UN 3299	2.2	Ethylene oxide and tetrafluoroethane mixture with not more than 5.6 percent ethylene oxide
UN 3300	2.3	Ethylene oxide and carbon dioxide mixture with more than 87 percent ethylene oxide

== See also ==
- Dangerous goods – Substances harmful to people, property or the environment
- Lists of UN numbers
