= List of UN numbers 0501 to 0600 =

UN numbers from UN0501 to UN0600 as assigned by the United Nations Committee of Experts on the Transport of Dangerous Goods are as follows:

== UN 0501 to UN 0600 ==
UN Number	Class	Proper Shipping Name
UN 0501	1.4C	Propellant, solid
UN 0502	1.2C	Rockets, with inert head
UN 0503	1.4G	Safety devices, pyrotechnic
UN 0504	1.1D	1H-Tetrazole
UN 0505	1.4G	Signals, distress, ship
UN 0506	1.4S	Signals, distress, ship
UN 0507	1.4S	Signals, smoke
UN 0508	1.3C	1-Hydroxybenzotriazole, anhydrous, dry or wetted with less than 20% water, by mass
UN 0509	1.4C	Powder, smokeless
UN 0510	1.4C	Rocket motors
UN 0511	1.1B	Detonators, electronic, programmable for blasting
UN 0512	1.4B	Detonators, electronic, programmable for blasting
UN 0513	1.4S	Detonators, electronic, programmable for blasting
UN 0514	1.4S	Fire suppressant dispersing devices†
UN 0515 to 0600	?	(UN No.s not yet in use)

== See also ==
- Lists of UN numbers
