= List of UN numbers 3501 to 3600 =

UN numbers from UN3501 to UN3600 as assigned by the United Nations Committee of Experts on the Transport of Dangerous Goods are as follows:

== UN 3501 to UN 3600 ==
UN Number	Class	Proper Shipping Name
UN 3501	2.1	Chemical under pressure, flammable, not otherwise specified
UN 3502	2.2	Chemical under pressure, toxic, not otherwise specified
UN 3503	2.2	Chemical under pressure, corrosive, not otherwise specified
UN 3504	2.1	Chemical under pressure, flammable, toxic, not otherwise specified
UN 3505	2.1	Chemical under pressure, flammable, corrosive, not otherwise specified
UN 3506	8	Mercury contained in manufactured articles
UN 3507	6.1	Uranium hexafluoride, radioactive material, excepted package, less than 0.1 kg per package, non-fissile or fissile excepted
UN 3508	9	Capacitor, asymmetric, electric double layer (with an energy storage capacity greater than 0.3 Wh)
UN 3509	9	Packaging, discarded, empty, uncleaned
UN 3510	2.1	Adsorbed gas, flammable, not otherwise specified
UN 3511	2.2	Adsorbed gas, not otherwise specified
UN 3512	2.3	Adsorbed gas, toxic, not otherwise specified
UN 3513	2.2	Adsorbed gas, oxidizing, not otherwise specified
UN 3514	2.3	Adsorbed gas, toxic, flammable, not otherwise specified
UN 3515	2.3	Adsorbed gas, toxic, oxidizing, not otherwise specified
UN 3516	2.3	Adsorbed gas, toxic, corrosive, not otherwise specified
UN 3517	2.3	Adsorbed gas, toxic, flammable, corrosive, not otherwise specified
UN 3518	2.3	Adsorbed gas, toxic, oxidizing, corrosive, not otherwise specified
UN 3519	2.3	Boron trifluoride, adsorbed
UN 3520	2.3	Chlorine, adsorbed
UN 3521	2.3	Silicon tetrafluoride, adsorbed
UN 3522	2.3	Arsine, adsorbed
UN 3523	2.3	Germane, adsorbed
UN 3524	2.3	Phosphorus pentafluoride, adsorbed
UN 3525	2.3	Phosphine, adsorbed
UN 3526	2.3	Hydrogen selenide, adsorbed
UN 3527	4.1	Polyester resin kit, solid base material
UN 3528	3	Engine, internal combustion, flammable liquid powered or engine, fuel cell, flammable liquid powered or machinery, internal combustion, flammable liquid powered or machinery, fuel cell, flammable liquid powered
UN 3529	2.1	Engine, internal combustion, flammable gas powered or engine, fuel cell, flammable gas powered or machinery, internal combustion, flammable gas powered or machinery, fuel cell, flammable gas powered
UN 3530	9	Engine, internal combustion or machinery, internal combustion
UN 3531	4.1	Polymerizing substance, solid, stabilized, not otherwise specified
UN 3532	4.1	Polymerizing substance, liquid, stabilized, not otherwise specified
UN 3533	4.1	Polymerizing substance, solid, stabilized, temperature controlled, not otherwise specified
UN 3534	4.1	Polymerizing substance, liquid, stabilized, temperature controlled, not otherwise specified
UN 3535	6.1	Toxic solid, flammable, inorganic, not otherwise specified
UN 3536	9	Lithium batteries installed in cargo transport unit lithium ion batteries or lithium metal batteries
UN 3537	2.1	Articles containing flammable gas, not otherwise specified
UN 3538	2.2	Articles containing non-flammable, non toxic gas, not otherwise specified
UN 3539	2.3	Articles containing toxic gas, not otherwise specified
UN 3540	3	Articles containing flammable liquid, not otherwise specified
UN 3541	4.1	Articles containing flammable solid, not otherwise specified
UN 3542	4.2	Articles containing a substance liable to spontaneous combustion, not otherwise specified
UN 3543	4.3	Articles containing a substance which emits flammable gas in contact with water, not otherwise specified
UN 3544	5.1	Articles containing oxidizing substance, not otherwise specified
UN 3545	5.2	Articles containing organic peroxide, not otherwise specified
UN 3546	6.1	Articles containing toxic substance, not otherwise specified
UN 3547	8	Articles containing corrosive substance, not otherwise specified
UN 3548	9	Articles containing miscellaneous dangerous goods, not otherwise specified
UN 3549	6.2	Medical waste, category A, affecting humans, solid or Medical waste, category A, affecting animals only, solid
UN 3550	6.1	Cobalt dihydroxide powder, containing not less than 10 % respirable particles
UN 3551	9	Sodium ion batteries with organic electrolyte
UN 3552	9	Sodium ion batteries contained in equipment or sodium ion batteries packed with equipment, with organic electrolyte
UN 3553	2.1	Disilane
UN 3554	8	Gallium contained in manufactured articles
UN 3555	3	Trifluoromethyltetrazole-sodium salt in acetone, with not less than 68 % acetone, by mass
UN 3556	9	Vehicle, lithium-ion battery powered
UN 3557	9	Vehicle, lithium metal battery powered
UN 3558	9	Vehicle, sodium ion battery powered
UN 3559	9	Fire suppressant dispersing devices†
UN 3560	6.1	Tetramethylammonium hydroxide aqueous solution with not less than 25 % tetramethylammonium hydroxide
UN 3561 to 3600	-	(UN No.s not yet in use)

== See also ==
- Lists of UN numbers
