= Lists of UN numbers =

Danger code: 30 for Flammable liquids; 33 for very Flammable liquids, with its 4 digits UN number (see below)

The UN numbers range from UN0001 to about UN3600 and are assigned by the United Nations Committee of Experts on the Transport of Dangerous Goods. Each number is associated with the dangerous goods class and proper shipping name for the material or type of goods.

== UN 0001 to 0600 ==
- List of UN numbers 0001 to 0100
- List of UN numbers 0101 to 0200
- List of UN numbers 0201 to 0300
- List of UN numbers 0301 to 0400
- List of UN numbers 0401 to 0500
- List of UN numbers 0501 to 0600

== UN 1000 to 2000 ==
- List of UN numbers 1001 to 1100
- List of UN numbers 1101 to 1200
- List of UN numbers 1201 to 1300
- List of UN numbers 1301 to 1400
- List of UN numbers 1401 to 1500
- List of UN numbers 1501 to 1600
- List of UN numbers 1601 to 1700
- List of UN numbers 1701 to 1800
- List of UN numbers 1801 to 1900
- List of UN numbers 1901 to 2000

== UN 2001 to 3000 ==
- List of UN numbers 2001 to 2100
- List of UN numbers 2101 to 2200
- List of UN numbers 2201 to 2300
- List of UN numbers 2301 to 2400
- List of UN numbers 2401 to 2500
- List of UN numbers 2501 to 2600
- List of UN numbers 2601 to 2700
- List of UN numbers 2701 to 2800
- List of UN numbers 2801 to 2900
- List of UN numbers 2901 to 3000

== UN 3001 and above ==
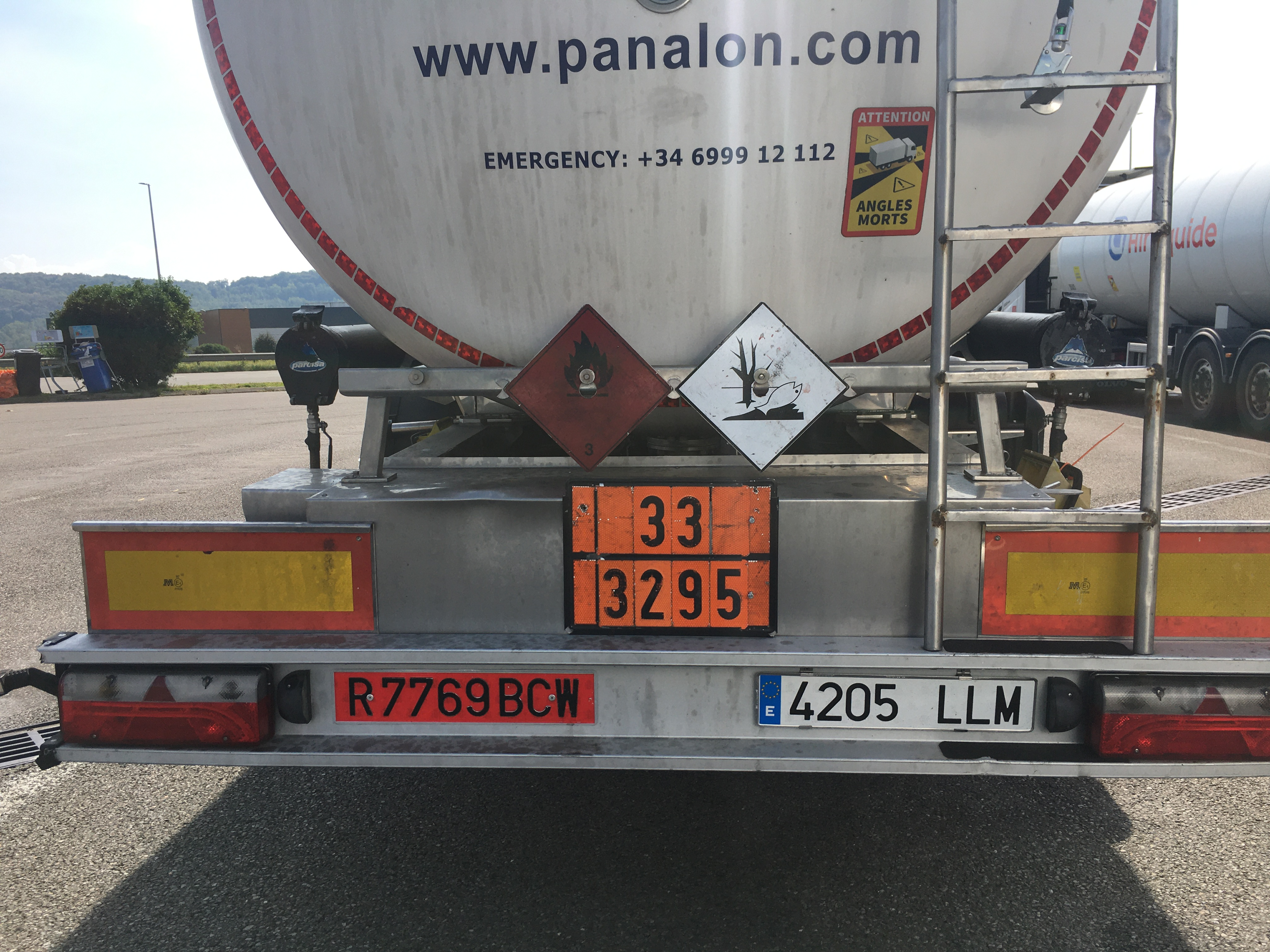
Vehicle from Spain, with UN code 3295

- List of UN numbers 3001 to 3100
- List of UN numbers 3101 to 3200
- List of UN numbers 3201 to 3300
- List of UN numbers 3301 to 3400
- List of UN numbers 3401 to 3500
- List of UN numbers 3501 to 3600
