= List of UN numbers 2201 to 2300 =

UN numbers from UN2201 to UN2300 as assigned by the United Nations Committee of Experts on the Transport of Dangerous Goods are as follows:

== UN 2201 to UN 2300 ==
UN Number	Class	Proper Shipping Name
UN 2201	2	Nitrous oxide, refrigerated liquid
UN 2202	2	Hydrogen selenide, anhydrous
UN 2203	2	Silane, compressed
UN 2204	2	Carbonyl sulfide
UN 2205	6.1	Adiponitrile
UN 2206	6.1	Isocyanates, toxic, n.o.s. or Isocyanate solutions, toxic, n.o.s. flashpoint more than 61 °C and boiling point less than 300 °C
UN 2207	?	(UN No. no longer in use) Isocyanates, n.o.s. or Isocyanate solutions, n.o.s. (UN No. no longer in use)
UN 2208	5.1	Calcium hypochlorite mixtures, dry, with more than 10 percent but not more than 39 percent available chlorine
UN 2209	8	Formaldehyde, solutions, with not less than 25 percent formaldehyde
UN 2210	4.2	Maneb or Maneb preparations with not less than 60 percent maneb
UN 2211	9	Polymeric beads, expandable, evolving flammable vapor
UN 2212	9	Blue asbestos (Crocidolite) or Brown asbestos (amosite, mysorite)
UN 2213	4.1	Paraformaldehyde
UN 2214	8	Phthalic anhydride with more than .05 percent maleic anhydride
UN 2215	8	Maleic anhydride
UN 2216	9	Fish meal, stabilized or Fish scrap, stabilized
UN 2217	4.2	Seed cake with not more than 1.5 percent oil and not more than 11 percent moisture
UN 2218	8	Acrylic acid, inhibited
UN 2219	3	Allyl glycidyl ether
UN 2220	?	(UN No. no longer in use) Aluminium alkyl halides, in solution (UN No. no longer in use)
UN 2221	?	(UN No. no longer in use) Aluminium alkyl halides, pure (UN No. no longer in use)
UN 2222	3	Anisole
UN 2223	?	(UN No. no longer in use)
UN 2224	6.1	Benzonitrile
UN 2225	8	Benzenesulfonyl chloride
UN 2226	8	Benzotrichloride
UN 2227	3	n-Butyl methacrylate, inhibited
UN 2228	?	(UN No. no longer in use) Butylphenols, liquid (UN No. no longer in use)
UN 2229	?	(UN No. no longer in use) Butylphenols, solid (UN No. no longer in use)
UN 2230	?	(UN No. no longer in use) Chlorinated anthracene oil (UN No. no longer in use)
UN 2231	?	(UN No. no longer in use)
UN 2232	6.1	2-Chloroethanal
UN 2233	6.1	Chloroanisidines
UN 2234	3	Chlorobenzotrifluorides
UN 2235	6.1	Chlorobenzyl chlorides, liquid
UN 2236	6.1	3-Chloro-4-methylphenyl isocyanate
UN 2237	6.1	Chloronitroanilines
UN 2238	3	Chlorotoluenes
UN 2239	6.1	Chlorotoluidines, solid
UN 2240	8	Chromosulfuric acid
UN 2241	3	Cycloheptane
UN 2242	3	Cycloheptene
UN 2243	3	Cyclohexyl acetate
UN 2244	3	Cyclopentanol
UN 2245	3	Cyclopentanone
UN 2246	3	Cyclopentene
UN 2247	3	n-Decane
UN 2248	8	Di-n-butylamine
UN 2249	6.1	Dichlorodimethyl ether, symmetrical
UN 2250	6.1	Dichlorophenyl isocyanates
UN 2251	3	Bicyclo [2,2,1] hepta-2, 5-diene, inhibited or 2,5-Norbornadiene, inhibited
UN 2252	3	1,2-Dimethoxyethane
UN 2253	6.1	N,N-Dimethylaniline
UN 2254	4.1	Matches, Fusee
UN 2255	?	(UN No. no longer in use) Organic peroxides, sample, n.o.s. (UN No. no longer in use)
UN 2256	3	Cyclohexene
UN 2257	4.3	Potassium
UN 2258	8	1,2-Propylenediamine
UN 2259	8	Triethylenetetramine
UN 2260	3	Tripropylamine
UN 2261	6.1	Xylenols
UN 2262	8	Dimethylcarbamoyl chloride
UN 2263	3	Dimethylcyclohexanes
UN 2264	8	Dimethylcyclohexylamine
UN 2265	3	N,N-Dimethylformamide
UN 2266	3	Dimethyl-N-propylamine
UN 2267	6.1	Dimethyl thiophosphoryl chloride
UN 2268	?	(UN No. no longer in use)
UN 2269	8	3,3'-Iminodipropylamine
UN 2270	3	Ethylamine, aqueous solution with not less than 50 percent but not more than 70 percent ethylamine
UN 2271	3	Ethyl amyl ketone
UN 2272	6.1	N-Ethylaniline
UN 2273	6.1	2-Ethylaniline
UN 2274	6.1	N-Ethyl-N-benzylaniline
UN 2275	3	2-Ethylbutanol
UN 2276	3	2-Ethylhexylamine
UN 2277	3	Ethyl methacrylate
UN 2278	3	n-Heptane
UN 2279	6.1	Hexachlorobutadiene
UN 2280	8	Hexamethylenediamine, solid
UN 2281	6.1	Hexamethylene diisocyanate
UN 2282	3	Hexanols
UN 2283	3	Isobutyl methacrylate, inhibited
UN 2284	3	Isobutyronitrile
UN 2285	6.1	Isocyanatobenzotrifluorides
UN 2286	3	Pentamethylheptane
UN 2287	3	Isoheptenes
UN 2288	3	Isohexenes
UN 2289	8	Isophoronediamine
UN 2290	6.1	Isophorone diisocyanate
UN 2291	6.1	Lead compounds, soluble, n.o.s.
UN 2292	?	(UN No. no longer in use)
UN 2293	3	4-Methoxy-4-methylpentan-2-one
UN 2294	6.1	N-Methylaniline
UN 2295	6.1	Methyl chloroacetate
UN 2296	3	Methylcyclohexane
UN 2297	3	Methylcyclohexanone
UN 2298	3	Methylcyclopentane
UN 2299	6.1	Methyl dichloroacetate
UN 2300	6.1	2-Methyl-5-ethylpyridine

== See also ==
- Lists of UN numbers
