= BOP reagent =

Names
- IUPAC name ((1H-Benzo[d][1,2,3]triazol-1-yl)oxy)tris(dimethylamino)phosphonium hexafluorophosphate(V)
- Other names Castro's reagent

Identifiers
CAS Number	56602-33-6
3D model (JSmol)	Interactive image
ChemSpider	133386
ECHA InfoCard	100.054.782
PubChem CID	151348
UNII	LBD3UE345W
CompTox Dashboard (EPA)	DTXSID60205170
- InChI: InChI=1S/C12H22N6OP.F6P/c1-15(2)20(16(3)4,17(5)6)19-18-12-10-8-7-9-11(12)13-14-18;1-7(2,3,4,5)6/h7-10H,1-6H3;/q+1;-1 Key: MGEVGECQZUIPSV-UHFFFAOYSA-N
- SMILES: F[P-](F)(F)(F)(F)F.n1nn(O[P+](N(C)C)(N(C)C)N(C)C)c2ccccc12

Properties
Chemical formula	C_{12}H_{22}F_{6}N_{6}OP_{2}
Molar mass	442.287 g/mol
Appearance	White crystalline powder
Melting point	136 to 140 °C (277 to 284 °F; 409 to 413 K)
Solubility in water	Partially soluble in cold water reacts (decomposes)
- Except where otherwise noted, data are given for materials in their standard state (at 25 °C [77 °F], 100 kPa). verify (what is ?) Infobox references

BOP (benzotriazol-1-yloxytris(dimethylamino)phosphonium hexafluorophosphate) is a reagent commonly used for the synthesis of amides from carboxylic acids and amines in peptide synthesis. It can be prepared from 1-hydroxybenzotriazole and a chlorophosphonium reagent under basic conditions. This reagent has advantages in peptide synthesis since it avoids side reactions like the dehydration of asparagine or glutamine residues. BOP has used for the synthesis of esters from the carboxylic acids and alcohols. BOP has also been used in the reduction of carboxylic acids to primary alcohols with sodium borohydride (NaBH_{4}). Its use raises safety concerns since the carcinogenic compound HMPA is produced as a stoichiometric by-product.

== See also ==
- PyBOP, a related phosphonium reagent for amide bond formation
- PyAOP, a related phosphonium reagent for amide bond formation
