= List of UN numbers 3101 to 3200 =

UN numbers from UN3101 to UN3200 as assigned by the United Nations Committee of Experts on the Transport of Dangerous Goods are as follows:

== UN 3101 to UN 3200 ==
UN Number	Class	Proper Shipping Name
UN 3101	5.2	Organic peroxide type B, liquid
UN 3102	5.2	Organic peroxide type B, solid
UN 3103	5.2	Organic peroxide type C, liquid
UN 3104	5.2	Organic peroxide type C, solid
UN 3105	5.2	Organic peroxide type D, liquid
UN 3106	5.2	Organic peroxide type D, solid
UN 3107	5.2	Organic peroxide type E, liquid
UN 3108	5.2	Organic peroxide type E, solid
UN 3109	5.2	Organic peroxide type F, liquid
UN 3110	5.2	Organic peroxide type F, solid
UN 3111	5.2	Organic peroxide type B, liquid, temperature controlled
UN 3112	5.2	Organic peroxide type B, solid, temperature controlled
UN 3113	5.2	Organic peroxide type C, liquid, temperature controlled
UN 3114	5.2	Organic peroxide type C, solid, temperature controlled
UN 3115	5.2	Organic peroxide type D, liquid, temperature controlled
UN 3116	5.2	Organic peroxide type D, solid, temperature controlled
UN 3117	5.2	Organic peroxide type E, liquid, temperature controlled
UN 3118	5.2	Organic peroxide type E, solid, temperature controlled
UN 3119	5.2	Organic peroxide type F, liquid, temperature controlled
UN 3120	5.2	Organic peroxide type F, solid, temperature controlled
UN 3121	5.1	Oxidizing solid, water-reactive, n.o.s.
UN 3122	6.1	Toxic liquids, oxidizing, n.o.s. or Toxic liquids, oxidizing, n.o.s. Inhalation Hazard, Packing Group I, Zone A or B
UN 3123	6.1	Toxic liquids, water-reactive, n.o.s. or Toxic liquids, water-reactive, n.o.s. Inhalation Hazard, Packing Group I, Zone A or B
UN 3124	6.1	Toxic solids, self-heating, n.o.s.
UN 3125	6.1	Toxic solids, water-reactive, n.o.s.
UN 3126	4.2	Self-heating solid, corrosive, organic, n.o.s.
UN 3127	4.2	Self-heating solid, oxidizing, n.o.s.
UN 3128	4.2	Self-heating solid, toxic, organic, n.o.s.
UN 3129	4.3	Water-reactive liquid, corrosive, n.o.s.
UN 3130	4.3	Water-reactive liquid, toxic, n.o.s.
UN 3131	4.3	Water-reactive solid, corrosive, n.o.s.
UN 3132	4.3	Water-reactive solid, flammable, n.o.s.
UN 3133	4.3	Water-reactive solid, oxidizing, n.o.s.
UN 3134	4.3	Water-reactive solid, toxic, n.o.s.
UN 3135	4.3	Water-reactive solid, self-heating, n.o.s.
UN 3136	2.2	Trifluoromethane, refrigerated liquid
UN 3137	5.1	Oxidizing solid, flammable, n.o.s.
UN 3138	2.1	Ethylene, acetylene and propylene mixture, refrigerated liquid, with not less than 71,5% ethylene, not more than 22,5% acetylene and not more than 6% propylene
UN 3139	5.1	Oxidizing liquid, n.o.s.
UN 3140	6.1	Alkaloids, liquid, n.o.s. or Alkaloid salts, liquid, n.o.s.
UN 3141	6.1	Antimony compound, inorganic, liquid, n.o.s.
UN 3142	6.1	Disinfectant, liquid, toxic, n.o.s.
UN 3143	6.1	Dye, solid, toxic, n.o.s. or Dye intermediate, solid, toxic, n.o.s.
UN 3144	6.1	Nicotine compound, liquid, n.o.s. or Nicotine preparation, liquid, n.o.s.
UN 3145	8	Alkylphenols, liquid, n.o.s. (including C2-C12 homologues)
UN 3146	6.1	Organotin compounds, solid, n.o.s.
UN 3147	8	Dye, solid, corrosive, n.o.s. or Dye intermediate, solid, corrosive, n.o.s.
UN 3148	4.3	Water-reactive liquid, n.o.s.
UN 3149	5.1	Hydrogen peroxide and peroxyacetic acid mixtures, stabilized, with acids, water, and not more than 5 percent peroxyacetic acid
UN 3150	2.1	Devices, small, hydrocarbon gas powered or Hydrocarbon gas refills for small devices, with release device
UN 3151	9	Polyhalogenated biphenyls, liquid or Polyhalogenated terphenyls, liquid
UN 3152	9	Polyhalogenated biphenyls, solid or Polyhalogenated terphenyls, solid
UN 3153	2.1	Perfluoro(methyl vinyl ether)
UN 3154	2.1	Perfluoro(ethyl vinyl ether)
UN 3155	6.1	Pentachlorophenol
UN 3156	2.2	Compressed gas, oxidizing, n.o.s.
UN 3157	2.2	Liquefied gas, oxidizing, n.o.s.
UN 3158	2.2	Gas, refrigerated liquid, n.o.s. (cryogenic liquid)
UN 3159	2.2	1,1,1,2-Tetrafluoroethane or Refrigerant gas R 134a
UN 3160	2.3	Liquefied gas, toxic, flammable, n.o.s. Inhalation Hazard Zone A, B, C, or D
UN 3161	2.1	Liquefied gas, flammable, n.o.s.
UN 3162	2.3	Liquefied gas, toxic, n.o.s. Inhalation Hazard Zone A, B, C, or D
UN 3163	2.2	Liquefied gas, n.o.s.
UN 3164	2.2	Articles, pressurized pneumatic or Hydraulic (containing non-flammable gas)
UN 3165	3	Aircraft hydraulic power unit fuel tank (containing a mixture of anhydrous hydrazine and monomethyl hydrazine) (M86 fuel)
UN 3166	9	Engines, internal combustion, flammable gas powered or Engines, internal combustion, flammable liquid powered or Vehicle, flammable gas powered or Vehicle, flammable liquid powered
UN 3167	2.1	Gas sample, non-pressurized, flammable, n.o.s., not refrigerated liquid
UN 3168	2.3	Gas sample, non-pressurized, toxic, flammable, n.o.s., not refrigerated liquid
UN 3169	2.3	Gas sample, non-pressurized, toxic, n.o.s., not refrigerated liquid
UN 3170	4.3	Aluminum smelting by-products or Aluminum remelting by-products or Aluminum Dross
UN 3171	9	Battery-powered vehicle or Battery-powered equipment
UN 3172	6.1	Toxins, extracted from living sources, liquid, n.o.s
UN 3173	?	(UN No. no longer in use)
UN 3174	4.2	Titanium disulfide
UN 3175	4.1	Solids containing flammable liquid, n.o.s.
UN 3176	4.1	Flammable solid, organic, molten, n.o.s.
UN 3177	?	(UN No. no longer in use)
UN 3178	4.1	Flammable solid, inorganic, n.o.s.
UN 3179	4.1	Flammable solid, toxic, inorganic, n.o.s.
UN 3180	4.1	Flammable solid, corrosive, inorganic, n.o.s.
UN 3181	4.1	Metal salts of organic compounds, flammable, n.o.s.
UN 3182	4.1	Metal hydrides, flammable, n.o.s.
UN 3183	4.2	Self-heating liquid, organic, n.o.s.
UN 3184	4.2	Self-heating liquid, toxic, organic, n.o.s.
UN 3185	4.2	Self-heating liquid, corrosive, organic, n.o.s.
UN 3186	4.2	Self-heating liquid, inorganic, n.o.s.
UN 3187	4.2	Self-heating liquid, toxic, inorganic, n.o.s.
UN 3188	4.2	Self-heating liquid, corrosive, inorganic, n.o.s.
UN 3189	4.2	Metal powder, self-heating, n.o.s.
UN 3190	4.2	Self-heating solid, inorganic, n.o.s.
UN 3191	4.2	Self-heating solid, toxic, inorganic, n.o.s.
UN 3192	4.2	Self-heating solid, corrosive, inorganic, n.o.s.
UN 3193	?	(UN No. no longer in use)
UN 3194	4.2	Pyrophoric liquid, inorganic, n.o.s.
UN 3195 to UN 3199	?	(UN Nos. no longer in use)
UN 3200	4.2	Pyrophoric solid, inorganic, n.o.s.

== See also ==
- Lists of UN numbers
