= List of UN numbers 0101 to 0200 =

UN numbers from UN0101 to UN0200 as assigned by the United Nations Committee of Experts on the Transport of Dangerous Goods are as follows:

== UN 0101 to UN 0200 ==
UN Number	Class	Proper Shipping Name
UN 0101	1.3G	Fuse, non-detonating instantaneous or quickmatch
UN 0102	1.2D	Cord detonating or Fuse detonating metal clad
UN 0103	1.4G	Fuse, igniter tubular metal clad
UN 0104	1.4D	Cord, detonating, mild effect or Fuse, detonating, mild effect metal clad
UN 0105	1.4S	Fuse, safety
UN 0106	1.1B	Fuzes, detonating
UN 0107	1.2B	Fuzes, detonating
UN 0108 to UN 0109	?	(UN No.s no longer in use)
UN 0110	1.4S	Grenades, practice, hand or rifle
UN 0111 to UN 0112	?	(UN No.s no longer in use)
UN 0113	1.1A	Guanyl nitrosaminoguanylidene hydrazine, wetted with not less than 30 percent water, by mass
UN 0114	1.1A	Guanyl nitrosaminoguanyltetrazene, wetted or Tetrazene, wetted with not less than 30 percent water or mixture of alcohol and water, by mass
UN 0115 to UN 0117	?	(UN No.s no longer in use)
UN 0118	1.1D	Hexolite, or Hexotol dry or wetted with less than 15 percent water, by mass
UN 0119 to UN 0120	?	(UN No.s no longer in use)
UN 0121	1.1G	Igniters
UN 0122 to 0123	?	(UN No.s no longer in use)
UN 0124	1.1D	Jet, perforating guns, charged oil well, without detonator
UN 0125 to UN 0128	?	(UN No.s no longer in use)
UN 0129	1.1A	Lead azide, wetted with not less than 20 percent water or mixture of alcohol and water, by mass
UN 0130	1.1A	Lead styphnate, wetted or Lead trinitroresorcinate, wetted with not less than 20 percent water or mixture of alcohol and water, by mass
UN 0131	1.4S	Lighters, fuse
UN 0132	1.3C	Deflagrating metal salts of aromatic nitroderivatives, n.o.s.
UN 0133	1.1D	Mannitol hexanitrate, wetted or Nitromannite, wetted with not less than 40 percent water, or mixture of alcohol and water, by mass
UN 0134	?	(UN No. no longer in use)
UN 0135	1.1A	Mercury fulminate, wetted with not less than 20 percent water, or mixture of alcohol and water, by mass
UN 0136	1.1F	Mines with bursting charge
UN 0137	1.1D	Mines with bursting charge
UN 0138	1.2D	Mines with bursting charge
UN 0139 to UN 0142	?	(UN No.s no longer in use)
UN 0143	1.1D	Nitroglycerin, desensitized with not less than 40 percent non-volatile water-insoluble phlegmatizer, by mass
UN 0144	1.1D	Nitroglycerin, solution in alcohol, with more than 1 percent but not more than 10 percent nitroglycerin
UN 0145	?	(UN No. no longer in use)
UN 0146	1.1D	Nitrostarch, dry or wetted with less than 20 percent water, by mass
UN 0147	1.1D	Nitro urea
UN 0148 to UN 0149	?	(UN No.s no longer in use)
UN 0150	1.1D	Pentaerythrite tetranitrate, wetted or Pentaerythritol tetranitrate, wetted or PETN, wetted with not less than 25 percent water, by mass, or Pentaerythrite tetranitrate, or Pentaerythritol tetranitrate, or PETN, desensitized with not less than 15 percent phlegmatizer, by mass
UN 0151	1.1D	Pentolite, dry or wetted with less than 15 percent water, by mass
UN 0152	?	(UN No. no longer in use)
UN 0153	1.1D	Trinitroaniline or Picramide
UN 0154	1.1D	Trinitrophenol or picric acid, dry or wetted with less than 30 percent water, by mass
UN 0155	1.1D	Trinitrochlorobenzene or Picryl chloride
UN 0156 to UN 0157	?	(UN No.s no longer in use)
UN 0158	?	(UN No. no longer in use) Potassium salts of nitroaromatic derivatives (UN No. no longer in use)
UN 0159	1.3C	Powder cake, wetted or Powder paste, wetted with not less than 25 percent water, by mass
UN 0160	1.1C	Powder, smokeless
UN 0161	1.3C	Powder, smokeless
UN 0162 to UN 0166	?	(UN No.s no longer in use)
UN 0167	1.1F	Projectiles, with bursting charge
UN 0168	1.1D	Projectiles, with bursting charge
UN 0169	1.2D	Projectiles, with bursting charge
UN 0170	?	(UN No. no longer in use)
UN 0171	1.2G	Ammunition, illuminating with or without burster, expelling charge, or propelling charge
UN 0172	?	(UN No. no longer in use)
UN 0173	1.4S	Release devices, explosive
UN 0174	1.4S	Rivets, explosive
UN 0175 to UN 0179	?	(UN No.s no longer in use)
UN 0180	1.1F	Rockets, with bursting charge
UN 0181	1.1E	Rockets, with bursting charge
UN 0182	1.2E	Rockets, with bursting charge
UN 0183	1.3C	Rockets, with inert head
UN 0184 to UN 0185	?	(UN No.s no longer in use)
UN 0186	1.3C	Rocket motors
UN 0187 to UN 0189	?	(UN No.s no longer in use)
UN 0190	1	Samples, explosive, other than initiating explosives
UN 0191	1.4G	Signal devices, hand
UN 0192	1.1G	Signals, railway track, explosive
UN 0193	1.4S	Signals, railway track, explosive
UN 0194	1.1G	Signals, distress, ship
UN 0195	1.3G	Signals, distress, ship
UN 0196	1.1G	Signals, smoke
UN 0197	1.4G	Signals, smoke
UN 0198 to UN 0200	?	(UN No.s no longer in use)

== See also ==
- Lists of UN numbers
