= List of UN numbers 2801 to 2900 =

UN numbers from UN2801 to UN2900 as assigned by the United Nations Committee of Experts on the Transport of Dangerous Goods are as follows:

== UN 2801 to UN 2900 ==
UN Number	Class	Proper Shipping Name
UN 2801	8	Dyes, liquid, corrosive, n.o.s. or Dye intermediates, liquid, corrosive, n.o.s.
UN 2802	8	Copper(II) chloride
UN 2803	8	Gallium
UN 2804	?	(UN No. longer in use)
UN 2805	4.3	Lithium hydride, fused solid
UN 2806	4.3	Lithium nitride
UN 2807	9	Magnetized material
UN 2808	8	(UN No. no longer in use) Waste Mercury contained in manufactured articles (UN No. no longer in use)
UN 2809	8	Mercury or Mercury contained in manufactured articles
UN 2810	6.1	Toxic liquids, organic, n.o.s. or Toxic, liquids, organic, n.o.s. Inhalation Hazard, Packing Group I, Zone A or B
UN 2811	6.1	Toxic solid, organic, n.o.s.
UN 2812	8	Sodium aluminate, solid
UN 2813	4.3	Water-reactive solid, n.o.s.
UN 2814	6.2	Infectious substance, affecting humans or Infectious Substance, affecting humans (Risk Group 2).
UN 2815	8	N-Aminoethylpiperazine
UN 2816	?	(UN No. no longer in use)
UN 2817	8	Ammonium hydrogendifluoride, solution
UN 2818	8	Ammonium polysulfide, solution
UN 2819	8	Amyl acid phosphate
UN 2820	8	Butyric acid
UN 2821	6.1	Phenol solutions
UN 2822	6.1	2-Chloropyridine
UN 2823	8	Crotonic acid liquid or Crotonic acid solid
UN 2824	?	(UN No. no longer in use)
UN 2825	?	(UN No. no longer in use) N,N-Diisopropyl ethanolamine (UN No. no longer in use)
UN 2826	8	Ethyl chlorothioformate
UN 2827 to 2828	?	(UN No.s no longer in use)
UN 2829	8	Caproic acid
UN 2830	4.3	Lithium ferrosilicon
UN 2831	6.1	1,1,1-Trichloroethane
UN 2832 to 2833	?	(UN No.s no longer in use)
UN 2834	8	Phosphorous acid
UN 2835	4.3	Sodium aluminum hydride
UN 2836	?	(UN No. no longer in use)
UN 2837	8	Bisulfate, aqueous solution
UN 2838	3	Vinyl butyrate, inhibited
UN 2839	6.1	Aldol
UN 2840	3	Butyraldoxime
UN 2841	3	Di-n-amylamine
UN 2842	3	Nitroethane
UN 2843	?	(UN No. no longer in use)
UN 2844	4.3	Calcium manganese silicon
UN 2845	4.2	Pyrophoric liquids, organic, n.o.s.
UN 2846	4.2	Pyrophoric solids, organic, n.o.s.
UN 2847 to 2848	?	(UN No.s no longer in use)
UN 2849	6.1	3-Chloropropan-1-ol
UN 2850	3	Propylene tetramer
UN 2851	8	Boron trifluoride dihydrate
UN 2852	4.1	Dipicryl sulfide, wetted with not less than 10 percent water, by mass
UN 2853	6.1	Magnesium fluorosilicate
UN 2854	6.1	Ammonium fluorosilicate
UN 2855	6.1	Zinc fluorosilicate
UN 2856	6.1	Fluorosilicates, n.o.s.
UN 2857	2	Refrigerating machines, containing nonflammable, nontoxic, liquefied gas or ammonia solution (UN2672)
UN 2858	4.1	Zirconium, dry, coiled wire, finished metal sheets, strip (thinner than 254 micrometres but not thinner than 18 micrometres)
UN 2859	6.1	Ammonium metavanadate
UN 2860	6.1	(UN No. no longer in use) Vanadium trioxide (UN No. no longer in use)
UN 2861	6.1	Ammonium polyvanadate
UN 2862	6.1	Vanadium pentoxide, nonfused form
UN 2863	6.1	Sodium ammonium vanadate
UN 2864	6.1	Potassium metavanadate
UN 2865	8	Hydroxylamine sulfate
UN 2866	?	(UN No. no longer in use)
UN 2867	?	(UN No. no longer in use) Ink (UN No. no longer in use)
UN 2868	?	(UN No. no longer in use) Resin solution (UN No. no longer in use)
UN 2869	8	Titanium trichloride mixtures
UN 2870	4.2	Aluminum borohydride or Aluminum borohydride in devices
UN 2871	6.1	Antimony powder
UN 2872	6.1	Dibromochloropropane
UN 2873	6.1	Dibutylaminoethanol
UN 2874	6.1	Furfuryl alcohol
UN 2875	6.1	Hexachlorophene
UN 2876	6.1	Resorcinol
UN 2877	?	(UN No. no longer in use) Thiourea (UN No. no longer in use)
UN 2878	4.1	Titanium sponge granules or Titanium sponge powders
UN 2879	8	Selenium oxychloride
UN 2880	5.1	Calcium hypochlorite, hydrated or Calcium hypochlorite, hydrated mixtures, with not less than 5.5 percent but not more than 10 percent water
UN 2881	4.2	Metal catalyst, dry
UN 2882	?	(UN No. no longer in use)
UN 2883	?	(UN No. no longer in use) 2,2-Di-(tert-butylperoxy)propane (UN No. no longer in use)
UN 2884	?	(UN No. no longer in use) 2,2-Di-(tert-butylperoxy)propane (UN No. no longer in use)
UN 2885	?	(UN No. no longer in use) 1,1-Di-(tertbutylperoxy) cyclohexane (UN No. no longer in use)
UN 2886	?	(UN No. no longer in use) tert-Butyl peroxy-2-ethylhexanoate, with 2,2-Di-(tert-butylperoxy)butane (UN No. no longer in use)
UN 2887	?	(UN No. no longer in use) tert-Butyl peroxy-2-ethylhexanoate]] (UN No. no longer in use)
UN 2888	?	(UN No. no longer in use) tert-Butyl peroxy-2-ethylhexanoate (UN No. no longer in use)
UN 2889	?	(UN No. no longer in use) Diisotridecyl peroxydicarbonate (UN No. no longer in use)
UN 2900	6.2	Infectious substance, affecting animals

== See also ==
- Lists of UN numbers
