= List of UN numbers 3401 to 3500 =

UN numbers from UN3401 to UN3500 as assigned by the United Nations Committee of Experts on the Transport of Dangerous Goods are as follows:

== UN 3401 to UN 3500 ==
UN Number	Class	Proper Shipping Name
UN 3401	4.3	Alkali metal amalgam, solid
UN 3402	4.3	Alkaline earth metal amalgam, solid
UN 3403	4.3	Potassium metal alloys, solid
UN 3404	4.3	Potassium sodium alloys, solid
UN 3405	5.1	Barium chlorate solution
UN 3406	5.1	Barium perchlorate solution
UN 3407	5.1	Chlorate and magnesium chloride mixture solution
UN 3408	5.1	Lead perchlorate solution
UN 3409	6.1	Chloronitrobenzenes, liquid
UN 3410	6.1	4-Chloro-o-toluidine hydrochloride solution
UN 3411	6.1	beta-Naphthylamine solution
UN 3412	8	Formic acid a. with not less than 10% but not more than 85% acid by mass, or, b. with not less than 5% but not more than 10% acid by mass
UN 3413	6.1	Potassium cyanide solution
UN 3414	6.1	Sodium cyanide solution
UN 3415	6.1	Sodium fluoride solution
UN 3416	6.1	Chloroacetophenone, liquid
UN 3417	6.1	Xylyl bromide solution
UN 3418	6.1	2,4-Toluylenediamine solution
UN 3419	8	Boron trifluoride-acetic acid complex, solid
UN 3420	8	Boron trifluoride-propionic acid complex, solid
UN 3421	8	Potassium hydrogen difluoride solution
UN 3422	6.1	Potassium fluoride solution
UN 3423	8	Tetramethylammonium hydroxide, solid
UN 3424	6.1	Ammonium dinitro-o-cresolate solution
UN 3425	8	Bromoacetic acid, solid
UN 3426	6.1	Acrylamide solution
UN 3427	6.1	Chlorobenzyl chlorides, solid
UN 3428	6.1	3-Chloro-4-methylphenyl isocyanate, solid
UN 3429	6.1	Chlorotoluidines, liquid
UN 3430	6.1	Xylenols, liquid
UN 3431	6.1	Nitrobenzotrifluorides, solid
UN 3432	9	Polychlorinated biphenyls, solid
UN 3433	(4.2)	(UN No. no longer in use) Lithium alkyls, solid (UN No. no longer in use)
UN 3434	6.1	Nitrocresols, liquid
UN 3435	(6.1)	(UN No. no longer in use) Hydroquinone solution (UN No. no longer in use)
UN 3436	6.1	Hexafluoroacetone hydrate, solid
UN 3437	6.1	Chlorocresols, solid
UN 3438	6.1	alpha-Methylbenzyl alcohol, solid
UN 3439	6.1	Nitriles, solid, toxic, n.o.s.
UN 3440	6.1	Selenium compound, liquid, n.o.s.
UN 3441	6.1	Chlorodinitrobenzenes, solid
UN 3442	6.1	Dichloroanilines, solid
UN 3443	6.1	Dinitrobenzenes, solid
UN 3444	6.1	Nicotine hydrochloride, solid
UN 3445	6.1	Nicotine sulphate, solid
UN 3446	6.1	Nitrotoluenes, solid
UN 3447	6.1	Nitroxylenes, solid
UN 3448	6.1	Tear gas substance, solid, n.o.s.
UN 3449	6.1	Bromobenzyl cyanides, solid
UN 3450	6.1	Diphenylchloroarsine, solid
UN 3451	6.1	Toluidines, solid
UN 3452	6.1	Xylidines, solid
UN 3453	8	Phosphoric acid, solid
UN 3454	6.1	Dinitrotoluenes, solid
UN 3455	6.1	Cresols, solid
UN 3456	8	Nitrosylsulphuric acid, solid
UN 3457	6.1	Chloronitrotoluenes, solid
UN 3458	6.1	Nitroanisoles, solid
UN 3459	6.1	Nitrobromobenzenes, solid
UN 3460	6.1	N-Ethylbenzyltoluidines, solid
UN 3461	(4.2)	(UN No. no longer in use) Aluminium alkyl halides, solid (UN No. no longer in use)
UN 3462	6.1	Toxins extracted from living sources, solid, n.o.s.
UN 3463	8	Propionic acid with not less than 90% acid by mass
UN 3464	6.1	Organophosphorus compound, toxic, solid, n.o.s.
UN 3465	6.1	Organoarsenic compound, solid, n.o.s.
UN 3466	6.1	Metal carbonyls, solid, n.o.s.
UN 3467	6.1	Organometallic compound, toxic, solid, n.o.s.
UN 3468	2.1	Hydrogen in metal hydride storage system
UN 3469	3	Paint, flammable, corrosive or Paint related material, flammable, corrosive
UN 3470	8	Paint, corrosive, flammable or Paint related material, corrosive, flammable
UN 3471	8	Hydrogen difluorides solution, n.o.s.
UN 3472	8	Crotonic acid, liquid
UN 3473	3	Fuel cell cartridges, or Fuel cell cartridges contained in equipment or Fuel cell cartridges packed with equipment, containing flammable liquids
UN 3474	4.1	1-Hydroxybenzotriazole, anhydrous, wetted with not less than 20% water, by mass
UN 3475	3	Ethanol and gasoline mixture or ethanol and motor spirit mixture or ethanol and petrol mixture, with more than 10% ethanol
UN 3476	4.3	Fuel cell cartridges or Fuel cell cartridges contained in equipment or Fuel cell cartridges packed with equipment, containing water-reactive substances
UN 3477	8	Fuel cell cartridges or Fuel cell cartridges contained in equipment or Fuel cell cartridges packed with equipment, containing corrosive substances
UN 3478	2.1	Fuel cell cartridges or Fuel cell cartridges contained in equipment or Fuel cell cartridges packed with equipment, containing liquefied flammable gas
UN 3479	2.1	Fuel cell cartridges or Fuel cell cartridges contained in equipment or Fuel cell cartridges packed with equipment, containing hydrogen in metal hydride
UN 3480	9	Lithium-ion batteries (including lithium-ion polymer batteries)
UN 3481	9	Lithium-ion batteries contained in equipment or lithium-ion batteries packed with equipment (including lithium-ion polymer batteries)
UN 3482	4.3	Alkali metal dispersion, flammable or alkaline earth metal dispersion, flammable
UN 3483	6.1	Motor fuel anti-knock mixture, flammable
UN 3484	8	Hydrazine aqueous solution, flammable with more than 37% hydrazine, by mass
UN 3485	5.1	Calcium hypochlorite, dry, corrosive or Calcium hypochlorite mixture, dry, corrosive with more than 39% available chlorine (8.8% available oxygen)
UN 3486	5.1	Calcium hypochlorite mixture, dry, corrosive with more than 10% but not more than 39% available chlorine
UN 3487	5.1	Calcium hypochlorite, hydrated, corrosive or Calcium hypochlorite mixture, hydrated, corrosive with not less than 5.5% but not more than 16% water
UN 3488	6.1	Toxic by inhalation liquid, flammable, corrosive, N.O.S. with an inhalation toxicity lower than or equal to 200 ml/m3 and saturated vapour concentration greater than or equal to 500 LC50
UN 3489	6.1	Toxic by inhalation liquid, flammable, corrosive, N.O.S. with an inhalation toxicity lower than or equal to 1000 ml/m3 and saturated vapour concentration greater than or equal to 10 LC50
UN 3490	6.1	Toxic by inhalation liquid, water reactive, flammable, N.O.S. with an inhalation toxicity lower than or equal to 200 ml/m3 and saturated vapour concentration greater than or equal to 500 LC50
UN 3491	6.1	Toxic by inhalation liquid, water reactive, flammable, N.O.S. with an inhalation toxicity lower than or equal to 1000 ml/m3 and saturated vapour concentration greater than or equal to 10 LC50
UN 3492	6.1	(UN No. no longer in use) Toxic by inhalation liquid, corrosive, flammable, N.O.S. with an inhalation toxicity lower than or equal to 200 ml/m3 and saturated vapour concentration greater than or equal to 500 LC50 (UN No. no longer in use)
UN 3493	6.1	(UN No. no longer in use) Toxic by inhalation liquid, corrosive, flammable, N.O.S. with an inhalation toxicity lower than or equal to 1000 ml/m3 and saturated vapour concentration greater than or equal to 10 LC50 (UN No. no longer in use)
UN 3494	3	Petroleum sour crude oil, flammable, toxic
UN 3495	8	Iodine
UN 3496	9	Batteries, nickel-metal hydride
UN 3497	4.2	Krill meal
UN 3498	8	Iodine Monochloride, liquid
UN 3499	9	Capacitor, electric double layer (with an energy storage capacity greater than 0.3 Wh)
UN 3500	2.2	Chemical under Pressure, N.O.S.

== See also ==
- Lists of UN numbers
