= List of UN numbers 1301 to 1400 =

UN numbers from UN1301 to UN1400 as assigned by the United Nations Committee of Experts on the Transport of Dangerous Goods are as follows:

== UN 1301 to UN 1400 ==
UN Number	Class	Proper Shipping Name
UN 1301	3	Vinyl acetate, inhibited
UN 1302	3	Vinyl ethyl ether, inhibited
UN 1303	3	Vinylidene chloride, inhibited
UN 1304	3	Vinyl isobutyl ether, inhibited
UN 1305	3	Vinyltrichlorosilane, inhibited
UN 1306	3	Wood preservatives, liquid
UN 1307	3	Xylenes
UN 1308	3	Zirconium suspended in a liquid
UN 1309	4.1	Aluminium powder, coated
UN 1310	4.1	Ammonium picrate, wetted with not less than 10 percent water, by mass
UN 1311	?	(UN No. no longer in use)
UN 1312	4.1	Borneol
UN 1313	4.1	Calcium resinate
UN 1314	4.1	Calcium resinate, fused
UN 1315 to 1317	?	(UN No.s no longer in use)
UN 1318	4.1	Cobalt resinate, precipitated
UN 1319	?	(UN No. no longer in use)
UN 1320	4.1	Dinitrophenol, wetted with not less than 15 percent water, by mass
UN 1321	4.1	Dinitrophenolates, wetted with not less than 15 percent water, by mass
UN 1322	4.1	Dinitroresorcinol, wetted with not less than 15 percent water, by mass
UN 1323	4.1	Ferrocerium
UN 1324	4.1	Films, nitrocellulose base, gelatine coated (except scrap)
UN 1325	4.1	Flammable solids, organic, n.o.s.
UN 1326	4.1	Hafnium powder, wetted with not less than 25% water (a visible excess of water must be present) (a) mechanically produced, particle size less than 53 micrometres; (b) chemically produced, particle size less than 840 micrometres
UN 1327	4.1	Hay, Straw or Bhusa, wet, damp or contaminated with oil
UN 1328	4.1	Hexamethylenetetramine
UN 1329	?	(UN No. no longer in use)
UN 1330	4.1	Manganese resinate
UN 1331	4.1	Matches, strike anywhere
UN 1332	4.1	Metaldehyde
UN 1333	4.1	Cerium, slabs, ingots, or rods
UN 1334	4.1	Naphthalene, crude or Naphthalene, refined
UN 1335	?	(UN No. no longer in use)
UN 1336	4.1	Nitroguanidine, wetted or Picrite, wetted with not less than 20 percent water, by mass
UN 1337	4.1	Nitrostarch, wetted with not less than 20 percent water, by mass
UN 1338	4.1	Phosphorus, amorphous
UN 1339	4.1	Phosphorus heptasulfide, free from yellow or white phosphorus
UN 1340	4.3	Phosphorus pentasulfide, free from yellow or white phosphorus
UN 1341	4.1	Phosphorus sesquisulfide, free from yellow or white phosphorus
UN 1342	?	(UN No. no longer in use)
UN 1343	4.1	Phosphorus trisulfide, free from yellow or white phosphorus
UN 1344	4.1	Trinitrophenol, wetted with not less than 30 percent water, by mass
UN 1345	4.1	Rubber scrap or shoddy
UN 1346	4.1	Silicon powder, amorphous
UN 1347	4.1	Silver picrate, wetted with not less than 30 percent water, by mass
UN 1348	4.1	Sodium dinitro-o-cresolate, wetted with not less than 15 percent water, by mass
UN 1349	4.1	Sodium picramate, wetted with not less than 20 percent water, by mass
UN 1350	4.1	Sulfur
UN 1351	?	(UN No. no longer in use)
UN 1352	4.1	Titanium powder, wetted with not less than 25 percent water (a visible excess of water must be present) (a) mechanically produced, particle size less than 53 micrometres; (b) chemically produced, particle size less than 840 micrometres
UN 1353	4.1	Fibers or Fabrics impregnated with weakly nitrated nitrocellulose, n.o.s.
UN 1354	4.1	Trinitrobenzene, wetted with not less than 30 percent water, by mass
UN 1355	4.1	Trinitrobenzoic acid, wetted with not less than 30 percent water, by mass
UN 1356	4.1	Trinitrotoluene wetted with not less than 30 percent water, by mass
UN 1357	4.1	Urea nitrate, wetted with not less than 20 percent water, by mass
UN 1358	4.1	Zirconium powder, wetted with not less than 25 percent water (a visible excess of water must be present) (a) mechanically produced, particle size less than 53 micrometres; (b) chemically produced, particle size less than 840 micrometres
UN 1359	?	(UN No. no longer in use) Bags, empty and unwashed (UN No. no longer in use)
UN 1360	4.3	Calcium phosphide
UN 1361	4.2	Carbon, animal or vegetable origin
UN 1362	4.2	Carbon, activated
UN 1363	4.2	Copra
UN 1364	4.2	Cotton waste, oily
UN 1365	4.2	Cotton, wet
UN 1366	4.2	(UN No. no longer in use) Diethylzinc (UN No. no longer in use)
UN 1367	?	(UN No. no longer in use) Diethylmagnesium (UN No. no longer in use)
UN 1368	?	(UN No. no longer in use) Dimethylmagnesium (UN No. no longer in use)
UN 1369	4.2	p-Nitrosodimethylaniline
UN 1370	4.2	(UN No. no longer in use) Dimethylzinc (UN No. no longer in use)
UN 1371	?	(UN No. no longer in use) Driers (UN No. no longer in use)
UN 1372	4.2	Fibers, animal or Fibers, vegetable, burnt, wet or damp
UN 1373	4.2	Fibers or Fabrics, animal or vegetable or Synthetic, n.o.s. with animal or vegetable oil
UN 1374	4.2	Fish meal, unstabilized or Fish scrap, unstabilized
UN 1375	?	(UN No. no longer in use) Fuel, pyrophoric, n.o.s. (UN No. no longer in use)
UN 1376	4.2	Iron oxide, spent, or Iron sponge, spent obtained from coal gas purification
UN 1377	3	Resin (UN No. no longer in use)
UN 1378	4.2	Metal catalyst, wetted with a visible excess of liquid
UN 1379	4.2	Paper, unsaturated oil treated incompletely dried (including carbon paper)
UN 1380	4.2	Pentaborane
UN 1381	4.2	Phosphorus, white dry or Phosphorus, white, under water or Phosphorus white, in solution or Phosphorus, yellow dry or Phosphorus, yellow, under water or Phosphorus, yellow, in solution
UN 1382	4.2	Potassium sulfide, anhydrous or Potassium sulfide with less than 30 percent water of crystallization
UN 1383	4.2	Pyrophoric metals, n.o.s. or Pyrophoric alloys, n.o.s.
UN 1384	4.2	Sodium dithionite or Sodium hydrosulfite
UN 1385	4.2	Sodium sulfide, anhydrous or Sodium sulfide with less than 30 percent water of crystallization
UN 1386	4.2	Seed cake, containing vegetable oil solvent extractions and expelled seeds, with not more than 10 percent of oil and when the amount of moisture is higher than 11 percent, with not more than 20 percent of oil and moisture combined or Seed cake with more than 1.5 percent oil and not more than 11 percent moisture. It is not to be confused with bush bread, which is also referred to as seed cake.
UN 1387	4.2	Wool waste, wet
UN 1388	?	(UN No. no longer in use)
UN 1389	4.3	Alkali metal amalgam, liquid or Alkali metal amalgam, solid
UN 1390	4.3	Alkali metal amides
UN 1391	4.3	Alkali metal dispersions, or Alkaline earth metal dispersions
UN 1392	4.3	Alkaline earth metal amalgams
UN 1393	4.3	Alkaline earth metal alloys, n.o.s.
UN 1394	4.3	Aluminium carbide
UN 1395	4.3	Aluminium ferrosilicon powder
UN 1396	4.3	Aluminium powder, uncoated
UN 1397	4.3	Aluminium phosphide
UN 1398	4.3	Aluminium silicon powder, uncoated
UN 1399	4.3	(UN No. no longer in use) Barium (UN No. no longer in use)
UN 1400	4.3	Barium

n.o.s. = not otherwise specified meaning a collective entry to which substances, mixtures, solutions or articles may be assigned if a) they are not mentioned by name in 3.2 Dangerous Goods List AND b) they exhibit chemical, physical and/or dangerous properties corresponding to the Class, classification code, packing group and the name and description of the n.o.s. entry

== See also ==
- Lists of UN numbers
