= List of UN numbers 2101 to 2200 =

UN numbers from UN2101 to UN2200 as assigned by the United Nations Committee of Experts on the Transport of Dangerous Goods are as follows:

== UN 2101 to UN 2200 ==
UN Number	Class	Proper Shipping Name
UN 2101	?	(UN No. no longer in use) tert-Butyl peroxymaleate (UN No. no longer in use)
UN 2102	?	(UN No. no longer in use) Di-tert-butyl peroxide (UN No. no longer in use)
UN 2103	?	(UN No. no longer in use) tert-Butyl peroxyisopropyl carbonate (UN No. no longer in use)
UN 2104	?	(UN No. no longer in use) tert-Butyl peroxy-3,5,5-trimethylhexanoate or tert-Butyl peroxyisononanoate (UN No. no longer in use)
UN 2105	?	(UN No. no longer in use) tert-Butyl peroxyphthalate (UN No. no longer in use)
UN 2106	?	(UN No. no longer in use) Di-(tert-butylperoxy)phthalate (UN No. no longer in use)
UN 2107	?	(UN No. no longer in use) Di-(tert-butylperoxy)phthalate (UN No. no longer in use)
UN 2108	?	(UN No. no longer in use) Di-(tert-butylperoxy)phthalate (UN No. no longer in use)
UN 2109	?	(UN No. no longer in use)
UN 2110	?	(UN No. no longer in use) tert-Butyl peroxypivalate (UN No. no longer in use)
UN 2111	?	(UN No. no longer in use) 2,2-Di-(tert-butylperoxy)butane (UN No. no longer in use)
UN 2112	?	(UN No. no longer in use) 1,3-Di-(2-tert-butylperoxyisopropyl)benzene, or 1,4-Di-(2-tert-butylperoxyisopropyl)benzene, or 1,3-Di-(2-tert-butylperoxyisopropyl)benzene and 1,4-Di-(tert-butylperoxyisopropyl)benzene mixtures (UN No. no longer in use)
UN 2113	?	(UN No. no longer in use) Di-(4-chlorobenzoyl)peroxide or p-Chlorobenzoyl peroxide (UN No. no longer in use)
UN 2114	?	(UN No. no longer in use) Di-(4-chlorobenzoyl)peroxide or p-Chlorobenzoyl peroxide (UN No. no longer in use)
UN 2115	?	(UN No. no longer in use) Di-(4-chlorobenzoyl)peroxide or p-Chlorobenzoyl peroxide (UN No. no longer in use)
UN 2116	?	(UN No. no longer in use) Cumene hydroperoxide or Cumyl hydroperoxide (UN No. no longer in use)
UN 2117	?	(UN No. no longer in use) Cyclohexanone peroxides (UN No. no longer in use)
UN 2118	?	(UN No. no longer in use) Cyclohexanone peroxides (UN No. no longer in use)
UN 2119	?	(UN No. no longer in use) Cyclohexanone peroxides (UN No. no longer in use)
UN 2120	?	(UN No. no longer in use) Decanoyl peroxide or Didecanoyl peroxide (UN No. no longer in use)
UN 2121	?	(UN No. no longer in use) Dicumyl peroxide, dry (UN No. no longer in use)
UN 2122	?	(UN No. no longer in use) Di-(2-ethylhexyl)peroxydicarbonate (UN No. no longer in use)
UN 2123	?	(UN No. no longer in use) Di-(2-ethylhexyl)peroxydicarbonate (UN No. no longer in use)
UN 2124	?	(UN No. no longer in use) Lauroyl peroxide or Dilauroyl peroxide (UN No. no longer in use)
UN 2125	?	(UN No. no longer in use) p-Menthane hydroperoxide (UN No. no longer in use)
UN 2126	?	(UN No. no longer in use) Methyl isobutyl ketone peroxide (UN No. no longer in use)
UN 2127	?	(UN No. no longer in use) Ethyl methyl ketone peroxides (UN No. no longer in use)
UN 2128	?	(UN No. no longer in use) Di-(3,5,5-trimethylhexanoyl)peroxide or Isononanyl peroxide (UN No. no longer in use)
UN 2129	?	(UN No. no longer in use) Di-n-octanoyl peroxide or n-Octanoyl peroxide (UN No. no longer in use)
UN 2130	?	(UN No. no longer in use) Pelargonyl peroxide (UN No. no longer in use)
UN 2131	?	(UN No. no longer in use) Peroxyacetic acid (UN No. no longer in use)
UN 2132	?	(UN No. no longer in use) Dipropionyl peroxide or Propionyl peroxide (UN No. no longer in use)
UN 2133	?	(UN No. no longer in use) Diisopropyl peroxydicarbonate or Isopropyl peroxydicarbonate (UN No. no longer in use)
UN 2134	?	(UN No. no longer in use) Diisopropyl peroxydicarbonate or Isopropyl peroxydicarbonate (UN No. no longer in use)
UN 2135	?	(UN No. no longer in use) Disuccinic acid peroxide or Succinic acid peroxide (UN No. no longer in use)
UN 2136	?	(UN No. no longer in use) Tetralin hydroperoxide (UN No. no longer in use)
UN 2137	?	(UN No. no longer in use) 2,4-Dichlorobenzoyl peroxide (UN No. no longer in use)
UN 2138	?	(UN No. no longer in use) 2,4-Dichlorobenzoyl peroxide (UN No. no longer in use)
UN 2139	?	(UN No. no longer in use) 2,4-Dichlorobenzoyl peroxide (UN No. no longer in use)
UN 2140	?	(UN No. no longer in use) n-Butyl-4,4-di-(tert-butylperoxy)valerate (UN No. no longer in use)
UN 2141	?	(UN No. no longer in use) n-Butyl-4,4-di-(tert-butylperoxy)valerate (UN No. no longer in use)
UN 2142	?	(UN No. no longer in use) tert-Butyl peroxyisobutyrate (UN No. no longer in use)
UN 2143	?	(UN No. no longer in use) tert-Butyl peroxy-2-ethylhexanoate (UN No. no longer in use)
UN 2144	?	(UN No. no longer in use) tert-Butyl peroxydiethylacetate (UN No. no longer in use)
UN 2145	?	(UN No. no longer in use) 1,1-Di-(tert-butylperoxy)-3,3,5-trimethyl cyclohexane (UN No. no longer in use)
UN 2146	?	(UN No. no longer in use) 1,1-Di-(tert-butylperoxy)-3,3,5-trimethyl cyclohexane (UN No. no longer in use)
UN 2147	?	(UN No. no longer in use) 1,1-Di-(tert-butylperoxy)-3,3,5-trimethyl cyclohexane (UN No. no longer in use)
UN 2148	?	(UN No. no longer in use) Di-(1-hydroxycyclohexyl)peroxide (UN No. no longer in use)
UN 2149	?	(UN No. no longer in use) Dibenzyl peroxydicarbonate (UN No. no longer in use)
UN 2150	?	(UN No. no longer in use) Di-sec-butyl peroxydicarbonate (UN No. no longer in use)
UN 2151	?	(UN No. no longer in use) Di-sec-butyl peroxydicarbonate (UN No. no longer in use)
UN 2152	?	(UN No. no longer in use) Dicyclohexyl peroxydicarbonate (UN No. no longer in use)
UN 2153	?	(UN No. no longer in use) Dicyclohexyl peroxydicarbonate]] (UN No. no longer in use)
UN 2154	?	(UN No. no longer in use) Di-(4-tert-butylcyclohexyl)peroxydicarbonate (UN No. no longer in use)
UN 2155	?	(UN No. no longer in use) 2,5-Dimethyl-2,5-di-(tert-butylperoxy)hexane (UN No. no longer in use)
UN 2156	?	(UN No. no longer in use) 2,5-Dimethyl-2,5-di-(tert-butylperoxy)hexane (UN No. no longer in use)
UN 2157	?	(UN No. no longer in use) 2,5-Dimethyl-2,5-di-(2-ethylhexanoylperoxy)hexane (UN No. no longer in use)
UN 2158	?	(UN No. no longer in use) 2,5-Dimethyl-2,5-di-(tert-butylperoxy)hexyne-3 (UN No. no longer in use)
UN 2159	?	(UN No. no longer in use) 2,5-Dimethyl-2,5-di-(tert-butylperoxy)hexyne-3 (UN No. no longer in use)
UN 2160	?	(UN No. no longer in use) 1,1,3,3-Tetramethyl butyl hydroperoxide (UN No. no longer in use)
UN 2161	?	(UN No. no longer in use) 1,1,3,3-Tetramethyl butyl peroxy-2-ethylhexanoate (UN No. no longer in use)
UN 2162	?	(UN No. no longer in use) Pinane hydroperoxide or Pinanyl hydroperoxide or Pinane hydroperoxide solution (UN No. no longer in use)
UN 2163	?	(UN No. no longer in use) Diacetone alcohol peroxides (UN No. no longer in use)
UN 2164	?	(UN No. no longer in use) Dicetyl peroxydicarbonate (UN No. no longer in use)
UN 2165	?	(UN No. no longer in use) 3,3,6,6,9,9-Hexamethyl-1,2,4,5-tetraoxacyclononane (UN No. no longer in use)
UN 2166	?	(UN No. no longer in use) 3,3,6,6,9,9-Hexamethyl-1,2,4,5-tetraoxacyclononane (UN No. no longer in use)
UN 2167	?	(UN No. no longer in use) 3,3,6,6,9,9-Hexamethyl-1,2,4,5-tetraoxacyclononane (UN No. no longer in use)
UN 2168	?	(UN No. no longer in use) 2,2-Di-(4,4-di-tert-butylperoxycyclohexyl)propane (UN No. no longer in use)
UN 2169	?	(UN No. no longer in use) n-Butyl peroxydicarbonate (UN No. no longer in use)
UN 2170	?	(UN No. no longer in use) n-Butyl peroxydicarbonate (UN No. no longer in use)
UN 2171	?	(UN No. no longer in use) Diisopropylbenzene hydroperoxide or Diisopropylbenzene hydroperoxide solution (UN No. no longer in use)
UN 2172	?	(UN No. no longer in use) 2,5-Dimethyl-2,5-di-(benzoylperoxy)hexane (UN No. no longer in use)
UN 2173	?	(UN No. no longer in use) 2,5-Dimethyl-2,5-di-(benzoylperoxy)hexane (UN No. no longer in use)
UN 2174	?	(UN No. no longer in use) 2,5-Dimethyl-2,5-dihydroperoxyhexane (UN No. no longer in use)
UN 2175	?	(UN No. no longer in use) Diethyl peroxydicarbonate (UN No. no longer in use)
UN 2176	?	(UN No. no longer in use) Di-n-propyl peroxydicarbonate (UN No. no longer in use)
UN 2177	?	(UN No. no longer in use) tert-Butyl peroxyneodecanoate (UN No. no longer in use)
UN 2178	?	(UN No. no longer in use) 2,2-Dihydroperoxy propane (UN No. no longer in use)
UN 2179	?	(UN No. no longer in use) 1,1-Di-(tert-butylperoxy)cyclohexane (UN No. no longer in use)
UN 2180	?	(UN No. no longer in use) 1,1-Di-(tert-butylperoxy)cyclohexane (UN No. no longer in use)
UN 2181	?	(UN No. no longer in use) 1,2-Di-(tert-butylperoxy)cyclohexane (UN No. no longer in use)
UN 2182	?	(UN No. no longer in use) Diisobutyryl peroxide or Isobutyryl peroxide (UN No. no longer in use)
UN 2183	?	(UN No. no longer in use) tert-Butyl peroxycrotonate (UN No. no longer in use)
UN 2184	?	(UN No. no longer in use) Ethyl-3,3-di-(tert-butylperoxy)butyrate (UN No. no longer in use)
UN 2185	?	(UN No. no longer in use) Ethyl-3,3-di-(tert-butylperoxy)butyrate (UN No. no longer in use)
UN 2186	2	Hydrogen chloride, refrigerated liquid
UN 2187	2	Carbon dioxide, refrigerated liquid
UN 2188	2	Arsine
UN 2189	2	Dichlorosilane
UN 2190	2	Oxygen difluoride, compressed
UN 2191	2	Sulfuryl fluoride
UN 2192	2	Germane
UN 2193	2	Hexafluoroethane, compressed or Refrigerant gas R 116
UN 2194	2	Selenium hexafluoride
UN 2195	2	Tellurium hexafluoride
UN 2196	2	Tungsten hexafluoride
UN 2197	2	Hydrogen iodide, anhydrous
UN 2198	2	Phosphorus pentafluoride, compressed
UN 2199	2	Phosphine
UN 2200	2	Propadiene, inhibited

== See also ==
- Lists of UN numbers
