= Propyl chloride =

Chloride name

Propyl chloride may refer to:

- 2-Chloropropane (isopropyl chloride)
- 1-Chloropropane (n-propyl chloride)
