= Allyltrichlorosilane =

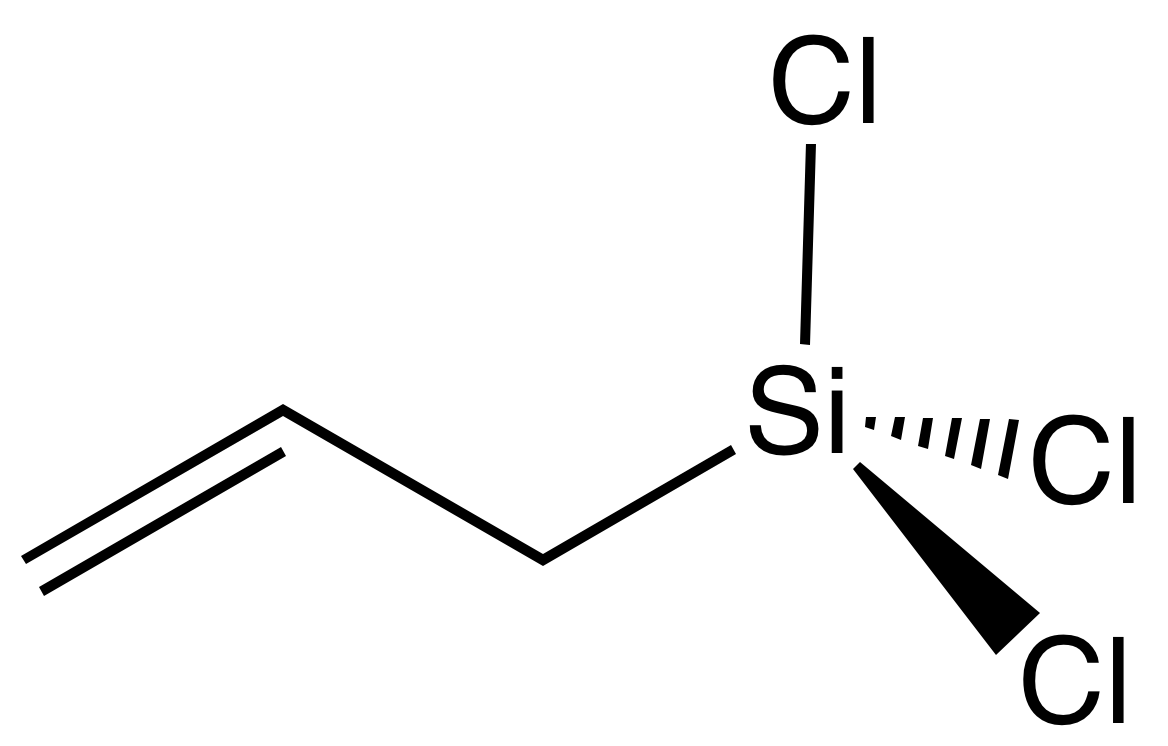

Names
- Preferred IUPAC name Trichloro(prop-2-enyl)silane

Identifiers
CAS Number	107-37-9
3D model (JSmol)	Interactive image
ChemSpider	13862317
ECHA InfoCard	100.003.170
EC Number	203-485-9
PubChem CID	7867
UNII	UB3N98803N
UN number	1724
CompTox Dashboard (EPA)	DTXSID3059347
- InChI: InChI=1S/C3H5Cl3Si/c1-2-3-7(4,5)6/h2H,1,3H2 Key: HKFSBKQQYCMCKO-UHFFFAOYSA-N
- SMILES: C=CC[Si](Cl)(Cl)Cl

Properties
Chemical formula	C_{3}H_{5}Cl_{3}Si
Molar mass	175.51 g·mol^{−1}
Appearance	white solid
Density	1.2011 g/cm^{3}
Melting point	35 °C (95 °F; 308 K)
Boiling point	117.5 °C (243.5 °F; 390.6 K)

Hazards
- GHS labelling
Pictograms	(GHS02: Flammable) (GHS05: Corrosive)
Signal word	Danger
Hazard statements	H225, H314
Precautionary statements	P210, P233, P240, P241, P242, P243, P260, P264, P280, P301+P330+P331, P303+P361+P353, P304+P340, P305+P351+P338, P310, P321, P363, P370+P378, P403+P235, P405, P501
Flash point	35°C
- Except where otherwise noted, data are given for materials in their standard state (at 25 °C [77 °F], 100 kPa). Infobox references

Allyltrichlorosilane is an organosilicon compound with the formula Cl_{3}SiCH_{2}CH=CH_{2}. It is a colorless or white low-melting solid. It was originally prepared by the Direct process, the reaction of allyl chloride with copper-silicon alloy.

The compound is bifunctional, containing reactive trichlorsilyl and allyl groups. The SiCl_{3} group undergoes the usual alcoholysis to give the trialkxoyallylsilane. In the presence of Lewis bases, the reagent allylates aldehydes.
