= Methyl trichloroacetate =

Methyl ester chemical compound

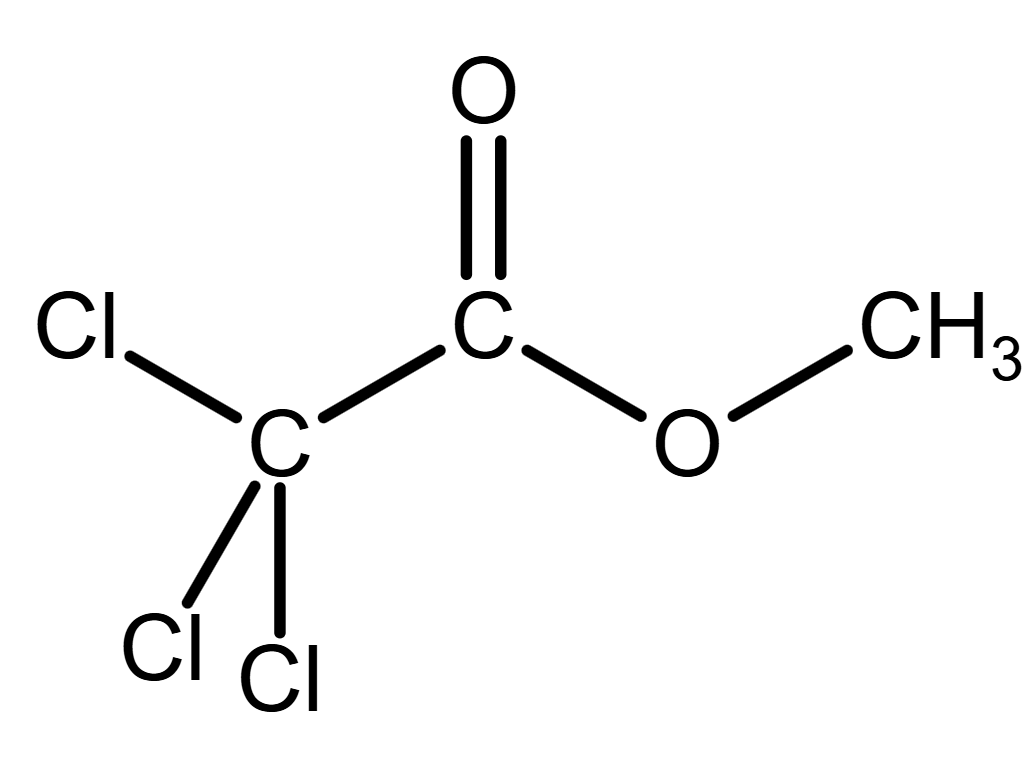

Names
- IUPAC name Methyl 2,2,2-trichloroacetate
- Other names: Trichloroacetic acid methyl ester; Methyl trichloroethanoate

Identifiers
| CAS Number | 598-99-2 |
| 3D model (JSmol) | Interactive image |
| ChemSpider | 11246 |
| ECHA InfoCard | 100.009.056 |
| EC Number | 209-960-7 |
| PubChem CID | 11739 |
| UNII | N9HBT62EHK |
| UN number | 2533 |
| CompTox Dashboard (EPA) | DTXSID0060517 |
- InChI: InChI=1S/C3H3Cl3O2/c1-8-2(7)3(4,5)6/h1H3 Key: VHFUHRXYRYWELT-UHFFFAOYSA-N
- SMILES: COC(=O)C(Cl)(Cl)Cl

Properties
| Chemical formula | C_{3}H_{3}Cl_{3}O_{2} |
| Molar mass | 177.41 g·mol^{−1} |
| Appearance | Colorless liquid |
| Odor | Sweet, fruity; pungent |
| Density | 1.488 g/mL |
| Melting point | −18 °C (0 °F; 255 K) |
| Boiling point | 152–153 °C (306–307 °F; 425–426 K) |
| Solubility in water | Insoluble |
| Solubility | Soluble in organic solvents |
| log P | 2.03 |
| Vapor pressure | 4.3 mmHg |
| Refractive index (n_{D}) | 1.455 |

Hazards
- Occupational safety and health (OHS/OSH)
| Main hazards | Toxic, serious eye irritation |
- GHS labelling
| Pictograms | (GHS07: Exclamation mark) |
| Signal word | Warning |
| Hazard statements | H227, H302, H312, H315, H319, H331, H335 |
| Precautionary statements | P261, P264, P264+P265, P271, P280, P302+P352, P304+P340, P305+P351+P338, P319, P321, P332+P317, P337+P317, P362+P364, P403+P233, P405, P501 |
| NFPA 704 (fire diamond) | 2 2 0 |
| Flash point | 73 °C (163 °F; 346 K) |
- Except where otherwise noted, data are given for materials in their standard state (at 25 °C [77 °F], 100 kPa). Infobox references

Methyl trichloroacetate is an organochlorine compound with the chemical formula CCl_{3}COOCH_{3}. It is a colorless liquid. It is the methyl ester of trichloroacetic acid.

== Synthesis ==
Methyl trichloroacetate can be synthesized by an esterification reaction between trichloroacetic acid and methanol in the presence of an acid as a catalyst (e.g. sulfuric acid).

CCl_{3}COOH + CH_{3}OH → CCl_{3}COOCH_{3} + H_{2}O

== Uses ==
Methyl trichloroacetate is primarily used in organic synthesis, especially as an intermediate in the production of various pharmaceuticals and agrochemicals.

== Reactions ==
Methyl trichloroacetate methylates carboxylic acids with the loss of chloroform and carbon dioxide. Direct fluorination of liquid methyl trichloroacetate produces fluoromethyl trichloroacetate CCl_{3}COOCH_{2}F and difluoromethyl trichloroacetate CCl_{3}COOCHF_{2}.

== Hazards ==
Methyl trichloroacetate possesses hazards typical of chlorinated organic compounds, including toxicity and environmental hazards. It can cause skin and respiratory irritation and serious eye irritation. It is toxic when inhaled.
