= 1-Octanethiol =

Names
- Preferred IUPAC name Octane-1-thiol
- Other names: 1-Mercaptooctane; Octyl mercaptan; n-Octyl mercaptan; Mercaptan C8

Identifiers
CAS Number	111-88-6
3D model (JSmol)	Interactive image
ChEBI	CHEBI:188351
ChemSpider	7852
ECHA InfoCard	100.003.562
PubChem CID	8144
UNII	42GO2PA46L
CompTox Dashboard (EPA)	DTXSID4026894
- InChI: InChI=1S/C8H18S/c1-2-3-4-5-6-7-8-9/h9H,2-8H2,1H3 Key: KZCOBXFFBQJQHH-UHFFFAOYSA-N
- SMILES: CCCCCCCCS

Properties
Chemical formula	C_{8}H_{18}S
Molar mass	146.29 g·mol^{−1}
Density	0.843 g/mL
Melting point	−49 °C (−56 °F; 224 K)
Boiling point	197–200 °C (387–392 °F; 470–473 K)

Hazards
- GHS labelling
Pictograms	(GHS07: Exclamation mark) (GHS09: Environmental hazard)
Signal word	Warning
Hazard statements	H317, H410
Precautionary statements	P273, P280, P302+P352
- Except where otherwise noted, data are given for materials in their standard state (at 25 °C [77 °F], 100 kPa). Infobox references

1-Octanethiol, also called 1-mercaptooctane, is an organic compound.

The National Institute for Occupational Safety and Health in the United States considers this compound to be an occupational hazard. Exposure to this compound can affect the eyes, skin, respiratory system, blood, and central nervous system, and lead to irritation to the eyes, skin, nose, and throat; lassitude; cyanosis; increased respiration; nausea; drowsiness; headache; and vomiting.
