= 2-Methyl-2-heptanethiol =

Names
- Preferred IUPAC name 2-Methylheptane-2-thiol
- Other names 2-Methyl-2-heptanethiol tert-Octyl mercaptan tert-Octanethiol

Identifiers
CAS Number	763-20-2
3D model (JSmol)	Interactive image
ChemSpider	63009
PubChem CID	69810
UNII	SWR39B4RNK
UN number	3023
CompTox Dashboard (EPA)	DTXSID9075290
- InChI: InChI=1S/C8H18S/c1-4-5-6-7-8(2,3)9/h9H,4-7H2,1-3H3 Key: KSTAKRCVPORMCA-UHFFFAOYSA-N
- SMILES: CCCCCC(C)(C)S

Properties
Chemical formula	C_{8}H_{18}S
Molar mass	146.29 g·mol^{−1}
Appearance	Straw-colored liquid
Density	0.85
Melting point	−74 °C (−101 °F; 199 K)
Boiling point	155 °C (311 °F; 428 K)

Hazards
Flash point	46 °C (115 °F; 319 K) open cup
- Except where otherwise noted, data are given for materials in their standard state (at 25 °C [77 °F], 100 kPa). Infobox references

2-Methyl-2-heptanethiol is an organic compound classified as a thiol. It is a straw-colored liquid with a strong, obnoxious odor.

It is used as a lubricant additive and in polymer modification.

The chemical is one of the tertiary aliphatic mercaptans (thiols) synthesized from petroleum, as described in a 1950 paper. Initial research postulated they could be used as lubricant additives, ore flotation collectors, vulcanization accelerators, fungicides, and nonionic detergents.
