= Hydroxybenzotriazole =

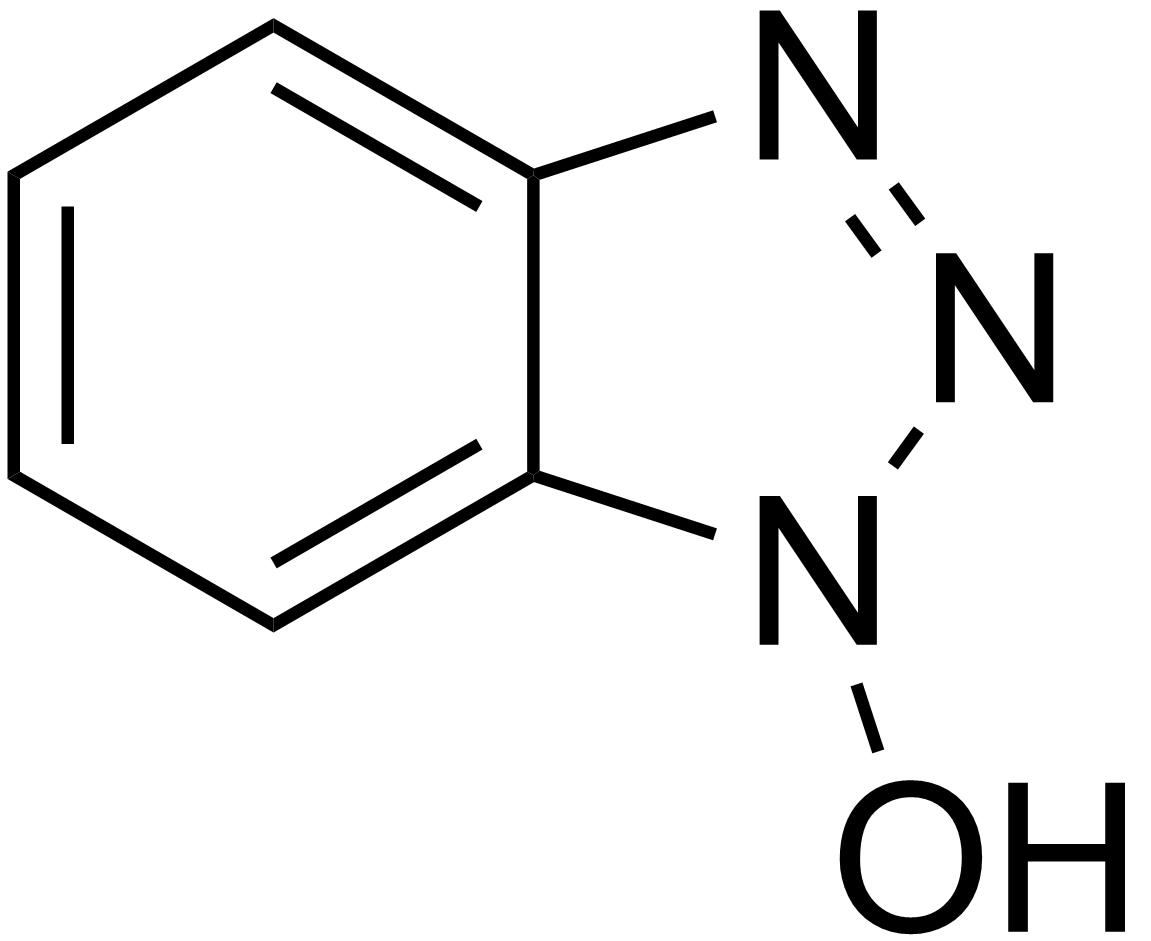

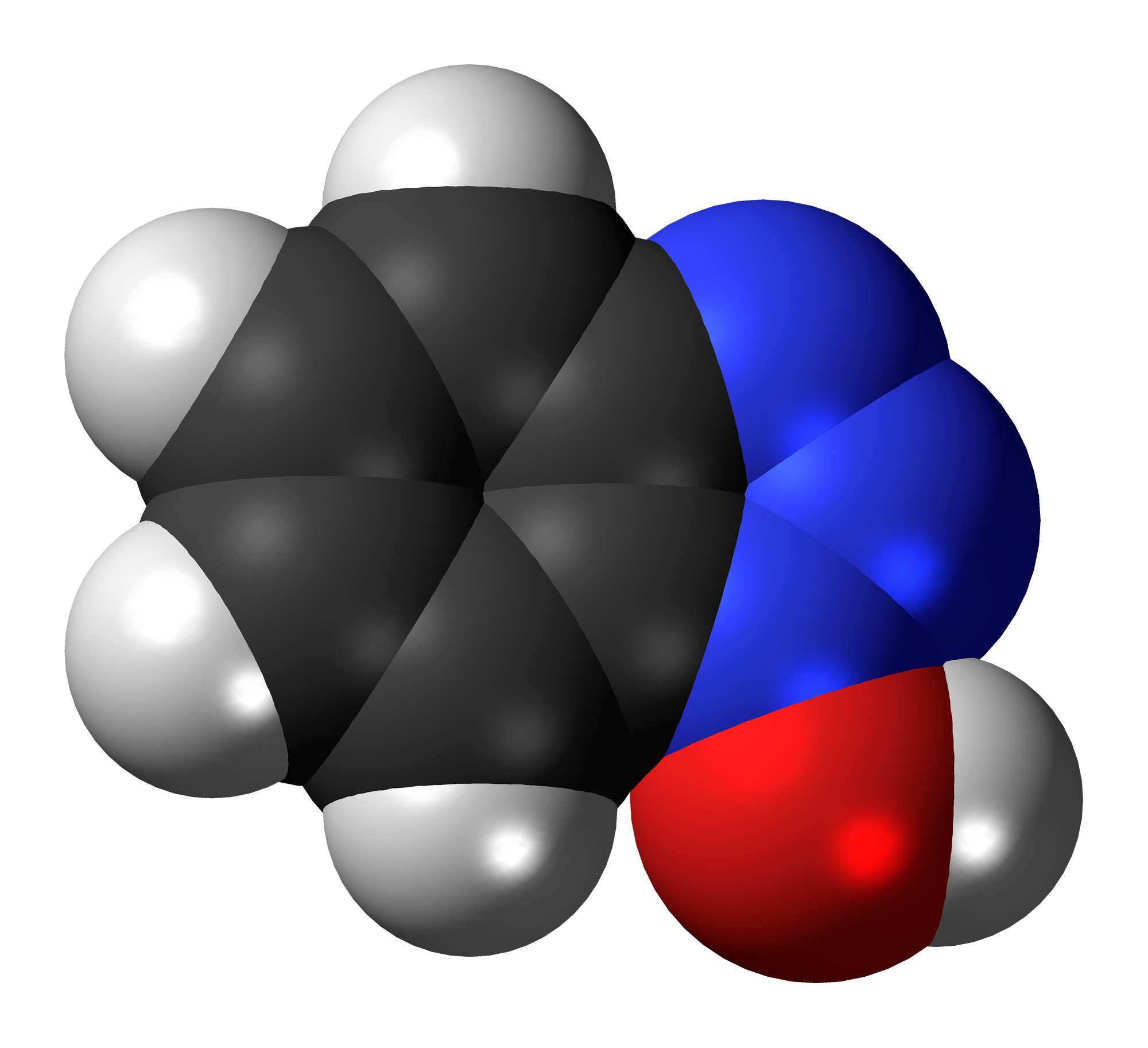

Names
- Preferred IUPAC name 1H-1,2,3-Benzotriazol-1-ol
- Other names N-Hydroxybenzotriazole; HOBt

Identifiers
CAS Number	2592-95-2; (monohydrate): 80029-43-2; (hydrate): 123333-53-9
3D model (JSmol)	Interactive image
ChemSpider	68282
ECHA InfoCard	100.018.173
EC Number	219-989-7; (monohydrate): 602-929-2
PubChem CID	75771; (monohydrate): 2796029
UNII	A2T929DMG4; (monohydrate): S72K7GY45F
CompTox Dashboard (EPA)	DTXSID3044627
- InChI: InChI=1S/C6H5N3O/c10-9-6-4-2-1-3-5(6)7-8-9/h1-4,10H Key: ASOKPJOREAFHNY-UHFFFAOYSA-N; InChI=1/C6H5N3O/c10-9-6-4-2-1-3-5(6)7-8-9/h1-4,10H Key: ASOKPJOREAFHNY-UHFFFAOYAP
- SMILES: n1nn(O)c2ccccc12

Properties
Chemical formula	C_{6}H_{5}N_{3}O
Molar mass	135.1234 g mol^{−1} (anhydrous)
Melting point	156 to 159 °C (313 to 318 °F; 429 to 432 K) (decomposes)

Hazards
- GHS labelling
Pictograms	(GHS01: Explosive)
Signal word	Danger
Hazard statements	H203
Precautionary statements	P210, P230, P240, P250, P280, P370+P380, P372, P373, P401, P501
- Except where otherwise noted, data are given for materials in their standard state (at 25 °C [77 °F], 100 kPa). verify (what is ?) Infobox references

Hydroxybenzotriazole (abbreviated HOBt) is an organic compound with the formula C_{6}H_{4}N_{3}OH. It is a derivative of benzotriazole. It is a white crystalline powder, which as a commercial product contains some water (~11.7% wt as the HOBt monohydrate crystal). Anhydrous HOBt is explosive. It is mainly used to suppress the racemization and to improve the efficiency of peptide synthesis.

== Use in peptide synthesis ==

Automated peptide synthesis involves the condensation of the amino group of protected amino acids with the activated ester. HOBt is used to produce such activated esters which react with amines at ambient temperature to give amides.

HOBt is also used for the synthesis of amides from carboxylic acids aside from amino acids. These substrates may not be convertible to the acyl chlorides.

== Safety ==
Due to reclassification as UN0508, a class 1.3C explosive, hydroxybenzotriazole and its monohydrate crystal are no longer allowed to be transported by sea or air as per 49CFR (USDOT hazardous materials regulations). However, UNECE draft proposal ECE/TRANS/WP.15/AC.1/HAR/2009/1 has been circulated to UN delegates and, if implemented, would amend current regulations thus allowing for the monohydrate crystal to be shipped under the less-stringent code of UN3474 as a class 4.1 desensitized explosive. HOBt was demonstrated to not exhibit dermal corrosion or irritation but did exhibit eye irritation. The sensitization potential of HOBt was shown to be low (non-sensitizing at 1% in LLNA testing according to OECD 429).
