= Pentachloroaniline =

Names
- Preferred IUPAC name 2,3,4,5,6-pentachloroaniline
- Other names Benzenamine, pentachloroaminobenzene

Identifiers
CAS Number	527-20-8
3D model (JSmol)	Interactive image
ChEMBL	ChEMBL1904605
ChemSpider	10243
ECHA InfoCard	100.007.647
EC Number	208-410-3
PubChem CID	10693
UNII	UW5QVL647I
CompTox Dashboard (EPA)	DTXSID4037584
- InChI: InChI=1S/C6H2Cl5N/c7-1-2(8)4(10)6(12)5(11)3(1)9/h12H2 Key: KHCZSJXTDDHLGJ-UHFFFAOYSA-N
- SMILES: C1(=C(C(=C(C(=C1Cl)Cl)Cl)Cl)Cl)N

Properties
Chemical formula	C_{6}H_{2}Cl_{5}N
Molar mass	265.34 g·mol^{−1}
Appearance	yellow crystalline solid
Density	1.75 g/cm³
Melting point	−43.8 °C (−46.8 °F; 229.3 K)
Boiling point	81.6 °C (178.9 °F; 354.8 K)
Solubility in water	practically insoluble

Hazards
- GHS labelling
Pictograms	(GHS07: Exclamation mark) (GHS02: Flammable)
Signal word	Danger
- Except where otherwise noted, data are given for materials in their standard state (at 25 °C [77 °F], 100 kPa). Infobox references

Pentachloroanilin is a chemical compound from the group of chloroanilines. Its chemical formula is C_{6}H_{2}Cl_{5}N. Pentachloroaniline occurs as a derivative of pentachloronitrobenzene.

== Synthesis ==
Pentachloroaniline can be obtained by reducing pentachloronitrobenzene with tin, hydrochloric acid, and ethanol. It is also formed by the action of chlorine on an ethereal solution of symmetrical m-dichloroaniline.

== Physical characteristics ==
Pentachloroaniline is a yellow crystalline solid, practically insoluble in water, but readily dissolves in organic solvents. Highly flammable.

== Uses ==
Pentachloroaniline is highly important in the industrial field, where it is utilized in various ways. Belonging to the aniline group, which comprises substances such as aniline and chloroanilines, it is employed as a dye and as an intermediate in the synthesis of plasticizers and pesticides. Additionally, it is involved in rubber production and functions as a flame retardant.

== See also ==
- Hexachlorobenzene
- Pentabromotoluene
- Pentachlorobenzene
- Pentafluorotoluene
