= Poly(pentafluorophenyl acrylate) =

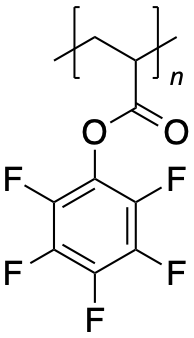

Identifiers
CAS Number	71195-86-3
PubChem CID	2775973

Properties
Chemical formula	(C_{9}H_{3}F_{5}O_{2})_{n}
Molar mass	variable
Appearance	white solid
- Except where otherwise noted, data are given for materials in their standard state (at 25 °C [77 °F], 100 kPa). Infobox references

Poly(pentafluorophenyl acrylate) (variously abbreviated PPFPA, PolyPFPA, PPfpA, or PolyPfpA) is a highly fluorinated polymer. It features the pentafluorophenyl ester functionality, from which its properties and applications result. It is most commonly used in post-polymerization modification to synthesize functional polyacrylamides or polyacrylates. As such, it is advantageous to poly(N-acryloyl succinimide) due to its broader solubility in organic solvents as well as its higher stability towards hydrolysis.

== Synthesis ==
Commonly poly(pentafluorophenyl acrylate) is synthesized by free radical polymerization of the monomer pentafluorophenyl acrylate.

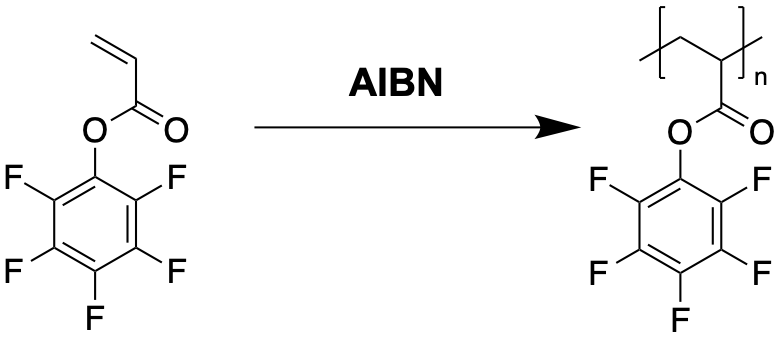
Synthesis of PPFPA

Additionally, pentafluorophenyl acrylate can be successfully polymerized by RAFT polymerization yield homopolymers, copolymers, or block copolymers.

It has been shown that poly(pentafluorophenyl acrylate) can also be prepared by pulsed plasma deposition.

== Chemical properties ==
=== Reactivity ===
Poly(pentafluorophenyl acrylate) is a polymeric active ester and hence features an inherent reactivity towards nucleophiles such as amines. It is therefore used in the preparation of polyacrylamides by reacting it with amines.

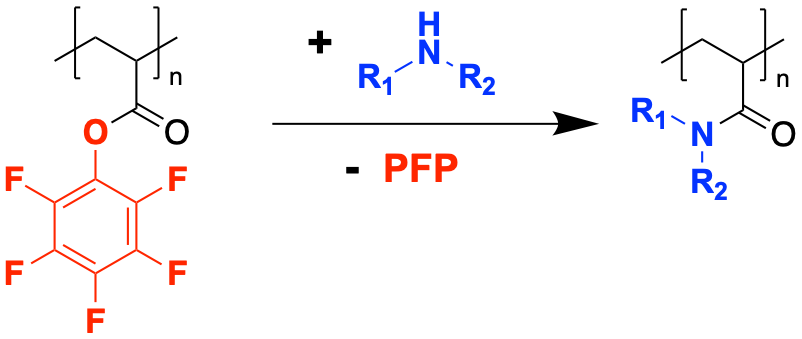
Post-polymerization modification of PPFPA

Poly(pentafluorophenyl acrylate) can also be used in a transesterification by reacting it with alcohols when auxiliary DMAP and DMF are used, allowing for the synthesis of polyacrylate homopolymers and copolymers.

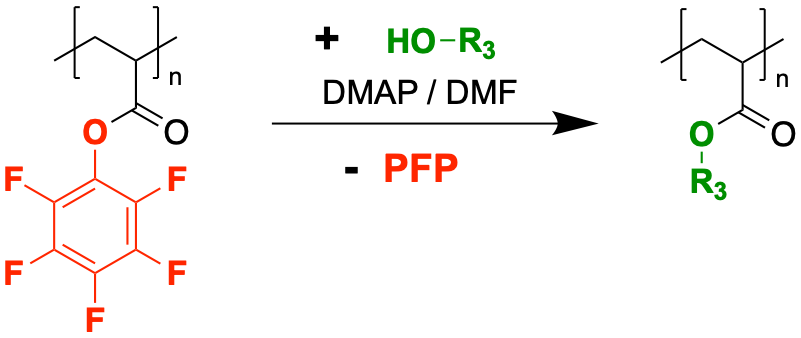
Transesterification of PPFPA

=== Low refractive index polymers ===
Polymers are known for featuring low refractive indices typically in the range from 1.3 to 1.8, with fluorinated polymers exhibiting refractive indices in the range from 1.3 to 1.4. As such, poly(pentafluorophenyl acrylate) has been explored as a crosslinkable cladding for optical fibers when copolymerized with glycidyl methacrylate.

== Applications ==
Poly(pentafluorophenyl acrylate) finds application in the synthesis of functional polymers by post-polymerization modification. Applications of the resulting polyacrylamides can be found in drug delivery, functional surfaces, and nanoparticles.
