= Acetoxy group =

Chemical group (–OC(O)CH3)

The structure of the acetoxy group blue.

In organic chemistry, the acetoxy group (abbr. AcO– or –OAc; IUPAC name: acetyloxy), is a functional group with the formula −OCOCH_{3} and the structure −O−C(=O)−CH_{3}. As the -oxy suffix implies, it differs from the acetyl group (−C(=O)−CH_{3}) by the presence of an additional oxygen atom. The name acetoxy is the short form of acetyl-oxy.

== Functionality ==
An acetoxy group may be used as a protection for an alcohol functionality in a synthetic route although the protecting group itself is called an acetyl group.

=== Alcohol protection ===
There are several options of introducing an acetoxy functionality in a molecule from an alcohol (in effect protecting the alcohol by acetylation):

- Acetyl halide, such as acetyl chloride in the presence of a base like triethylamine
- Activated ester form of acetic acid, such as a N-hydroxysuccinimide ester, although this is not advisable due to higher costs and difficulties.
- Acetic anhydride in the presence of base with a catalyst such as pyridine with a bit of DMAP added.

An alcohol is not a particularly strong nucleophile and, when present, more powerful nucleophiles like amines will react with the above-mentioned reagents in preference to the alcohol.

=== Alcohol deprotection ===
For deprotection (regeneration of the alcohol)

- Aqueous base (pH >9)
- Aqueous acid (pH <2), may have to be heated
- Anhydrous base such as sodium methoxide in methanol. Very useful when a methyl ester of a carboxylic acid is also present in the molecule, as it will not hydrolyze it like an aqueous base would. (Same also holds with an ethoxide in ethanol with ethyl esters)

== See also ==
- Acetate#Esters
- Acetyl group
- Acetylation
