= Hexafluorobenzene =

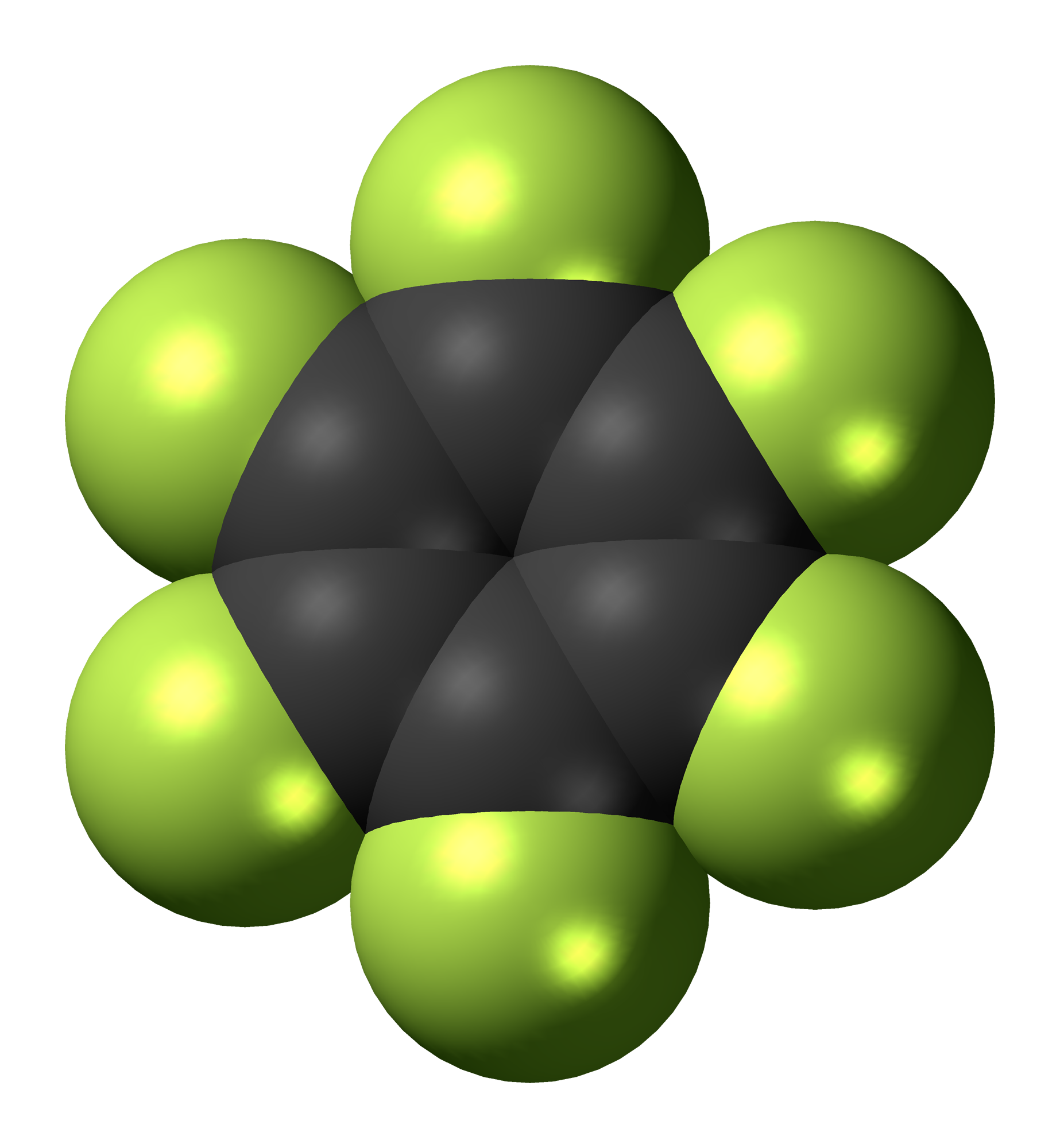

Names
- Preferred IUPAC name Hexafluorobenzene
- Other names Perfluorobenzene

Identifiers
CAS Number	392-56-3
3D model (JSmol)	Interactive image
Abbreviations	HFB
Beilstein Reference	1683438
ChEBI	CHEBI:38589
ChemSpider	13836549
ECHA InfoCard	100.006.252
EC Number	206-876-2
Gmelin Reference	101976
PubChem CID	9805
UNII	CMC18T611K
CompTox Dashboard (EPA)	DTXSID5043924
- InChI: InChI=1S/C6F6/c7-1-2(8)4(10)6(12)5(11)3(1)9 Key: ZQBFAOFFOQMSGJ-UHFFFAOYSA-N; InChI=1/C6F6/c7-1-2(8)4(10)6(12)5(11)3(1)9 Key: ZQBFAOFFOQMSGJ-UHFFFAOYAJ
- SMILES: Fc1c(F)c(F)c(F)c(F)c1F

Properties
Chemical formula	C_{6}F_{6}
Molar mass	186.056 g·mol^{−1}
Appearance	Colorless liquid
Density	1.6120 g/cm^{3}
Melting point	5.2 °C (41.4 °F; 278.3 K)
Boiling point	80.3 °C (176.5 °F; 353.4 K)
Refractive index (n_{D})	1.377
Viscosity	cP (1.200 mPa·s) (20 °C)
Dipole moment	0.00 D (gas)

Hazards
- GHS labelling
Pictograms	(GHS02: Flammable)
Signal word	Warning
Hazard statements	H225
Precautionary statements	P210, P233, P240, P241, P242, P243
Flash point	10 °C (50 °F; 283 K)

Related compounds
Related compounds	Benzene; Hexachlorobenzene; Hexabromobenzene; Hexaiodobenzene; Polytetrafluoroethylene; Perfluorotoluene
- Except where otherwise noted, data are given for materials in their standard state (at 25 °C [77 °F], 100 kPa). verify (what is ?) Infobox references

Hexafluorobenzene, HFB or perfluorobenzene is an organofluorine compound with the chemical formula C_{6}F_{6}. In this derivative of benzene, all hydrogen atoms have been replaced by fluorine atoms. The technical uses of the compound are limited, although it has some specialized uses in the laboratory owing to distinctive spectroscopic properties.

== Geometry of the aromatic ring ==
Hexafluorobenzene stands somewhat aside in the perhalogenbenzenes. If a perhalogenated benzene ring were to remain planar, then geometric constraints would force adjacent halogens closer than their associated nonbonding radius. Consequently the benzene ring buckles, reducing p-orbital overlap and aromaticity to avoid the steric clash. Perfluorobenzene is an exception: as shown in the following table, two fluorines are small enough to avoid collision, retaining planarity and full aromaticity.

Formula	Name	Inter-halogen distance (if planar)	Nonbonding radius×2	Consequent symmetry
C_{6}F_{6}	Hexafluorobenzene	279 pm	270 pm	D_{6h}
C_{6}Cl_{6}	Hexachlorobenzene	312 pm	360 pm	D_{3d}
C_{6}Br_{6}	Hexabromobenzene	327 pm	390 pm	D_{3d}
C_{6}I_{6}	Hexaiodobenzene	354 pm	430 pm	D_{3d}

== Synthesis ==
The direct synthesis of hexafluorobenzene from benzene and fluorine has not been useful. Instead it is prepared via the Finkelstein reaction of perchlorobenzene and potassium fluoride:

C_{6}Cl_{6} + 6 KF → C_{6}F_{6} + 6 KCl

Antimony fluoride instead adds to the ring, breaking aromaticity.

In principle, various halofluoromethanes pyrolyze to hexafluorobenzene, but commercialization was still in the initial stages in 2000.

== Reactions ==
Hexafluorobenzene easily undergoes nucleophilic aromatic substitution. One example is its reaction with sodium hydrosulfide to afford pentafluorothiophenol:

C_{6}F_{6} + NaSH → C_{6}F_{5}SH + NaF

The further reaction of pentafluorophenyl derivatives has long been puzzling, because the non-fluorine substituent has no effect. The second new substituent is always directed para, to form a 1,4-disubstituted-2,3,5,6-tetrafluorobenzene. In the table below references to examples of this reaction are collected.

Hexafluorobenzene is thus a comonomer in certain heavily fluorinated heat-resistant polyethers' synthesis.

UV light causes gaseous HFB to isomerize to hexafluoro derivative of Dewar benzene.

== Laboratory applications ==
Hexafluorobenzene has been used as a reporter molecule to investigate tissue oxygenation in vivo. It is exceedingly hydrophobic, but exhibits high gas solubility with ideal liquid gas interactions. Since molecular oxygen is paramagnetic it causes ^{19}F NMR spin lattice relaxation (R1): specifically a linear dependence R1= a + bpO_{2} has been reported. HFB essentially acts as molecular amplifier, since the solubility of oxygen is greater than in water, but thermodynamics require that the pO2 in the HFB rapidly equilibrates with the surrounding medium. HFB has a single narrow ^{19}F NMR signal and the spin lattice relaxation rate is highly sensitive to changes in pO_{2}, yet minimally responsive to temperature. HFB is typically injected directly into a tissue and ^{19}F NMR may be used to measure local oxygenation. It has been extensively applied to examine changes in tumor oxygenation in response to interventions such as breathing hyperoxic gases or as a consequence of vascular disruption. MRI measurements of HFB based on 19F relaxation have been shown to correlate with radiation response of tumors. HFB has been used as a gold standard for investigating other potential prognostic biomarkers of tumor oxygenation such as BOLD (Blood Oxygen Level Dependent), TOLD (Tissue Oxygen Level Dependent) and MOXI (MR oximetry) A 2013 review of applications has been published.

HFB has been evaluated as standard in fluorine-19 NMR spectroscopy.

== Toxicity ==
Hexafluorobenzene may cause eye and skin irritation, respiratory and digestive tract irritation and can cause central nervous system depression per MSDS. The National Institute for Occupational Safety and Health (NIOSH) lists it in its Registry of Toxic Effects of Chemical Substances as neurotoxicant.

== References to reactions of pentafluorophenyl derivatives ==
In the table below references are collected for a number of reactions, generally written as:

$$\ce{RC6F5 \ + \ X^{-} \ -> \ RC6H4X \ + \ F^{-}}$$

The substituent already present "R" is mentioned in the first column, the used nucleophiles in the first row.

R \ X	OH^{-}	CH_{3}O^{-}	C_{2}H_{5}O^{-}	C_{6}F_{5}O^{-}	SH^{-}	CH_{3}S^{-}	C_{6}H_{5}S^{-}	C_{6}Cl_{5}S^{-}	C_{6}F_{5}S^{-}	NH_{3}	RNH_{2}	R_{2}NH	N_{2}H_{4}	C_{6}F_{5}NHR	N_{3}^{-}	(CH_{2})_{5}N
Br																
Cl																
H																
I																
CF_{3}																
C_{2}F_{5}																
CF(CF_{3})_{2}																
C(CF_{3})_{3}																
C_{6}H_{5}																
C_{6}F_{5}																
C(O)H																
CN																
COOR																
COCH_{3}																
COCF_{3}																
NO																
NO_{2}																
NHCH_{3}																
N_{3}																
OH																
C_{6}F_{5}S																
SH																
SO_{3}R																
(C_{6}H_{5})_{2}P																
(C_{6}H_{5})_{2}PO																

== See also ==
- Pentafluorobenzene
- Hexabromobenzene
- Pentafluoromethylbenzene
