= Perfluorinated compound =

Type of organic chemical

Pentafluorophenol, a perfluorinated compound.

A perfluorinated compound (PFC) or perfluoro compound is an organofluorine compound that lacks C-H bonds. Many perfluorinated compounds have properties that are quite different from their C-H containing analogues. Common functional groups in PFCs are −OH, perfluoroaldehydes and perfluoroketones =O, −CO−OH, −Cl, −O−, and −SO_{2}−OH. Electrofluorination is the predominant method for PFC production. Due to their chemical stability, some of these perfluorinated compounds bioaccumulate.

== Applications ==
One class of perfluorinated compounds, the fluorosurfactants, are widely used in the production of teflon (PTFE) and related fluorinated polymers. They also have been used to confer hydrophobicity and stain-resistance to fabrics. They are components of fire-fighting foam. Fluorosurfactants (PFAS) reduce surface tension by concentrating at the liquid-air interface due to the lipophobicity of polyfluorocarbons.

Chlorofluorocarbons are also perfluorinated compounds, many of which were formerly used as refrigerants (Freon) until they were implicated in ozone degradation.

== Production ==
A common industrial method for synthesizing perflurocompounds is electrofluorination.

Some perfluoroheteroarenes are produced via saturative addition and then defluorinative rearomatization.

== Examples by functional group ==
=== Perfluorinated alkyl halides ===
- Trifluoroiodomethane, an alkylating agent.
- Pentafluoroethyl iodide, an alkylating agent.
- Perfluorooctyl bromide, or perflubron, a contrast medium for magnetic resonance imaging (MRI), computed tomography (CT) and sonography; fluid used in liquid breathing.
- Dichlorodifluoromethane, a refrigerant.

=== Perfluoroalkenes ===
- Tetrafluoroethylene, precursor to polytetrafluoroethylene (PTFE).
- Chlorotrifluoroethylene, refrigerant and precursor to polychlorotrifluoroethylene (PCTFE).
- Dichlorodifluoroethylene (three isomers).

=== Perfluoroethers and epoxides ===
- Hexafluoropropylene oxide, precursor to perfluoromethyl vinyl ether (CF_{2}=CFOCF_{3}), the monomer precursor to Krytox, perfluorinated polyether used in special oils and greases.

=== Perfluoroalcohols ===
- Nonafluoro-tert-butyl alcohol
- Perfluorotriethylcarbinol
- Pentafluorophenol, a moderately strong acid.

Primary and secondary perfluorinated alcohols are unstable with respect to dehydrofluorination.

=== Perfluoroamines ===
- Perfluorotripentylamine (and related derivatives) are found in Fluorinert, electronic coolants.

=== Perfluoroketones ===
- Hexafluoroacetone, a building block in organofluorine chemistry.

=== Perfluorocarboxylic acids ===
- Trifluoroacetic acid, a moderately strong acid useful in organic chemistry.
- Heptafluorobutyric acid, a moderately strong acid that is useful in organic and analytical chemistry.
- Pentafluorobenzoic acid, a moderately strong acid of interest in research community.
- Perfluorooctanoic acid (PFOA), a surfactant used to make fluoropolymers such as Teflon.
- Perfluorononanoic acid (PFNA), a surfactant in the emulsion polymerization of fluoropolymers, like PFOA.

=== Perfluoronitriles and isonitriles ===
- Trifluoromethylisocyanide, the simplest perfluorinated isonitrile.
- Trifluoromethylacetonitrile, the simplest perfluorinated nitrile.

=== Perfluorosulfonic acids and related derivatives ===
- Triflic acid, a useful strong acid
- perfluorobutanesulfonic acid (PFBS) used as a replacement for PFOS in 3M's reformulated Scotchgard.
- perfluorobutane sulfonamide (FBSA), sulfonamide derivative of PFBS.
- perfluorooctanesulfonyl fluoride (POSF), precursor to PFOS-based compounds.
- perfluorooctanesulfonamide (PFOSA), used in 3M's Scotchgard formulation.
- perfluorooctanesulfonic acid (PFOS), used in the semiconductor industry, 3M's former Scotchgard formulation, and 3M's former fire-fighting foam mixture.

=== Perfluorinated aryl compounds ===
- Li[B(C_{6}F_{5})_{4}], salt of a weakly coordinating anion.
- Pentafluorophenol
- Pentafluorobenzoic acid

== Environmental and health concerns ==
Several environmental and health concerns surround the industrial production and use of perfluoroalkane compounds. The exceptional stability of perfluorinated compounds, while desirable from the applications perspective, is also a cause for environmental and health concerns.

=== Perfluoroalkanes ===
Low-boiling perfluoroalkanes are potent greenhouse gases, in part due to their very long atmospheric lifetime. The environmental concerns for perflurocompounds are similar to chlorofluorocarbons and other halogenated compounds used as refrigerants and fire suppression materials. The history of use, environmental impact, and recommendations for use are included in the Kyoto Protocol.

=== Fluorosurfactants ===
The fluorocarbons PFOA (perfluorooctanoic acid) and PFOS (perfluorooctane sulfonate) have both been investigated by the EU and the United States Environmental Protection Agency (EPA) which regards them being harmful to the environment. Specifically, studies found that PFOS caused "unusual and serious effects in animal toxicity tests, that it was present around the world in humans and wildlife, and that it was highly persistent in the environment." (Similar concerns followed for PFOA.)

Fluorosurfactants tend to bioaccumulate, since they are extremely stable and can be stored in the bodies of humans and animals. Examples include PFOA and PFOS, frequently present in water-resistant textiles and sprays conferring water-resistant properties to textiles and fire-fighting foam. Data from animal studies of PFOA indicate that it can cause several types of tumors and neonatal death and may have toxic effects on the immune, liver, and endocrine systems. As of 2010 data on the human health effects of PFOA were sparse.

As of 2015, the U.S. Air Force had been testing 82 former and active US military installations for fluorosurfactants contained in fire fighting foam. In 2015, PFCs were found in groundwater at Naval Air Station Brunswick, Maine and Grissom Air Reserve Base, Indiana, and in well water at Pease Air Force Base, New Hampshire, where 500 people including children had blood tests as part of a bio-monitoring plan through the state Department of Health and Human Services. The U.S. Department of Defense's research programs have been trying to define nature and extent of PFAS contamination at U.S. military sites, especially in groundwater.

A 2018 report to Congress indicated that "at least 126 drinking water systems on or near military bases" were contaminated with PFAS compounds.

A 2016 study found unsafe levels of fluorosurfactants in 194 out of 4,864 water supplies in 33 U.S. states. Covering two-thirds of drinking water supplies in the United States, the study found thirteen states accounted for 75% of the detections. In order of frequency, these were: California, New Jersey, North Carolina, Alabama, Florida, Pennsylvania, Ohio, New York, Georgia, Minnesota, Arizona, Massachusetts, and Illinois. Firefighting foam was singled out as a major contributor.

== See also ==
- Per- and polyfluoroalkyl substances
- Fluorocarbons
