= Tetrafluorophenyl esters =

Tetrafluorophenyl (TFP) ester chemistry is typically used to attach fluorophores or haptens to the primary amines of biomolecules. They produce the same amide bonds that are formed through conjugation with other amine-reactive groups, such as succinimidyl esters (SE, Hydroxysuccinimide- or NHS-ester), but TFP esters are less susceptible to spontaneous hydrolysis during conjugation reactions. TFP esters are stable for several hours at basic pH, far outlasting succinimidyl esters.

== See also ==
- Pentafluorophenyl esters (PFP)
