= Carboxyfluorescein diacetate succinimidyl ester =

6-Carboxyfluorescein diacetate succinimidyl ester
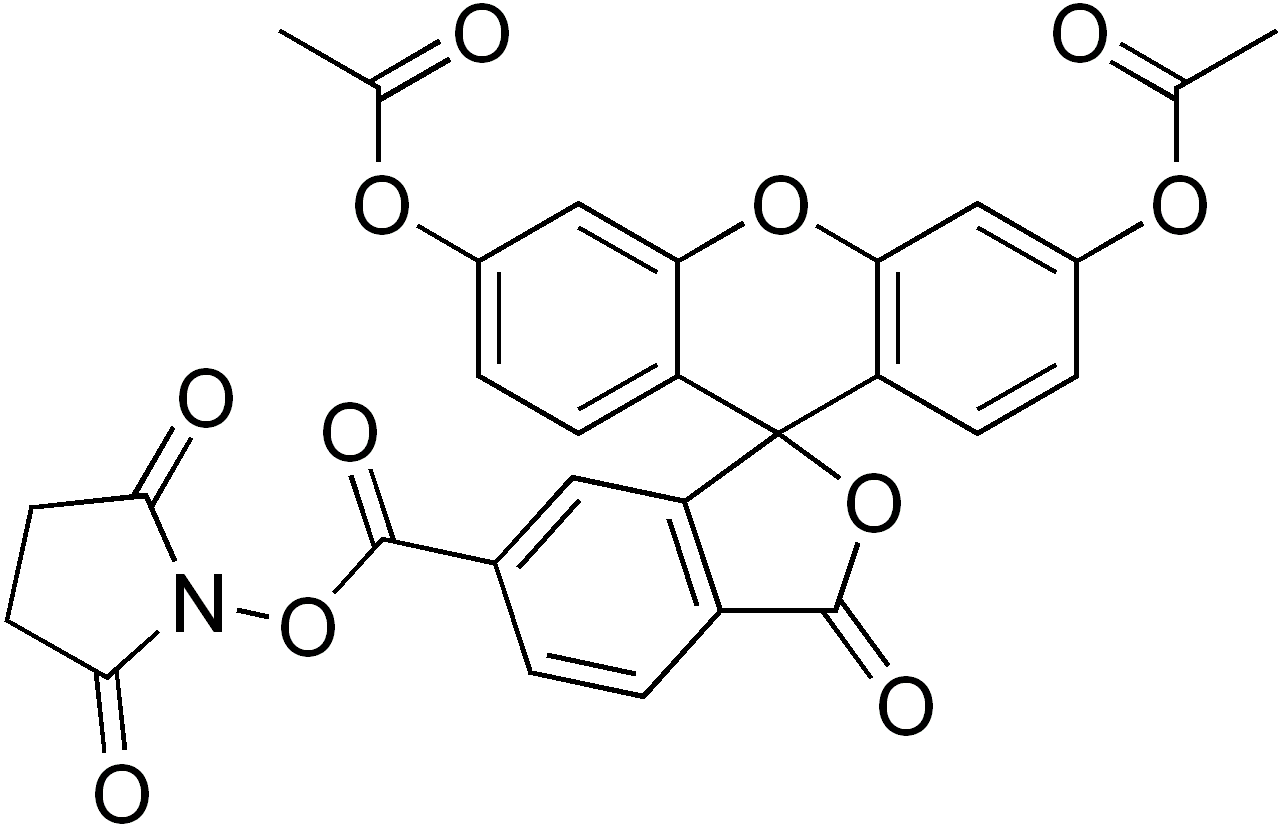

Names
- Preferred IUPAC name 2,5-Dioxopyrrolidin-1-yl 3′,6′-bis(acetyloxy)-3-oxo-3H-spiro[[2]benzofuran-1,9′-xanthene]-6-carboxylate
- Other names CFDA-SE; Carboxyfluorescein diacetate N-succinimidyl ester

Identifiers
CAS Number	150206-15-8; 150347-59-4 (5/6 mixture)
3D model (JSmol)	Interactive image; Interactive image
ChemSpider	4226037
PubChem CID	5048409
UNII	7KQF9Z3Y49
CompTox Dashboard (EPA)	DTXSID80407790
- InChI: InChI=1S/C29H19NO11/c1-14(31)37-17-4-7-20-23(12-17)39-24-13-18(38-15(2)32)5-8-21(24)29(20)22-11-16(3-6-19(22)28(36)40-29)27(35)41-30-25(33)9-10-26(30)34/h3-8,11-13H,9-10H2,1-2H3 Key: JGPOSNWWINVNFV-UHFFFAOYSA-N; InChI=1/C29H19NO11/c1-14(31)37-17-4-7-20-23(12-17)39-24-13-18(38-15(2)32)5-8-21(24)29(20)22-11-16(3-6-19(22)28(36)40-29)27(35)41-30-25(33)9-10-26(30)34/h3-8,11-13H,9-10H2,1-2H3 Key: JGPOSNWWINVNFV-UHFFFAOYAD
- SMILES: O=C(C5=C4C=C(C(ON6C(CCC6=O)=O)=O)C=C5)OC24C3=C(C=C(OC(C)=O)C=C3)OC1=CC(OC(C)=O)=CC=C12; CC(=O)Oc1ccc2c(c1)Oc3cc(ccc3C24c5cc(ccc5C(=O)O4)C(=O)ON6C(=O)CCC6=O)OC(=O)C

Properties
Chemical formula	C_{29}H_{19}NO_{11}
Molar mass	557.467 g·mol^{−1}
- Except where otherwise noted, data are given for materials in their standard state (at 25 °C [77 °F], 100 kPa). verify (what is ?) Infobox references

Carboxyfluorescein diacetate succinimidyl ester (CFDA-SE) is an amine-reactive, cell-permeable dye generally used in animal cell proliferation research. CFDA-SE is a modified CFSE with two hydroxyl groups on its fluorescein moiety replaced with acetates. This change renders the molecule more hydrophobic and cell-permeable at the expense of its fluorescence property. After entering cells by diffusion, CFDA-SE is cleaved by intracellular esterase enzymes to form CFSE. As its reactive succinimidyl ester group is unmodified, CFDA-SE also covalently binds to lysine residues and other amine sources like CFSE.

If a stained cell divides, the dye is divided equally between the two daughter cells, resulting in both new cells having a CFDA-SE concentration approximately 50% that of the mother cell. A cell stained with CFDA-SE can be kept in culture for several days and fluorescence is detectable in cells following up to 8 successive cell divisions. Fluorescence is typically detected using a flow cytometer on the FL1 detector, with each resulting fluorescent peak representing another round of cell division. The area of each peak is representative of the number of cells in a given division cycle. The staining works best with relatively homogeneous cell populations.

High concentrations of the dye are toxic to animal cells; however, concentrations in the region of 10 micromolar are typically sufficient to give strong staining with minimal cell death. Most cell types will excrete a proportion of the dye over the course of the first 24–48 hours following staining. Dye levels should thereafter remain relatively stable in non-dividing cells.

CFDA-SE is often erroneously referred to as CFSE, even in scientific literature.

== See also ==
- Carboxyfluorescein
- Carboxyfluorescein succinimidyl ester
