= 6-Carboxyfluorescein =

Names
- Other names 6-FAM

Identifiers
CAS Number	3301-79-9
3D model (JSmol)	Interactive image
ChEBI	CHEBI:39073
ChEMBL	ChEMBL1614944
ChemSpider	69262
ECHA InfoCard	100.164.295
PubChem CID	76806
UNII	JHJ853P6SM
CompTox Dashboard (EPA)	DTXSID6062965
- InChI: InChI=1S/C21H12O7/c22-11-2-5-14-17(8-11)27-18-9-12(23)3-6-15(18)21(14)16-7-10(19(24)25)1-4-13(16)20(26)28-21/h1-9,22-23H,(H,24,25) Key: BZTDTCNHAFUJOG-UHFFFAOYSA-N; InChI=1/C21H12O7/c22-11-2-5-14-17(8-11)27-18-9-12(23)3-6-15(18)21(14)16-7-10(19(24)25)1-4-13(16)20(26)28-21/h1-9,22-23H,(H,24,25) Key: BZTDTCNHAFUJOG-UHFFFAOYAC
- SMILES: C12C=CC(=O)C=C1Oc3cc(O)ccc3C=2c4cc(C(O)=O)ccc4C(O)=O

Properties
Chemical formula	C_{21}H_{12}O_{7}
Molar mass	376.320 g·mol^{−1}

Hazards
- GHS labelling
Pictograms	(GHS07: Exclamation mark)
Signal word	Warning
Hazard statements	H315, H319, H335
Precautionary statements	P261, P305+P351+P338
- Except where otherwise noted, data are given for materials in their standard state (at 25 °C [77 °F], 100 kPa). verify (what is ?) Infobox references

6-Carboxyfluorescein (6-FAM) is a fluorescent dye with an absorption wavelength of 495 nm and an emission wavelength of 517 nm. A carboxyfluorescein molecule is a fluorescein molecule with a carboxyl group added. They are commonly used as a tracer agents. It is used in the sequencing of nucleic acids and in the labeling of nucleotides.

Commercially available FAM is a mixture of two isomers, 5-FAM and 6-FAM, and the correct name is 5(6)-carboxyfluorescein.

The dyes are membrane-impermeant and can be loaded into cells by microinjection or scrape loading. It can be incorporated into liposomes, and allows for the tracking of liposomes as they pass through the body. In addition, carboxyfluorescein has been used to track division of cells. In vascular plants, 5(6)-carboxyfluorescein can be used as a symplastic tracer. It is able to move through the phloem due to its structural similarity to sucrose. It is typically loaded into the leaves in order to gain access to the phloem. This can be done by scraping, cutting, or weakening the leaf’s cuticle with an herbicide.

Popular derivatives for cell tracing purposes are carboxyfluorescein diacetate succinimidyl ester (CFDA-SE) and carboxyfluorescein succinimidyl ester (CFSE).

== See also ==
- Fluorescein
