= Fluorescein =

Synthetic organic compound used as dye and fluorescent tracer

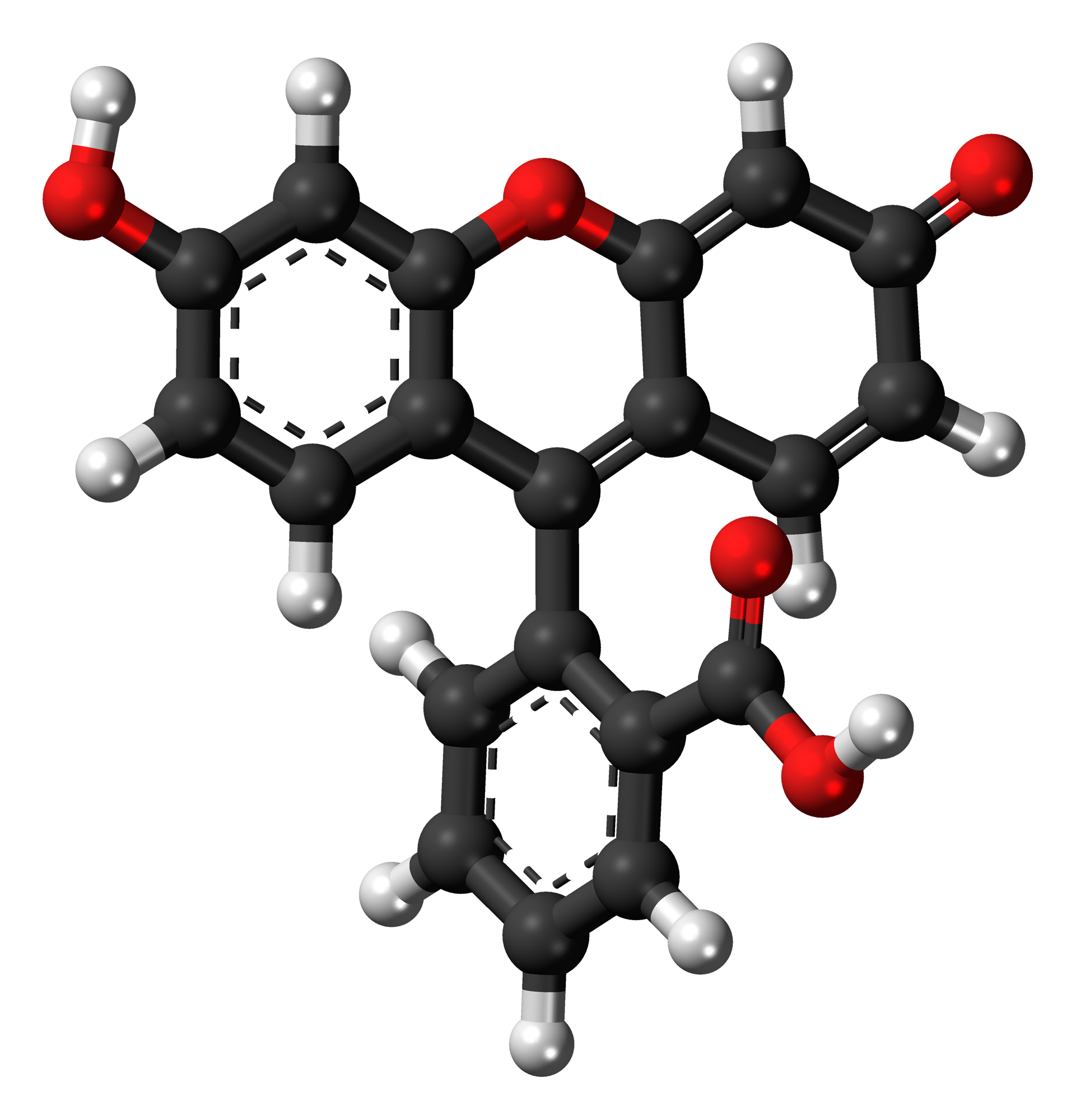

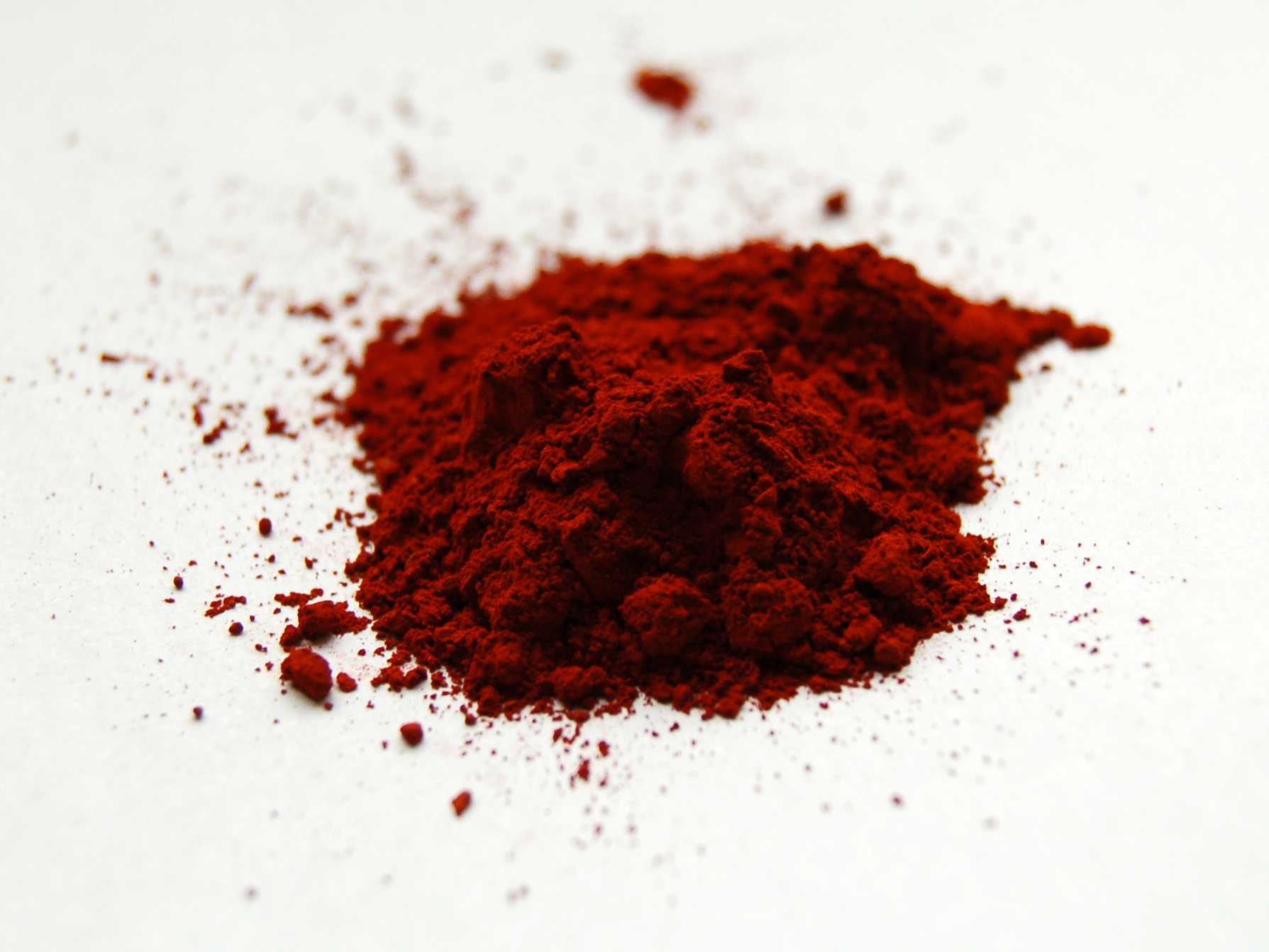

Names
Pronunciation	/flʊəˈrɛsi.ɪn, flʊəˈrɛsiːn/
- IUPAC name 3′,6′-Dihydroxy-3H-spiro[2-benzofuran-1,9′-xanthen]-3-one
- Other names Resorcinolphthalein, C.I. 45350, solvent yellow 94, D&C yellow no. 7, angiofluor, Japan yellow 201, soap yellow

Identifiers
CAS Number	2321-07-5
3D model (JSmol)	Interactive image
ChEBI	CHEBI:31624
ChEMBL	ChEMBL177756
ChemSpider	15968
DrugBank	DB00693
ECHA InfoCard	100.017.302
EC Number	219-031-8
KEGG	D01261
MeSH	Fluorescein
PubChem CID	16850
UNII	TPY09G7XIR
CompTox Dashboard (EPA)	DTXSID0038887
- InChI: InChI=1S/C20H12O5/c21-11-5-7-15-17(9-11)24-18-10-12(22)6-8-16(18)20(15)14-4-2-1-3-13(14)19(23)25-20/h1-10,21-22H Key: GNBHRKFJIUUOQI-UHFFFAOYSA-N; InChI=1/C20H12O5/c21-11-5-7-15-17(9-11)24-18-10-12(22)6-8-16(18)20(15)14-4-2-1-3-13(14)19(23)25-20/h1-10,21-22H Key: GNBHRKFJIUUOQI-UHFFFAOYAZ
- SMILES: C12C=CC([O-])=CC=1OC3=CC(=O)C=CC3=C2c4ccccc4C(O)=O

Properties
Chemical formula	C_{20}H_{12}O_{5}
Molar mass	332.311 g·mol^{−1}
Melting point	314 to 316 °C (597 to 601 °F; 587 to 589 K)
Solubility in water	Slightly

Pharmacology
ATC code	S01JA01 (WHO)

Hazards
- GHS labelling
Pictograms	(GHS07: Exclamation mark)
Signal word	Warning
Hazard statements	H319
Precautionary statements	P305, P338, P351
- Except where otherwise noted, data are given for materials in their standard state (at 25 °C [77 °F], 100 kPa). verify (what is ?) Infobox references

Fluorescein is an organic compound and dye based on the xanthene tricyclic structural motif, formally belonging to triarylmethane dyes family. It is available as a dark orange/red powder, slightly soluble in water and alcohol. It is used as a fluorescent tracer in many applications.

The color of its aqueous solutions is green by reflection and orange by transmission, and its spectral properties are dependent on pH of the solution. This can be noticed in bubble levels, for example, in which fluorescein is added as a colorant to the alcohol filling the tube, in order to increase the visibility of the air bubble contained within. More concentrated solutions of fluorescein can even appear red because, under these conditions, nearly all incident emission is re-absorbed by the solution.

It is on the World Health Organization's List of Essential Medicines.

== Uses ==
Fluorescein sodium, the sodium salt of fluorescein, is used extensively as a diagnostic tool in the field of ophthalmology and optometry, where topical fluorescein is used in the diagnosis of globe rupture, corneal abrasions, corneal ulcers and herpetic corneal infections. It is also used in rigid gas permeable contact lens fitting to evaluate the tear layer under the lens. It is available as sterile single-use sachets containing lint-free paper applicators soaked in fluorescein sodium solution or as sterile single-use eye drops.

The thyroxine ester of fluorescein is used to quantify the thyroxine concentration in blood.

Fluorescein is also known as a color additive (D&C Yellow no. 7). The disodium salt form of fluorescein is known as uranine or D&C Yellow no. 8. Fluorescein is a precursor to the red dye eosin Y by bromination.

== Safety ==
Oral and intravenous use of fluorescein can cause adverse reactions, including nausea, vomiting, hives, acute hypotension, anaphylaxis and related anaphylactoid reaction, causing cardiac arrest and sudden death due to anaphylactic shock.

Intravenous use has the most reported adverse reactions, including sudden death, but this may reflect greater use rather than greater risk. Both oral and topical uses have been reported to cause anaphylaxis, including one case of anaphylaxis with cardiac arrest (resuscitated) following topical use in an eye drop. Reported rates of adverse reactions vary from 1% to 6%. The higher rates may reflect study populations that include a higher percentage of persons with prior adverse reactions. The risk of an adverse reaction is 25 times higher if the person has had a prior adverse reaction. The risk can be reduced with prophylactic use of antihistamines and prompt emergency management of any ensuing anaphylaxis. A simple prick test may help to identify persons at greatest risk of adverse reaction.

== Chemistry ==
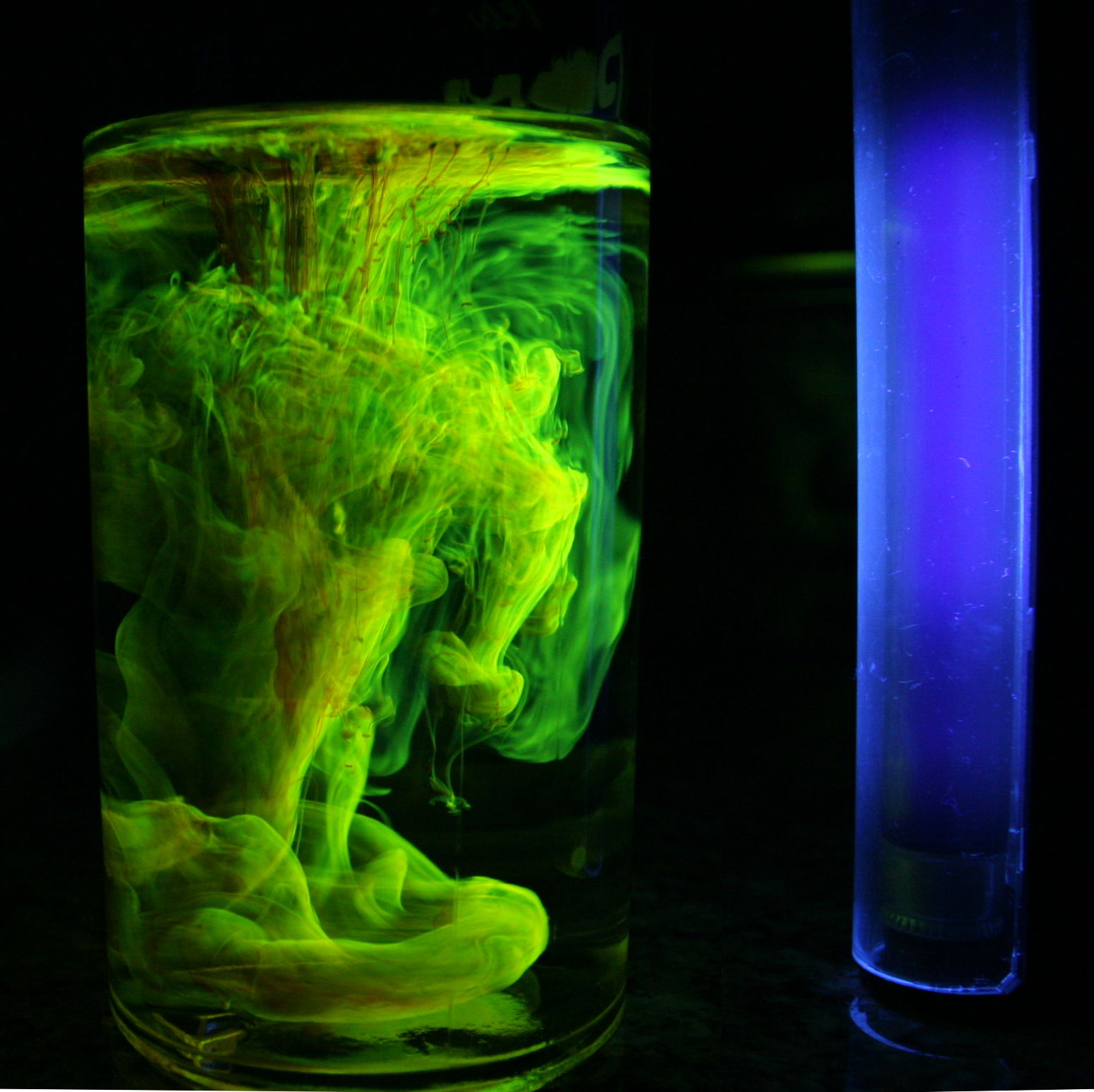
Fluorescein under UV illumination

Fluorescence excitation and emission spectra of fluorescein

The fluorescence of this molecule is very intense; for the deprotonated form in basic solution, peak excitation occurs at 495 nm and peak emission at 520 nm.

Fluorescein has a pK_{a} of 6.4, and its ionization equilibrium leads to pH-dependent absorption and emission over the range of 5 to 9. The fluorescence lifetimes of the protonated and deprotonated forms of fluorescein are approximately 3 and 4 ns, which allows for pH determination from non-intensity based measurements. The lifetimes can be recovered using time-correlated single photon counting or phase-modulation fluorimetry. Upon exhaustive irradiation with visible light, fluorescein decomposes to release phthalic and formic acids and carbon monoxide, effectively acting as a photoCORM. The remaining resorcinol rings react with singlet oxygen formed in situ to give oxidized, ring-opened products.

Fluorescein has an isosbestic point (equal absorption for all pH values) at 460 nm.

== Derivatives ==
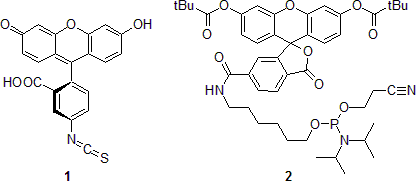
Fluorescein isothiocyanate and 6-FAM phosphoramidite

Many derivatives of fluorescein are known. These include fluorescein isothiocyanate 1 and succinimidyl ester modified fluorescein. Fluorescein isothiocyanate, often abbreviated as FITC, features an isothiocyanate group (−N=C=S) substituent. FITC reacts with the amine groups of many biologically relevant compounds, including intracellular proteins, to form a thiourea linkage. Succinimidyl ester modified fluorescein, also known as NHS-fluorescein, is a common amine-reactive derivative which yields amide adducts that are more stable than the aforementioned thioureas. Other useful reagents include carboxyfluorescein, carboxyfluorescein succinimidyl ester, pentafluorophenyl esters (PFP) and tetrafluorophenyl esters (TFP).

In oligonucleotide synthesis, several phosphoramidite reagents containing protected fluorescein, e.g. 6-FAM phosphoramidite 2, are used for the preparation of fluorescein-labeled oligonucleotides.

The extent to which fluorescein dilaurate is broken down to yield lauric acid can be detected as a measure of pancreatic esterase activity.

== Synthesis ==
Approximately 250 tons were produced in the year 2000. The method involves the fusion of phthalic anhydride and resorcinol, similar to the route described by Adolf von Baeyer in 1871. In some cases, acids such as zinc chloride and methanesulfonic acid are employed to accelerate the Friedel-Crafts reaction.

The mechanism of the reaction when undertaken with a strong acid such as sulfuric acid is proposed to begin with attack of protonated phthalic anhydride on the resorcinol.

== Research ==
Fluorescein is a fluorophore commonly used in microscopy, in a type of dye laser as the gain medium, in forensics and serology to detect latent blood stains, and in dye tracing. In water, fluorescein has an absorption maximum at 494 nm and emission maximum of 512 nm. Amongst its major uses in the sciences, it is used as a methylated spirit dye in Australia and New Zealand.

=== Biosciences ===
In cellular biology, the isothiocyanate derivative of fluorescein is often used to label and track cells in fluorescence microscopy applications, such as flow cytometry. Additional biologically active molecules, such as antibodies, may also be attached to fluorescein, allowing biologists to target the fluorophore to specific proteins or structures within cells. This application is common in yeast display.

Fluorescein can also be conjugated to nucleoside triphosphates and incorporated into a probe enzymatically for in situ hybridisation. The use of fluorescein amidite, shown below right, allows one to synthesize labeled oligonucleotides for the same purpose. Another technique, termed molecular beacons, makes use of synthetic fluorescein-labeled oligonucleotides. Fluorescein-labelled probes can be imaged using FISH, or targeted by antibodies using immunohistochemistry. The latter is a common alternative to digoxigenin, and the two are used together for labelling two genes in one sample.

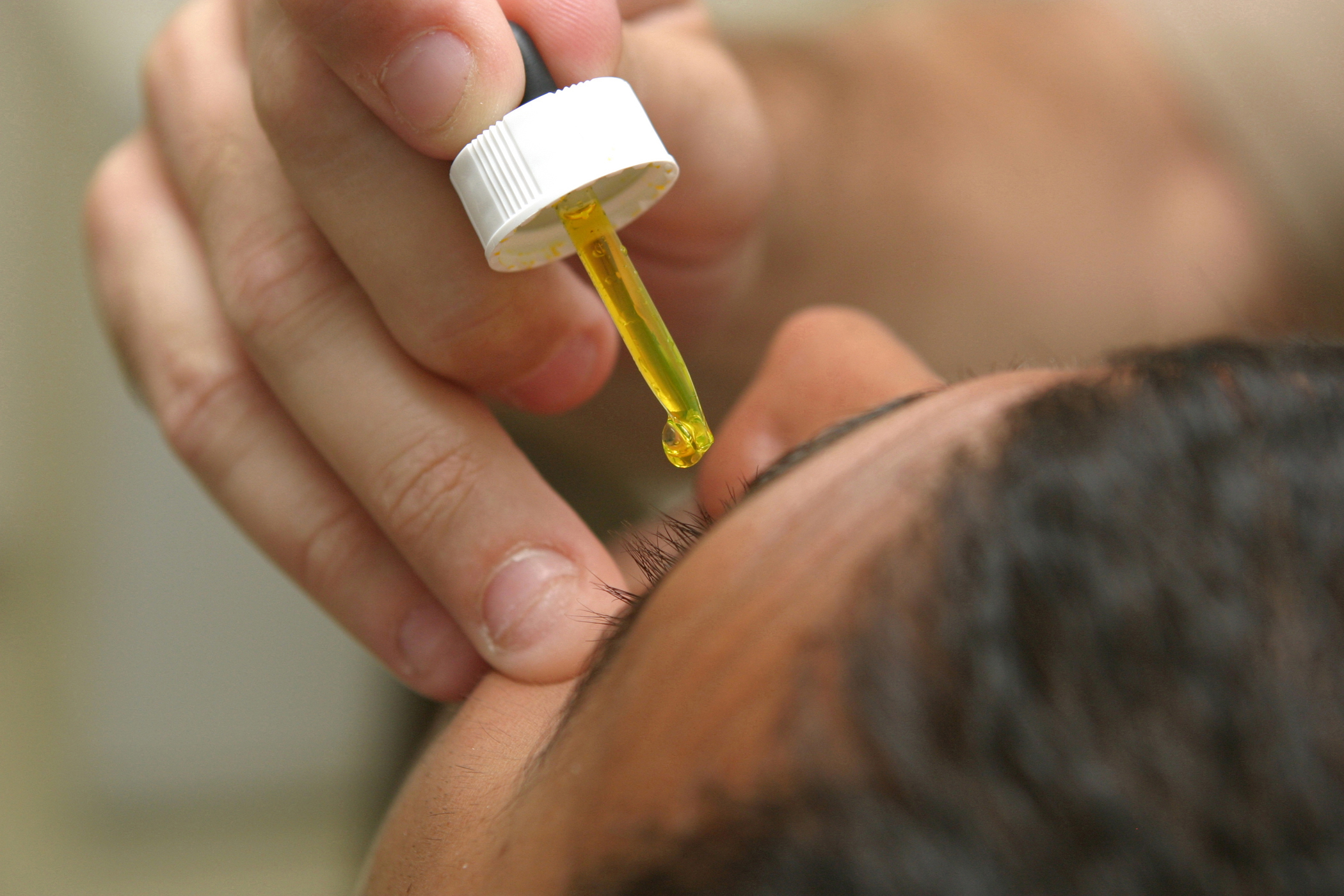
Fluorescein drops being instilled for an eye examination

Intravenous or oral fluorescein is used in fluorescein angiography in research and to diagnose and categorize vascular disorders including retinal disease, macular degeneration, diabetic retinopathy, inflammatory intraocular conditions, and intraocular tumors. It is also being used increasingly during surgery for brain and spine tumors.

Diluted fluorescein dye has been used to localise multiple muscular ventricular septal defects during open heart surgery and confirm the presence of any residual defects.

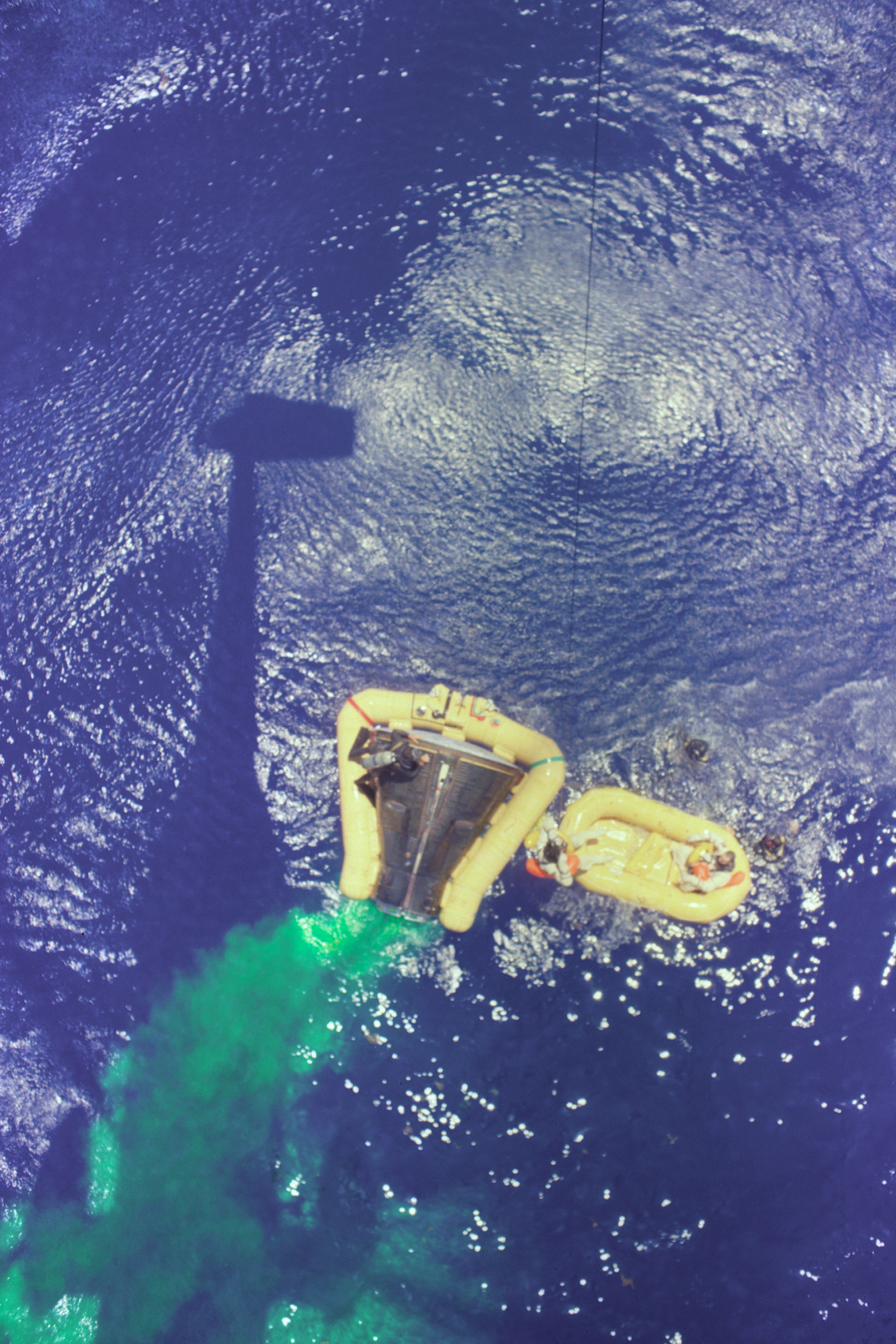
The Gemini 4 spacecraft releases dye into the water, to aid location after splashdown, June 1965.

=== Earth sciences ===
Fluorescein is used as a conservative flow tracer in hydrological tracer tests, to help in understanding of water flow of both surface waters and groundwater and observe areas of contamination or obstruction in these systems. The dye can also be added to rainwater in environmental testing simulations to aid in locating and analyzing any water leaks. As fluorescein solution changes its color depending on concentration, it has been used as a tracer in evaporation experiments.

Fluorescein dye solutions, typically 15% active, are commonly used as an aid in leak detection during hydrostatic testing of subsea oil and gas pipelines and other subsea infrastructures. Leaks can be detected by divers or ROVs carrying an ultraviolet light.

One of its more recognizable uses was in the Chicago River, where fluorescein was the first substance used to dye the river green on St. Patrick's Day in 1962. In 1966, environmentalists forced a change to a vegetable-based dye to protect local wildlife.

=== Plant science ===
In plant science, fluorescein and other fluorescent dyes have been used to monitor and study plant vasculature, particularly the xylem, which is the main water transportation pathway in plants. This is because fluorescein is xylem-mobile and unable to cross plasma membranes, making it particularly useful in tracking water movement through the xylem. Fluorescein can be introduced to a plant's veins through the roots or a cut stem. The dye is able to be taken up into the plant the same way as water and moves from the roots to the top of the plant due to a transpirational pull. The fluorescein that has been taken up into the plant can be visualized under a fluorescent microscope.

== See also ==
- Chemical derivatives of fluorescein:
  - Eosin, group of dibromo, or tetrabromo, derivatives of fluorescein.
  - Calcein, fluorescent dye and complexometric indicator.
  - Fluorescein amidite (FAM), synthetic equivalents of fluorescein used in oligonucleotide synthesis.
  - Merbromin, or mercurochrome, organomercuric antiseptic.
  - Erythrosine, tetraiodofluorescein.
  - Rose bengal, tetrachloro-tetraiodo-fluorescein used as stain in histology.
  - DyLight Fluor, a product line of fluorescent dyes.
- Fluorescein diacetate hydrolysis, a biochemistry laboratory test.
- Other dyes:
  - Rhodamine, family of derivatives of xanthene used as dyes, indicators and fluorescent tracers.
  - Methylene blue, blue thiazine dye also used as a medication.
  - Haematoxylin, natural stain derived from hearthwood and used in histology.
  - Laser dyes
- Precursor aromatic heterocyclic chromophore structures:
  - Phenothiazine, the chromophore structure in methylene blue.
  - Xanthene, aromatic heterocyclic structure present in fluorescein.
  - Xanthone
  - Xanthydrol
