= Pentafluorothiophenol =

Names
- Preferred IUPAC name Pentafluorobenzenethiol
- Other names: Pentafluorophenylthiol; 2,3,4,5,6-Pentafluorobenzenethiol; 2,3,4,5,6-Pentafluorothiophenol; Mercapto(pentafluoro)benzene

Identifiers
CAS Number	771-62-0
3D model (JSmol)	Interactive image
ChemSpider	12500
ECHA InfoCard	100.011.124
PubChem CID	13042
UNII	CM7UNQ95TJ
CompTox Dashboard (EPA)	DTXSID10227887
- InChI: InChI=1S/C6HF5S/c7-1-2(8)4(10)6(12)5(11)3(1)9/h12H Key: UVAMFBJPMUMURT-UHFFFAOYSA-N; InChI=1/C6HF5S/c7-1-2(8)4(10)6(12)5(11)3(1)9/h12H Key: UVAMFBJPMUMURT-UHFFFAOYAU
- SMILES: c1(c(c(c(c(c1F)F)S)F)F)F

Properties
Chemical formula	C_{6}F_{5}SH
Molar mass	200.13 g·mol^{−1}
Appearance	colorless liquid
Density	1.625±0.06 g/cm^{3}
Melting point	−24 °C (−11 °F; 249 K)
Boiling point	143 °C (289 °F; 416 K)
Solubility in water	organic solvents
Acidity (pK_{a})	2.68
- Except where otherwise noted, data are given for materials in their standard state (at 25 °C [77 °F], 100 kPa). Infobox references

Pentafluorothiophenol is an organosulfur compound with the formula C_{6}F_{5}SH. It is a colorless volatile liquid. The compound is prepared by the reaction of sodium hydrosulfide and hexafluorobenzene. With a pK_{a} of 2.68, it is one of the most acidic thiols. Its conjugate base has been used as a ligand in coordination chemistry.

== Related compounds ==
- Pentafluorophenol
