= Acyl-phosphate—hexose phosphotransferase =

Class of enzymes

acyl-phosphate-hexose phosphotransferase

Identifiers
- EC no.: 2.7.1.61
- CAS no.: 37278-06-1

Databases
- IntEnz: IntEnz view
- BRENDA: BRENDA entry
- ExPASy: NiceZyme view
- KEGG: KEGG entry
- MetaCyc: metabolic pathway
- PRIAM: profile
- PDB structures: RCSB PDB PDBe PDBsum
- Gene Ontology: AmiGO / QuickGO
Search
- PMC: articles
- PubMed: articles
- NCBI: proteins

In enzymology, an acyl-phosphate-hexose phosphotransferase (EC 2.7.1.61) is an enzyme that catalyzes the chemical reaction

acyl phosphate + D-hexose $\rightleftharpoons$ an acid + D-hexose phosphate

Thus, the two substrates of this enzyme are acyl phosphate and D-hexose, whereas its two products are acid and D-hexose phosphate.

This enzyme belongs to the family of transferases, specifically those transferring phosphorus-containing groups (phosphotransferases) with an alcohol group as acceptor. The systematic name of this enzyme class is acyl-phosphate:D-hexose phosphotransferase. This enzyme is also called hexose phosphate:hexose phosphotransferase.
