= CFSE =

CFSE may refer to:

- Carboxyfluorescein succinimidyl ester, a fluorescent cell staining dye
- Crystal field stabilization energy
- Certified Functional Safety Expert
