= Pentachlorobenzene =

Names
- Preferred IUPAC name Pentachlorobenzene
- Other names PeCB

Identifiers
CAS Number	608-93-5
3D model (JSmol)	Interactive image
Beilstein Reference	1911550
ChEBI	CHEBI:47136
ChEMBL	ChEMBL44628
ChemSpider	21106570
ECHA InfoCard	100.009.248
EC Number	602-074-00-5
Gmelin Reference	51144
KEGG	C18141
PubChem CID	11855
RTECS number	DA6640000
UNII	D62GWO6832
CompTox Dashboard (EPA)	DTXSID7024247
- InChI: InChI=1S/C6HCl5/c7-2-1-3(8)5(10)6(11)4(2)9/h1H Key: CEOCDNVZRAIOQZ-UHFFFAOYSA-N; InChI=1/C6HCl5/c7-2-1-3(8)5(10)6(11)4(2)9/h1H Key: CEOCDNVZRAIOQZ-UHFFFAOYAV
- SMILES: c1c(Cl)c(Cl)c(Cl)c(Cl)c1Cl

Properties
Chemical formula	C_{6}HCl_{5}
Molar mass	250.32 g·mol^{−1}
Appearance	White or colorless crystals
Density	1.8 g/cm^{3}
Melting point	86 °C (187 °F; 359 K)
Boiling point	275 to 277 °C (527 to 531 °F; 548 to 550 K)
Solubility in water	0.68 mg/L

Hazards
- GHS labelling
Pictograms	(GHS02: Flammable) (GHS07: Exclamation mark) (GHS09: Environmental hazard)
Signal word	Danger
Hazard statements	H228, H302, H410
Precautionary statements	P210, P240, P241, P264, P270, P273, P280, P301+P312, P330, P370+P378, P391, P501
- Lethal dose or concentration (LD, LC)
LD_{50} (median dose)	rat: 1080 mg/kg mouse: 1175 mg/kg
- Except where otherwise noted, data are given for materials in their standard state (at 25 °C [77 °F], 100 kPa). verify (what is ?) Infobox references

Pentachlorobenzene (PeCB) is an aryl chloride and a five-substituted chlorobenzene with the molecular formula C_{6}HCl_{5} which is a chlorinated aromatic hydrocarbon. It consists of a benzene ring substituted with five chlorine atoms. PeCB was once used industrially for a variety of uses, but because of environmental concerns there are currently no large scale uses of PeCB. Pentachlorobenzene is a known persistent organic pollutant (POP) and banned globally by the Stockholm Convention on Persistent Organic Pollutants in 2009.

== Production ==
PeCB can be produced as a byproduct of the manufacture of carbon tetrachloride and benzene. It is extracted by distillation and crystallization. The direct production of pure PeCB is not practical because of the simultaneous production of other chlorinated compounds. Since PeCB is generally produced in small quantities in the chlorination of benzene, it is also contained in other chlorobenzenes (dichlorobenzenes, trichlorobenzenes etc.)

Today, a majority of the PeCB released into the environment is a result of backyard trash burning and municipal waste incineration.

== Uses ==
PeCB was used as an intermediate in the manufacture of pesticides, particularly the fungicide pentachloronitrobenzene. Pentachloronitrobenzene is now made by the chlorination of nitrobenzene in order to avoid the use of PeCB.

PeCB was a component of a mixture of chlorobenzenes added to products containing polychlorinated biphenyls in order to reduce viscosity. PeCB has also been used as a fire retardant.

== Safety and regulation ==
PeCB is a persistent organic pollutant, allowing an accumulation in the food chain. Consequently, pentachlorobenzene was added in 2009 to the list of chemical compounds covered by the Stockholm Convention, an international treaty which restricts the production and use of persistent organic pollutants. PeCB has been banned in the European Union since 2002.

PeCB is very toxic to aquatic organisms, and decomposes on heating or on burning with the formation of toxic, corrosive fumes including hydrogen chloride. Combustion of PeCB may also result in the formation of polychlorinated dibenzodioxins ("dioxins") and polychlorinated dibenzofurans.

== See also ==
- Chlorobenzenes—different numbers of chlorine substituents
- Pentafluorobenzene
- Pentachlorobenzenethiol
- Pentachlorotoluene
