= Fluorescein amidite =

Synthetic equivalents of fluorescein dye used in oligonucleotide synthesis

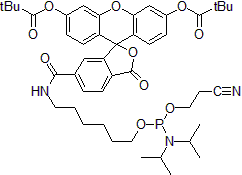
Non-nucleoside phosphoramidites for 5'-modification of synthetic oligonucleotides

Fluorescein amidites, abbreviated as FAM, are important synthetic equivalents of fluorescein dye used in oligonucleotide synthesis and molecular biology. FAM is used in the preparation of fluorescein-labeled oligonucleotide probes for the detection of the presence of the complementary nucleic acids or primers for polymerase chain reaction. Oligonucleotides labeled with fluorescein at one of the termini and with a quencher at the other can serve as molecular beacons.

The commercially available 6-FAM version is shown in the figure.
