= Pentafluoromethylbenzene =

Names
- Preferred IUPAC name 1,2,3,4,5-pentafluoro-6-methylbenzene
- Other names 2,3,4,5,6-Pentafluorotoluene, Pentafluorotoluene, PFT

Identifiers
CAS Number	771-56-2
3D model (JSmol)	Interactive image
ChemSpider	21168888
ECHA InfoCard	100.011.121
EC Number	212-233-7
PubChem CID	24846631
UNII	YZ42CXN177
CompTox Dashboard (EPA)	DTXSID0061119
- InChI: InChI=1S/C7H3F5/c1-2-3(8)5(10)7(12)6(11)4(2)9/h1H3 Key: SXPRVMIZFRCAGC-UHFFFAOYSA-N
- SMILES: FC=1C(F)=C(F)C(=C(F)C1F)C

Properties
Chemical formula	C_{7}H_{3}F_{5}
Molar mass	182.093 g·mol^{−1}
Appearance	Colorless liquid
Density	1.439 g/mL at 25 °C (lit.)
Melting point	−29.8 °C (−21.6 °F; 243.3 K)
Boiling point	90–120 °C (194–248 °F; 363–393 K)
Solubility in water	Poorly soluble

Hazards
- GHS labelling
Pictograms	(GHS02: Flammable) (GHS07: Exclamation mark)
Signal word	Warning
Hazard statements	H226, H302+H312+H332, H315, H319, H335
Flash point	34 °C (93 °F; 307 K)
- Except where otherwise noted, data are given for materials in their standard state (at 25 °C [77 °F], 100 kPa). Infobox references

Pentafluoromethylbenzene is a synthetic organofluoride compound with the molecular formula C_{6}F_{5}CH_{3}.

== Synthesis ==
The compound can be obtained by the Friedel–Crafts reaction of pentafluorobenzene with methyl chloride.

Also, the compound can be prepared by reacting hexafluorobenzene with methyllithium.

== Physical properties ==
Pentafluoromethylbenzene is a colorless, volatile liquid with a distinctive sweet smell. It is known for its high reactivity, low toxicity, and limited solubility. Additionally, it has the ability to form complexes with metals such as iron and copper.

== Chemical properties ==
The presence of electron-withdrawing fluorine atoms on its aromatic ring significantly enhances the compound reactivity.

Under the influence of light, pentafluoromethylbenzene reacts with bromine to form pentafluorobenzyl bromide.

== Uses ==
This halogenated aromatic hydrocarbon is widely utilized in organic synthesis and analytical chemistry due to its unique characteristics. In scientific studies, the compound is frequently employed to synthesize a variety of organic compounds, including amides, ketones, and carboxylic acids.

== See also ==
- Fluorobenzene
- Hexafluorobenzene
- Pentabromotoluene
- Pentachlorobenzene
- Pentachlorotoluene
