= Pentachloronitrobenzene =

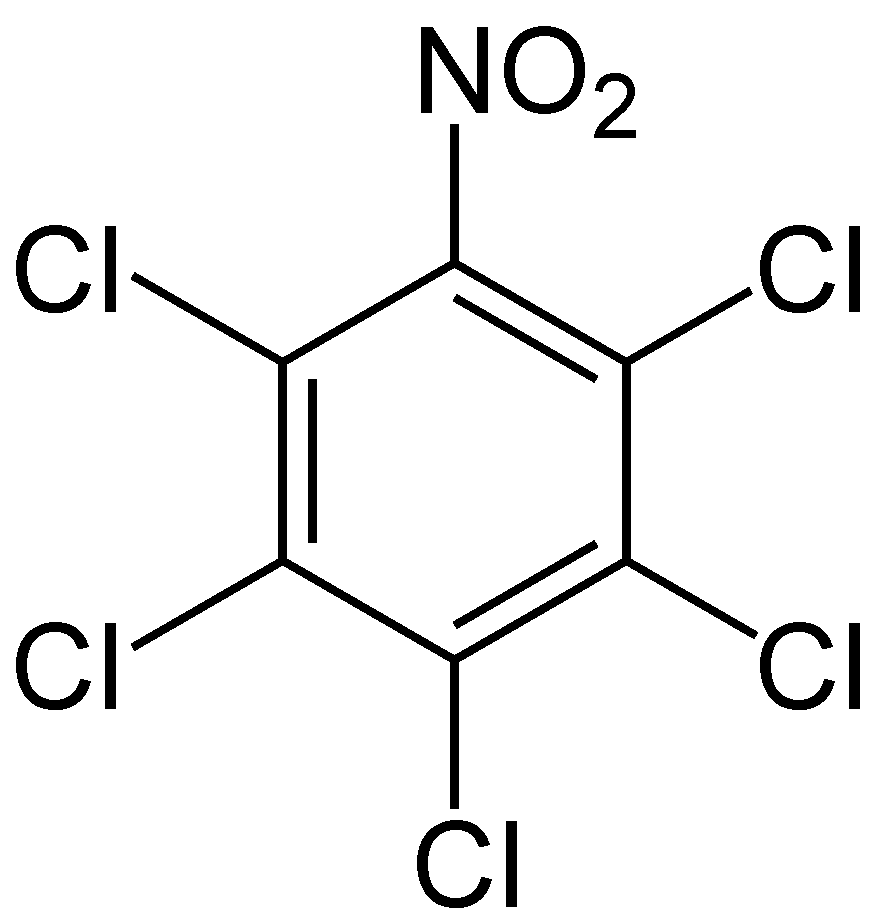

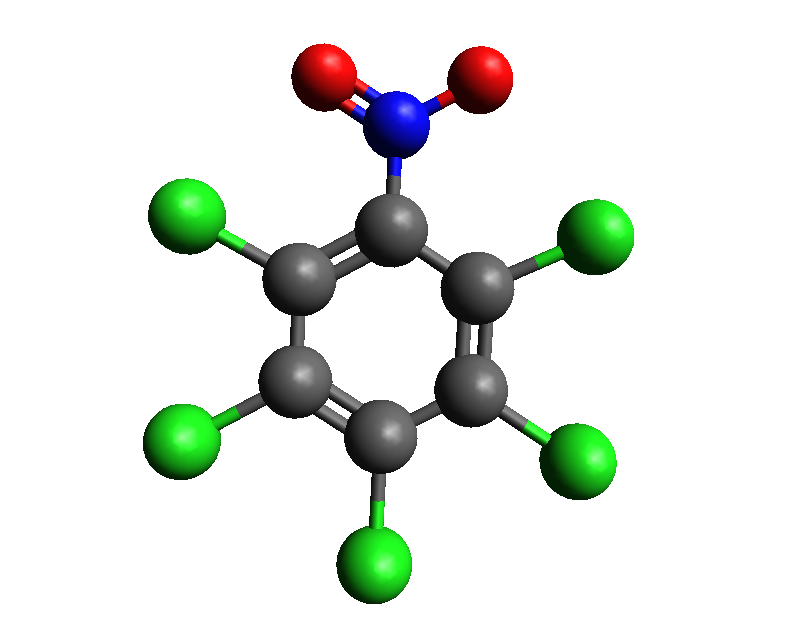

Names
- Preferred IUPAC name 1,2,3,4,5-Pentachloro-6-nitrobenzene
- Other names Pentachloronitrobenzene; PCNB; Quintozene

Identifiers
CAS Number	82-68-8
3D model (JSmol)	Interactive image
ChEBI	CHEBI:34908
ChEMBL	ChEMBL468759
ChemSpider	6464
ECHA InfoCard	100.001.305
PubChem CID	6720
UNII	Q37G40S4S8
CompTox Dashboard (EPA)	DTXSID2021105
- InChI: InChI=1S/C6Cl5NO2/c7-1-2(8)4(10)6(12(13)14)5(11)3(1)9 Key: LKPLKUMXSAEKID-UHFFFAOYSA-N; InChI=1/C6Cl5NO2/c7-1-2(8)4(10)6(12(13)14)5(11)3(1)9 Key: LKPLKUMXSAEKID-UHFFFAOYAW
- SMILES: O=[N+]([O-])c1c(Cl)c(Cl)c(Cl)c(Cl)c1Cl

Properties
Chemical formula	C_{6}Cl_{5}NO_{2}
Molar mass	295.32 g·mol^{−1}
Appearance	Off-white or yellow crystals
Melting point	144 °C (291 °F; 417 K)
Boiling point	328 °C (622 °F; 601 K) decomposes
Solubility in water	0.44 mg/L
Solubility	Slightly soluble in alcohols
- Except where otherwise noted, data are given for materials in their standard state (at 25 °C [77 °F], 100 kPa). verify (what is ?) Infobox references

Pentachloronitrobenzene, typically abbreviated PCNB, is a registered fungicide formally derived from nitrobenzene. It is an off-white to yellow crystalline solid with a musty odor.

== Preparation ==
PCNB was originally synthesized in the laboratory in 1868. It was introduced to the agricultural world in the 1930s in Germany by Bayer AG as a substitute to mercurial pesticides. PCNB is prepared by chlorination of nitrobenzene at 60–70 °C in chlorosulfuric acid, with iodine as a catalyst. It can also be produced by the nitration of chlorinated benzenes. A side product of the synthesis of PCNB is hexachlorobenzene (HCB), which is considered as hazardous as PCNB.

5 Cl_{2} + C_{6}H_{5}NO_{2} → C_{6}Cl_{5}NO_{2} + 5 HCl

== Main reactions ==
Reaction with ethanol and potassium hydroxide yields pentachlorophenetole, indicating its high reactivity:

C_{6}Cl_{5}NO_{2} + KOCH_{2}CH_{3} → C_{6}Cl_{5}OCH_{2}CH_{3} + KNO_{2}

Although PCNB has a long shelf life, it is labile in soil, with a half-life of 1.8 days. It degrades to other metabolites, mainly reducing to pentachloroaniline (PCA), but also to pentachlorophenol (PCP) through hydrolysis and pentachlorothioanisole (PCTA). Another metabolite is methyl pentachlorophenyl sulfide (MPCPS). Little information is available about the degradation mechanisms.

C_{6}Cl_{5}NO_{2} + 6 [H] → C_{6}Cl_{5}NH_{2} + 2 H_{2}O
C_{6}Cl_{5}NO_{2} + 6 H_{2}O → C_{6}Cl_{5}OH + HNO_{2}

== Applications ==
PCNB is used as a fungicide to suppress the growth of fungi in various crops, such as cotton, rice, and seed grains. It is also used to prevent the formation of slime in industrial waters. Residual amounts of the compound and its metabolites can be found in crops. The degradation products, PCA and PCTA have been found in farming soils and in river sediments.

== Regulation ==
In April 1993, PCNB was declared a hazardous air pollutant in the U.S. PCNB was reexamined for re-registration eligibility by the U.S. EPA in 2006 as part of the 1996 Food Protection Quality Act (FPQA) and as a result, use on a number of crops were ended or limited. In August 2010, in response to the discovery of a potentially toxic metabolite in technical grade PCNB to be used in fungicide formulations, the sale of PCNB was halted by the U.S. EPA until the issue could be resolved. In November 2011, the EPA approved certain registrations for PCNB, allowing it back on the market for golf course turf, potato, cotton, ornamental bulb and cole crop uses in the United States. PCNB is used widely as a fungicide in other countries, such as China and Japan, however, "it is no longer approved for use within the European Union".

== Bibliography ==
- Aschbacher PW, Feil VJ, Metabolism of pentachloronitrobenzene by goats and sheep; J Agric Food Chem. 1983 Nov-Dec; 31(6):1150-8.
