= Hexaiodobenzene =

Names
- Preferred IUPAC name Hexaiodobenzene
- Other names Periodobenzene

Identifiers
CAS Number	608-74-2
3D model (JSmol)	Interactive image
ChemSpider	11360
ECHA InfoCard	100.009.246
PubChem CID	11853
UNII	L3RDK4VNA8
CompTox Dashboard (EPA)	DTXSID5060562
- InChI: InChI=1S/C6I6/c7-1-2(8)4(10)6(12)5(11)3(1)9 Key: QNMKKFHJKJJOMZ-UHFFFAOYSA-N; InChI=1/C6I6/c7-1-2(8)4(10)6(12)5(11)3(1)9 Key: QNMKKFHJKJJOMZ-UHFFFAOYAO
- SMILES: C1(=C(C(=C(C(=C1I)I)I)I)I)I

Properties
Chemical formula	C_{6}I_{6}
Molar mass	833.493 g·mol^{−1}
Appearance	orange crystals
Density	4.60 g/cm^{3}
Melting point	430 °C (806 °F; 703 K)
Solubility in water	insoluble

Structure
Crystal structure	monoclinic
Space group	P2_{1}/c, No. 14
Lattice constant	a = 8.87 Å, b = 4.29 Å, c = 16.28 Å α = 90°, β = 93°, γ = 90°

Related compounds
Related compounds	Hexafluorobenzene; Hexachlorobenzene; Hexabromobenzene
- Except where otherwise noted, data are given for materials in their standard state (at 25 °C [77 °F], 100 kPa). Infobox references

Hexaiodobenzene is an aryl iodide and a six-substituted iodobenzene with the formula C_{6}I_{6}. Structurally, it is a derivative of benzene, in which all hydrogen atoms are replaced by iodine atoms. It forms orange crystals that are poorly soluble in all solvents. It adopts the expected structure with a central C_{6} ring.

== Preparation ==
The compound was first prepared by iodination of benzoic acid in the presence of hot fuming sulfuric acid. Another method of synthesis is the reaction between benzene with periodic acid and potassium iodide in sulfuric acid at 100 °C. This method instead produces 1,2,4,5-tetraiodobenzene if done at room temperature.

== Properties ==
=== Physical properties ===
Hexaiodobenzene forms orange needles that are practically insoluble in water, but sparingly soluble in N-methyl-2-pyrrolidone and dimethyl sulfoxide. It melts at 430 °C, but also already begins to show some decomposition at 370 °C, forming I_{2}.

=== Crystallographic properties ===
The crystals are monoclinic and pseudohexagonal, with centrosymmetric C_{6}I_{6} units. The carbon atoms lie in a plane with C–C distances about 141 pm, while the nearby iodine atoms show very small displacements (about 4 pm) above and below the ring. The shortest intermolecular distance, 376 pm, is notably short compared to twice the Van der Waals radius, which is 430 pm. The structure is retained at high pressures up to 9.7 GPa.
