= Pentafluorophenyl esters =

Class of chemical compounds

Generic structure of a pentafluorophenyl ester

Pentafluorophenyl (PFP) esters are chemical compounds with the generic formula RC(O)OC_{6}F_{5}. They are active esters derived from pentafluorophenol (HOC_{6}F_{5}).

PFP esters are useful for attaching fluorophores such as fluorescein or haptens to primary amines in biomolecules. They also are valuable in laboratory peptide synthesis. Pentafluorophenyl esters produce amide bonds as effectively as succinimidyl esters and various similar agents do, but PFP esters are particularly useful because they are less susceptible to spontaneous hydrolysis during conjugation reactions.

Scheme of pentafluorophenylester formation of 6-carboxyfluoroscein
