= Pentafluorobenzoic acid =

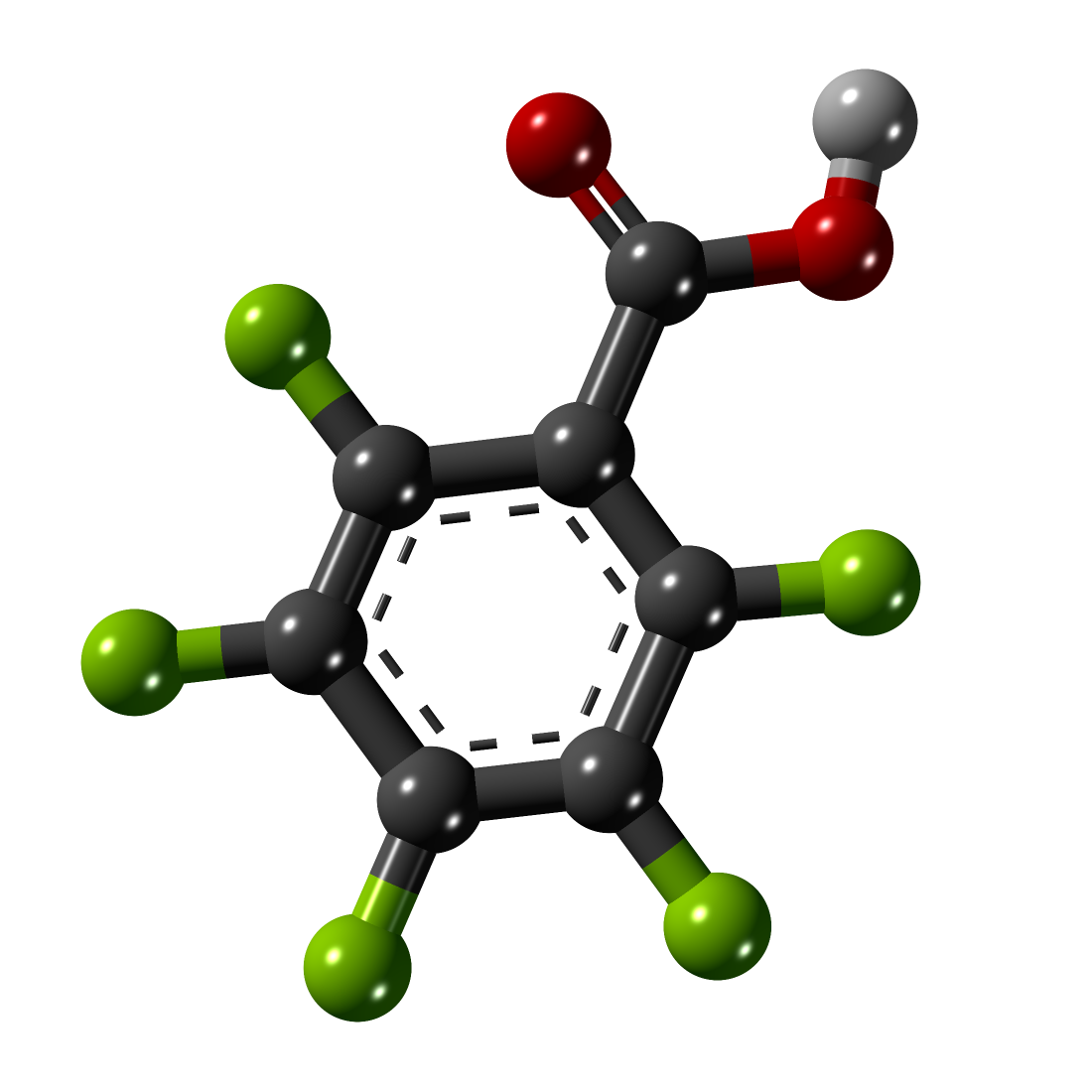

Names
- Preferred IUPAC name Pentafluorobenzoic acid
- Other names perfluorobenzoic acid

Identifiers
CAS Number	602-94-8
3D model (JSmol)	Interactive image
Beilstein Reference	2054395
ChemSpider	11277
ECHA InfoCard	100.009.115
Gmelin Reference	2054395
PubChem CID	11770
UNII	B4JCP8R5GJ
CompTox Dashboard (EPA)	DTXSID4060527
- InChI: InChI=1S/C7HF5O2/c8-2-1(7(13)14)3(9)5(11)6(12)4(2)10/h(H,13,14) Key: YZERDTREOUSUHF-UHFFFAOYSA-N; InChI=1/C7HF5O2/c8-2-1(7(13)14)3(9)5(11)6(12)4(2)10/h(H,13,14) Key: YZERDTREOUSUHF-UHFFFAOYAQ
- SMILES: Fc1c(c(F)c(F)c(F)c1F)C(=O)O

Properties
Chemical formula	C_{7}HF_{5}O_{2}
Molar mass	212.075 g·mol^{−1}
Appearance	White crystalline powder
Density	1.942 g/cm^{3}
Melting point	100–102 °C (212–216 °F; 373–375 K)
Boiling point	220 °C (428 °F; 493 K)
Solubility in water	Very soluble
log P	2.06
Acidity (pK_{a})	1.60

Hazards
NFPA 704 (fire diamond)	2 0 0
Flash point	87 °C (189 °F; 360 K)

Related compounds
Related carboxylic acids	benzoic acids, Nitrobenzoic acids
- Except where otherwise noted, data are given for materials in their standard state (at 25 °C [77 °F], 100 kPa). Infobox references

Pentafluorobenzoic acid (PFBA) is an organofluorine compound with the formula C_{6}F_{5}CO_{2}H. It is a white crystalline powder that has a high solubility in water. Its pK_{a} of 1.48 indicates that it is a strong acid.

== Preparation ==
Pentafluorobenzoic acid is prepared by treating pentafluorophenyllithium (or pentafluorophenyl Grignard reagent) with carbon dioxide. These reagents are usually prepared in situ from pentafluorobenzene and bromopentafluorobenzene.

It arises via the reaction of perfluorotoluene with trifluoroacetic acid and antimony pentafluoride.

== Substitution reactions ==
Substitution of fluoride occurs typically at the para position. This reaction has been used to anchor the −C_{6}F_{4}CO_{2}H group to surfaces. Magnesium methoxide results in ortho methoxylation. Cleavage of this ether gives tetrafluorosalicylic acid. Via similar ortho-directed reactivity, nickel complexes catalyse the defluoridation of 2 and 5 positions. Without nickel, defluoridation occurs with para-selectivity.
