= Pentachlorotoluene =

Names
- Preferred IUPAC name 1,2,3,4,5-pentachloro-6-methylbenzene
- Other names PCT

Identifiers
CAS Number	877-11-2
3D model (JSmol)	Interactive image
ChemSpider	12838
EC Number	690-095-0
PubChem CID	13412
CompTox Dashboard (EPA)	DTXSID10870791
- InChI: InChI=1S/C7H3Cl5/c1-2-3(8)5(10)7(12)6(11)4(2)9/h1H3 Key: AVSIMRGRHWKCAY-UHFFFAOYSA-N
- SMILES: ClC=1C(Cl)=C(Cl)C(=C(Cl)C1Cl)C

Properties
Chemical formula	C_{7}H_{3}Cl_{5}
Molar mass	264.35 g·mol^{−1}
Appearance	white solid
Density	1.67 g/cm³
Melting point	224.8 °C (436.6 °F; 497.9 K)
Boiling point	301 °C (574 °F; 574 K)
Solubility in water	soluble

Hazards
- GHS labelling
Pictograms	(GHS07: Exclamation mark)
- Except where otherwise noted, data are given for materials in their standard state (at 25 °C [77 °F], 100 kPa). Infobox references

Pentachlorotoluene is a synthetic organochlorine compound with the molecular formula C_{6}Cl_{5}CH_{3}. This is an organic chemical compound from the group of aromatics and a derivative of toluene.

== Synthesis ==
Pentachlorotoluene can be synthesized by chlorination of toluene.

== Physical properties ==
This compound forms a white solid with a distinctive smell. The chlorine atoms contribute to its density, making it heavier than water. Because of its low volatility and fat-loving nature, pentachlorotoluene tends to build up in organic tissues, raising concerns in environmental and health research.

== Uses ==
The compound is traditionally employed as an intermediate in the production of various chemicals, such as pesticides and pharmaceuticals. Nevertheless, because of its environmental persistence, tendency to bioaccumulate, and harmful effects on humans and wildlife, its usage has been significantly limited in numerous countries.

== See also ==
- Hexachlorobenzene
- Pentabromotoluene
- Pentachlorobenzene
- Pentafluorotoluene
