= Hexabromobenzene =

Names
- Preferred IUPAC name Hexabromobenzene
- Other names: Perbromobenzene; HBB

Identifiers
CAS Number	87-82-1
3D model (JSmol)	Interactive image
ChEMBL	ChEMBL375600
ChemSpider	6639
ECHA InfoCard	100.001.613
EC Number	201-773-9
PubChem CID	6905
UNII	T01859XWIR
UN number	3077
CompTox Dashboard (EPA)	DTXSID1024128
- InChI: InChI=1S/C6Br6/c7-1-2(8)4(10)6(12)5(11)3(1)9 Key: CAYGQBVSOZLICD-UHFFFAOYSA-N; InChI=1/C6Br6/c7-1-2(8)4(10)6(12)5(11)3(1)9 Key: CAYGQBVSOZLICD-UHFFFAOYAA
- SMILES: C1(=C(C(=C(C(=C1Br)Br)Br)Br)Br)Br

Properties
Chemical formula	C_{6}Br_{6}
Molar mass	551.490 g·mol^{−1}
Appearance	Monoclinic needles or white powder.
Odor	Odorless
Melting point	327 °C (621 °F; 600 K)
Solubility in water	0.16 × 10^{−3} mg/L (insoluble)
Solubility	Slightly soluble in Ethanol, Diethyl ether
Solubility in Acetic acid	Soluble
Solubility in Benzene	10%
Solubility in Chloroform	10%
Solubility in Petroleum ether	10%
log P	6.07

Hazards
- GHS labelling
Pictograms	(GHS07: Exclamation mark)
Signal word	Danger
Hazard statements	H302, H312, H315, H319, H332, H335, H413
Precautionary statements	P261, P264, P270, P271, P280, P301+P312, P302+P352, P304+P312, P304+P340, P305+P351+P338, P312, P321, P322, P330, P332+P313, P362, P363, P403+P233, P405, P501
NFPA 704 (fire diamond)	2 0 0
Safety data sheet (SDS)	LCSS 6905

Related compounds
Related compounds	Hexafluorobenzene; Hexachlorobenzene; Hexaiodobenzene
- Except where otherwise noted, data are given for materials in their standard state (at 25 °C [77 °F], 100 kPa). Infobox references

Hexabromobenzene (HBB) is an organobromine compound with the formula C_{6}Br_{6}. It features a central benzene ring with six bromine substituents. Hexabromobenzene is a white powder that is not soluble in water but is soluble in ethanol, ether, and benzene. Its bromine content by weight is above 86%.

== Preparation ==
It can be prepared by the reaction of 1,4-dibromobenzene with bromine in oleum, with a catalytic amount of iron and iodine.

== Uses ==
Hexabromobenzene has seen use in high voltage capacitors as a flame retardant.

Hexabromobenzene finds extensive use as a fire retardant additive in a range of materials including plastics, paper, and electrical goods, where it serves as a top-tier flame retardant. It was introduced to replace traditional organobromine fire retardants such as polybrominated derivatives of diphenyl ethers and biphenyls. With a high melting point of 327 °C and a high bromide content of 86.9 wt.%, HBB significantly enhances the fire safety of these materials. Its widespread application also leads to its dispersion in the environment.

== Metabolism ==
Hexabromobenzene was used in a study investigating its metabolic fate in female rats, wherein the substance was orally administered at doses of 16.6 mg/kg body weight every other day for a span of 2 weeks. Analysis of the rats' excreta revealed the presence of various metabolites, including unchanged HBB, pentabromobenzene, as well as oxygen- and sulfur-containing compounds.

== Dangers ==
Hexabromobenzene poses significant dangers due to its toxicity profile as classified by the GHS (Globally Harmonized System of Classification and Labeling of Chemicals). Classified as GHS07, HBB exhibits acute toxicity via oral, dermal, and inhalation routes, categorizing it under category 4 for this hazard. Additionally, it induces skin and eye irritation, classified under category 2 for both. Moreover, HBB is known to cause skin sensitization (category 1) and specific target organ toxicity upon single exposure (category 3), with the respiratory system being the primary target organ.

The acute toxicity of brominated benzenes decreases with an increase in the number of bromine atoms in the molecule. However, the potential for necrotic changes varies based on the position of these bromine atoms within the molecule. There are severe health risks associated with HBB exposure, warranting careful handling and stringent safety measures in its use and management.

== See also ==
- Pentabromotoluene
