= Pentabromotoluene =

Names
- Preferred IUPAC name 1,2,3,4,5-pentabromo-6-methylbenzene
- Other names Pentabromomethylbenzene, 2,3,4,5,6-Pentabromotoluene, PBT

Identifiers
CAS Number	87-83-2
3D model (JSmol)	Interactive image
ChemSpider	6640
ECHA InfoCard	100.001.614
EC Number	201-774-4
PubChem CID	6906
UNII	87007N97G5
CompTox Dashboard (EPA)	DTXSID3025833
- InChI: InChI=1S/C7H3Br5/c1-2-3(8)5(10)7(12)6(11)4(2)9/h1H3 Key: OZHJEQVYCBTHJT-UHFFFAOYSA-N
- SMILES: Cc1c(Br)c(Br)c(Br)c(Br)c1Br

Properties
Chemical formula	C_{7}H_{3}Br_{5}
Molar mass	486.621 g·mol^{−1}
Appearance	white crystals
Density	1.67 g/cm³
Melting point	290 °C (554 °F; 563 K)
Solubility in water	soluble

Hazards
- GHS labelling
Pictograms	(GHS07: Exclamation mark)
Signal word	Warning
Hazard statements	H315, H319, H335
- Except where otherwise noted, data are given for materials in their standard state (at 25 °C [77 °F], 100 kPa). Infobox references

Pentachlorotoluene is a synthetic organobromine compound with the molecular formula C_{6}Br_{5}CH_{3}.

== Synthesis ==
Pentabromotoluene is a derivative of toluene and is synthesized from it.

== Physical properties ==
The compound forms white crystalline powder. Its crystals are of monoclinic system. Due to the substitution with five bromine atoms on the aromatic ring, pentabromotoluene has a significantly lower volatility than toluene.

== Uses ==
Pentabromotoluene is widely used as a flame retardant in textiles, rubber, unsaturated polyesters, polyethylene, SBR latex, etc.

== See also ==
- Hexabromobenzene
- Pentafluorotoluene
- Pentachlorotoluene
