= Pentachlorobenzenethiol =

Names
- Preferred IUPAC name Pentachlorobenzenethiol
- Other names Pentachlorobenzenethiol, pentachlorothiophenol, PCBT

Identifiers
| CAS Number | 133-49-3 |
| 3D model (JSmol) | Interactive image |
| ChemSpider | 8301 |
| ECHA InfoCard | 100.004.644 |
| EC Number | 205-107-8 |
| PubChem CID | 8620 |
| UNII | 92A1Z48VJB |
| CompTox Dashboard (EPA) | DTXSID3044540 |
- InChI: InChI=1S/C6HCl5S/c7-1-2(8)4(10)6(12)5(11)3(1)9/h12H Key: LLMLGZUZTFMXSA-UHFFFAOYSA-N
- SMILES: C1(=C(C(=C(C(=C1Cl)Cl)Cl)Cl)Cl)S

Properties
| Chemical formula | C_{6}HCl_{5}S |
| Molar mass | 282.38 g·mol^{−1} |
| Appearance | Gray solid |
| Density | 1.7±0.1 g/cm^{3} |
| Melting point | 231.5 °C (448.7 °F; 504.6 K) |
| Solubility in water | Insoluble |

Hazards
- GHS labelling
| Pictograms | (GHS05: Corrosive) |
| Signal word | Warning |
| Flash point | 144.6 °C (292.3 °F; 417.8 K) |
- Except where otherwise noted, data are given for materials in their standard state (at 25 °C [77 °F], 100 kPa). Infobox references

Pentachlorobenzenethiol is a chemical compound from the group of thiols and organochlorine compounds. The chemical formula is C_{6}HCl_{5}S.

== Synthesis ==
Pentachlorobenzenethiol can be obtained from hexachlorobenzene.

== Properties ==
Pentachlorobenzenethiol is a combustible gray solid with an unpleasant odor, practically insoluble in water. It has a monoclinic crystal structure. The compound is not well-biodegradable and presumably bioaccumulable and toxic for aquatic organisms. Pentachlorobenzenethiol is itself a metabolite of hexachlorobenzene and is found in the urine and the excretions of animals receiving hexachlorobenzene. Pentachlorobenzenethiol has a high potential for long-range transport via air as it is very slowly degraded in atmosphere.

== Applications ==
Pentachlorobenzenethiol is used in the rubber industry. The compound is added to rubber (both natural and synthetic) to facilitate processing (mastication).
