= Pentafluorobenzene =

Names
- Preferred IUPAC name Pentafluorobenzene
- Other names Pentafluorobenzene, phenyl pentafluoride

Identifiers
CAS Number	363-72-4
3D model (JSmol)	Interactive image
ChemSpider	13866746
ECHA InfoCard	100.006.054
EC Number	206-658-7
PubChem CID	9696
UNII	IH36LU53XS
CompTox Dashboard (EPA)	DTXSID8059893
- InChI: InChI=1S/C6HF5/c7-2-1-3(8)5(10)6(11)4(2)9/h1H Key: WACNXHCZHTVBJM-UHFFFAOYSA-N
- SMILES: C1=C(C(=C(C(=C1F)F)F)F)F

Properties
Chemical formula	C_{6}HF_{5}
Molar mass	168.066 g·mol^{−1}
Appearance	Colorless liquid
Density	1.511 g/cm^{3}
Melting point	−47.4 °C (−53.3 °F; 225.8 K)
Boiling point	85 °C (185 °F; 358 K)
Solubility in water	Insoluble

Hazards
- GHS labelling
Pictograms	(GHS02: Flammable) (GHS05: Corrosive) (GHS07: Exclamation mark)
Signal word	Danger
Hazard statements	H225, H302, H315, H318, H335
Flash point	14 °C (57 °F; 287 K)
- Except where otherwise noted, data are given for materials in their standard state (at 25 °C [77 °F], 100 kPa). Infobox references

Pentafluorobenzene is a synthetic organofluoride compound with the molecular formula C_{6}HF_{5}. The compound consists of a benzene ring substituted with five fluorine atoms. The substance is a colorless liquid with a boiling point similar to that of benzene.

It is prepared by defluorination of highly fluorinated cyclohexanes over hot nickel or iron. Another method involved dehydrofluorination of polyfluorinated cyclohexane using hot aqueous solution of potassium hydroxide.

It has been observed as a degradation by-product of the incineration of polytetrafluoroethylene and of biosolids.

== Safety ==
According to its Safety Data Sheet (SDS), the chemical is highly flammable, and is harmful if swallowed. The SDS states its "toxicological properties have not been fully investigated". Combustion by-products include hydrogen fluoride.

== See also ==
- Hexafluorobenzene
- Pentachlorobenzene
- Pentafluoromethylbenzene
- Fluorobenzene
