= Antimony fluoride =

Antimony fluoride may refer to either of the following:

- Antimony trifluoride, SbF_{3}
- Antimony pentafluoride, SbF_{5}
