= Carboxyfluorescein succinimidyl ester =

6-Carboxyfluorescein succinimidyl ester
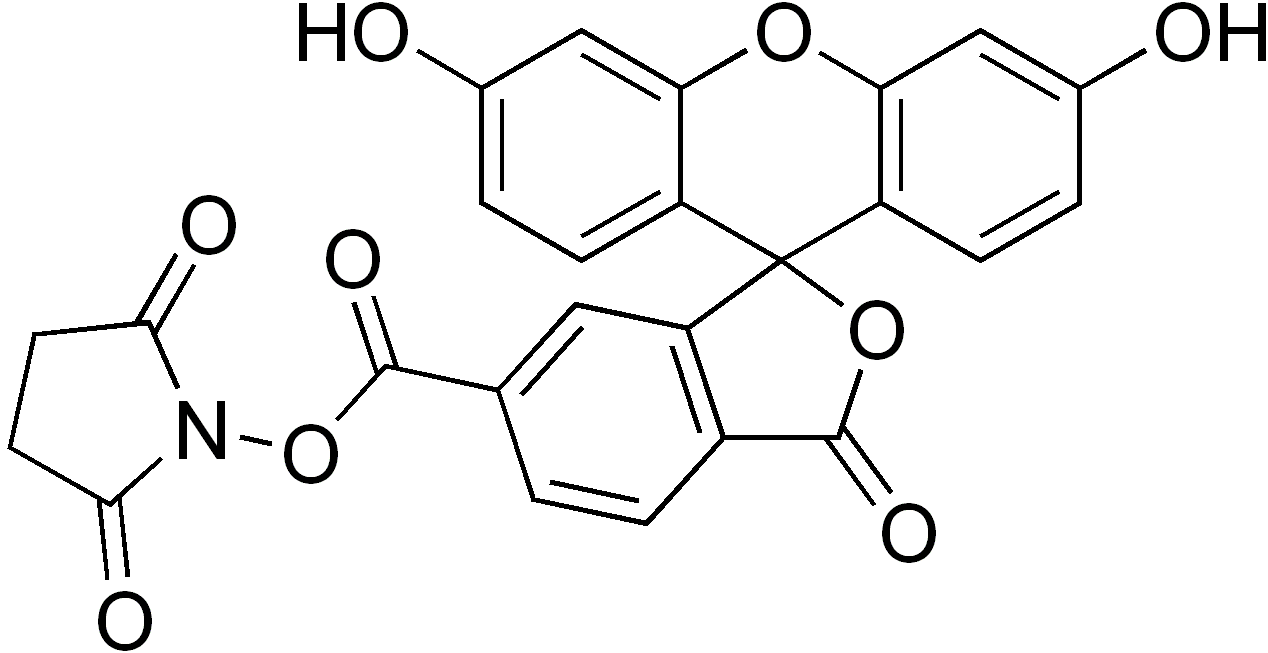

Names
- Preferred IUPAC name 2,5-Dioxopyrrolidin-1-yl 3,6-dihydroxy-3-oxo-3H-spiro[[2]benzofuran-1,9′-xanthene]-6-carboxylate
- Other names CFSE; Carboxyfluorescein N-succinimidyl ester

Identifiers
CAS Number	92557-81-8; 117548-22-8 (5/6 mixture)
3D model (JSmol)	Interactive image
ChemSpider	2043330
PubChem CID	2762614
UNII	6F2KC2X6RF
CompTox Dashboard (EPA)	DTXSID20376335
- InChI: InChI=1S/C25H15NO9/c27-13-2-5-16-19(10-13)33-20-11-14(28)3-6-17(20)25(16)18-9-12(1-4-15(18)24(32)34-25)23(31)35-26-21(29)7-8-22(26)30/h1-6,9-11,27-28H,7-8H2 Key: VDABVNMGKGUPEY-UHFFFAOYSA-N; InChI=1/C25H15NO9/c27-13-2-5-16-19(10-13)33-20-11-14(28)3-6-17(20)25(16)18-9-12(1-4-15(18)24(32)34-25)23(31)35-26-21(29)7-8-22(26)30/h1-6,9-11,27-28H,7-8H2 Key: VDABVNMGKGUPEY-UHFFFAOYAV
- SMILES: O=C(C5=C4C=C(C(ON6C(CCC6=O)=O)=O)C=C5)OC24C3=C(C=C(O)C=C3)OC1=CC(O)=CC=C12

Properties
Chemical formula	C_{25}H_{15}NO_{9}
Molar mass	473.393 g·mol^{−1}
- Except where otherwise noted, data are given for materials in their standard state (at 25 °C [77 °F], 100 kPa). verify (what is ?) Infobox references

Carboxyfluorescein succinimidyl ester (CFSE) is a fluorescent cell staining dye. CFSE is cell permeable and covalently couples, via its succinimidyl group, to intracellular molecules, notably, to intracellular lysine residues and other amine sources. Due to this covalent coupling reaction, fluorescent CFSE can be retained within cells for extremely long periods. Also, due to this stable linkage, once incorporated within cells, the dye is not transferred to adjacent cells.

CFSE is commonly confused with carboxyfluorescein diacetate succinimidyl ester (CFDA-SE), although they are not strictly the same molecule; CFDA-SE, due to its acetate groups, is highly cell permeable, while CFSE is much less so. As CFDA-SE, which is non-fluorescent, enters the cytoplasm of cells, intracellular esterases remove the acetate groups and convert the molecule to the fluorescent ester.

CFSE was originally developed as a fluorescent dye that could be used to stably label lymphocytes and track their migration within animals for many months. Subsequent studies revealed that the dye can be used to monitor lymphocyte proliferation, both in vitro and in vivo, due to the progressive halving of CFSE fluorescence within daughter cells following each cell division. The only limitation is that CFSE at high concentrations can be toxic for cells. However, when CFSE labelling is performed optimally, approximately 7-8 cell divisions can be identified before the CFSE fluorescence is too low to be distinguished above the autofluorescence background. Thus CFSE represents an extremely valuable fluorescent dye for immunological studies, allowing lymphocyte proliferation, migration and positioning to be simultaneously monitored. By the use of fluorescent antibodies against different lymphocyte cell surface markers it is also possible to follow the proliferation behaviour of different lymphocyte subsets. In addition, unlike other methods, CFSE-labeled viable cells can be recovered for further analysis.

Since the initial description of CFSE it has been used in thousands of immunological studies, an example of an early proliferation study in animals being described by Kurts et al. However, perhaps the most important CFSE investigations have been those demonstrating that many of the effector functions of lymphocytes, such as cytokine production by T lymphocytes, and antibody class switching by B cells, are division dependent. Sophisticated mathematical models have also been developed to analyse CFSE data and probe various aspects of immune responses. Furthermore, the use of CFSE has extended beyond the immune system, with the dye being used to monitor the proliferation of many other cell types such as smooth muscle cells, fibroblasts, hematopoietic stem cells and even bacteria. Another novel application of CFSE is its use for the in vitro and in vivo determination of cytotoxic lymphocytes.

Detailed protocols are now available that can be used to label lymphocytes (and other cell types) with a high degree of reliability and precision. One of the most important parameters, however, is to ensure that the cell population being studied has not been too heavily labelled with CFSE, as such cells, although remaining viable, proliferate sub-optimally.
