= N-Hydroxysuccinimide =

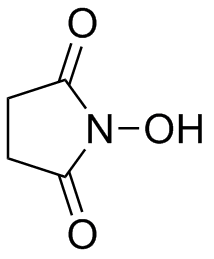

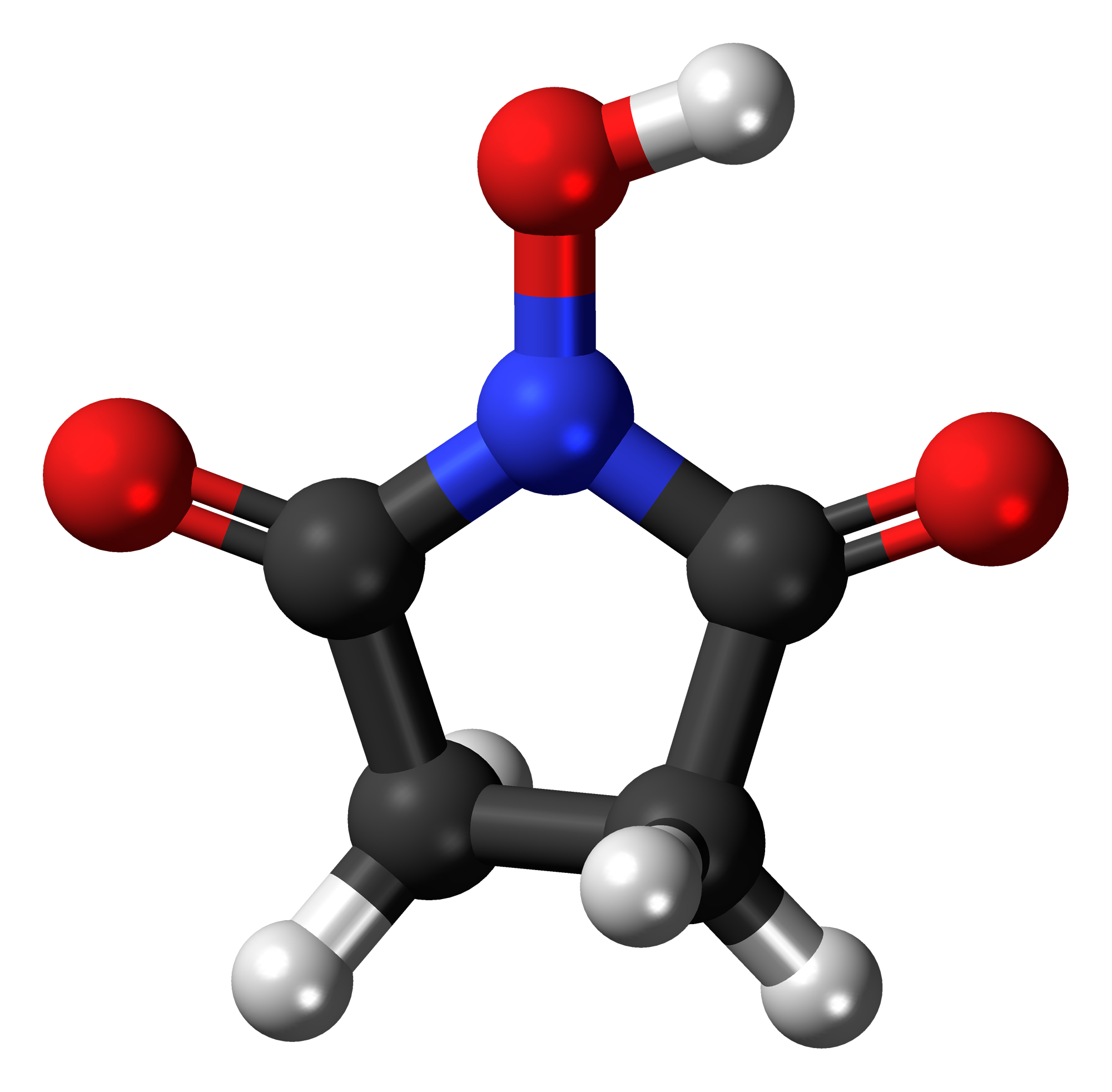

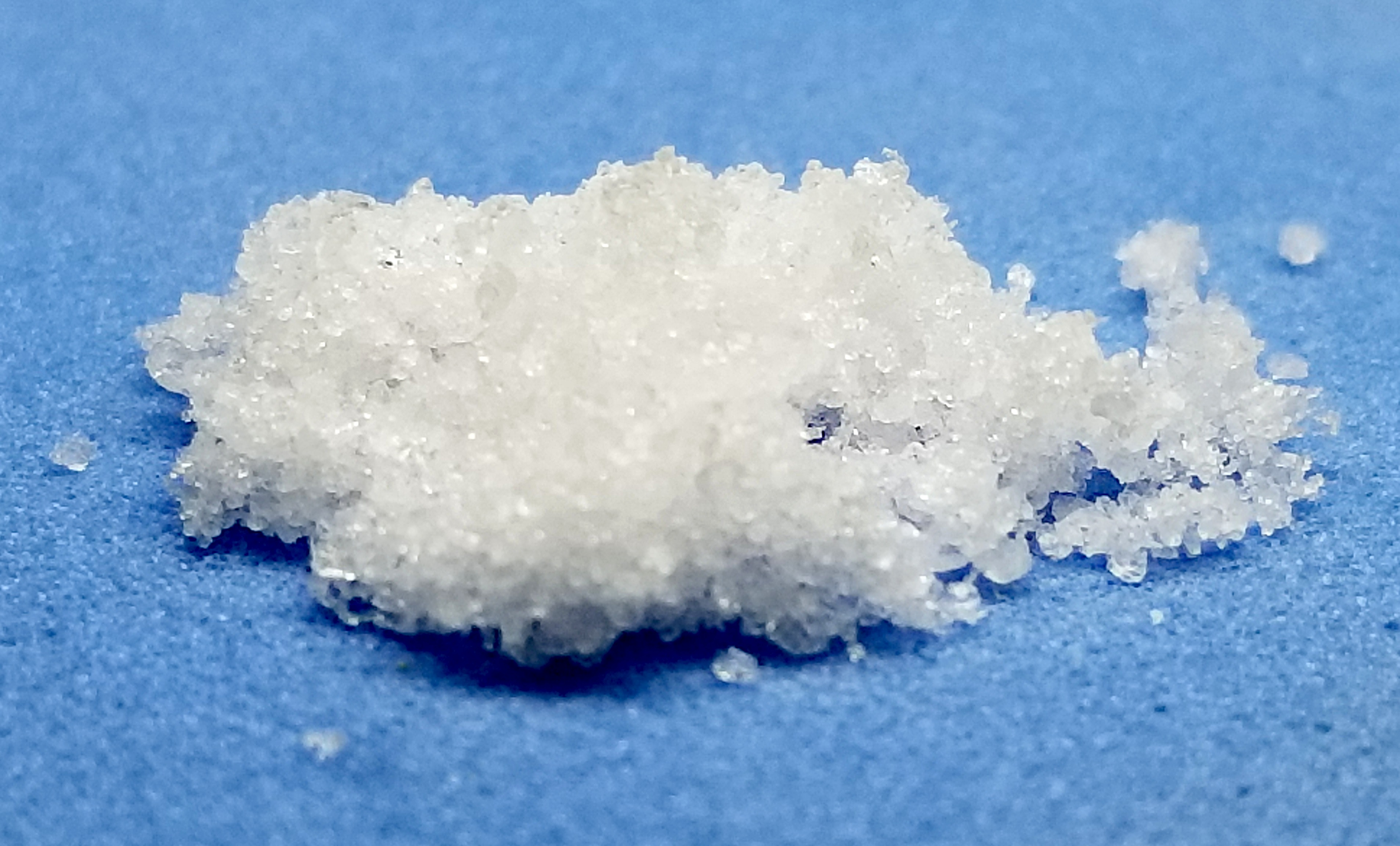

Names
- Preferred IUPAC name 1-Hydroxypyrrolidine-2,5-dione
- Other names HOSu, HSI.

Identifiers
CAS Number	6066-82-6
3D model (JSmol)	Interactive image
ChemSpider	72416
ECHA InfoCard	100.025.456
PubChem CID	80170
UNII	MJE3791M4T
CompTox Dashboard (EPA)	DTXSID7064102
- InChI: InChI=1S/C4H5NO3/c6-3-1-2-4(7)5(3)8/h8H,1-2H2 Key: NQTADLQHYWFPDB-UHFFFAOYSA-N; InChI=1/C4H5NO3/c6-3-1-2-4(7)5(3)8/h8H,1-2H2 Key: NQTADLQHYWFPDB-UHFFFAOYAM
- SMILES: O=C1N(O)C(=O)CC1

Properties
Chemical formula	C_{4}H_{5}NO_{3}
Molar mass	115.09 g/mol
Appearance	Colourless solid
Melting point	96.3 °C (205.3 °F; 369.4 K)

Related compounds
Related imides	Succinimide; N-Bromosuccinimide
- Except where otherwise noted, data are given for materials in their standard state (at 25 °C [77 °F], 100 kPa). verify (what is ?) Infobox references

N-Hydroxysuccinimide (NHS) is an organic compound with the formula (CH_{2}CO)_{2}NOH. It is a white solid that is used as a reagent for preparing active esters in peptide synthesis. It can be synthesized by heating succinic anhydride with hydroxylamine or hydroxylamine hydrochloride.

== Activating reagent ==
NHS is commonly found in organic chemistry or biochemistry where it is used as an activating reagent for carboxylic acids. Activated acids (carboxylates) can react with amines to form amides for example, whereas a normal carboxylic acid would just form a salt with an amine.

== Use ==
A common way to synthesize an NHS-activated acid is to mix NHS with the desired carboxylic acid and a small amount of an organic base in an anhydrous solvent. A coupling reagent such as dicyclohexylcarbodiimide (DCC) or 1-ethyl-3-(3-dimethylaminopropyl)carbodiimide (EDC) is then added to form a highly reactive activated acid intermediate. NHS reacts to create a less labile activated acid. The group is usually written as SuO- or -OSu in chemical notation. Such an ester with acid and NHS, sometimes called succinate ester, is stable enough to be purified and stored at low temperatures in the absence of water and, as such, is commercially available. NHS esters are commonly used for protein modification (e.g. an NHS ester of fluorescein is commercially available, and can be added to a protein to obtain a fluorescently labeled protein in a straightforward reaction and purification step).

NHS can be used with EDC to immobilize enzymes for biosensor applications.

== Alternatives ==
Some alternatives to NHS are the water-soluble analog sulfo-NHS, hydroxybenzotriazole (HOBt), 1-hydroxy-7-azabenzotriazole (HOAt), and pentafluorophenol.
