= Hexachlorobenzene =

Structural formula of hexachlorobenzene
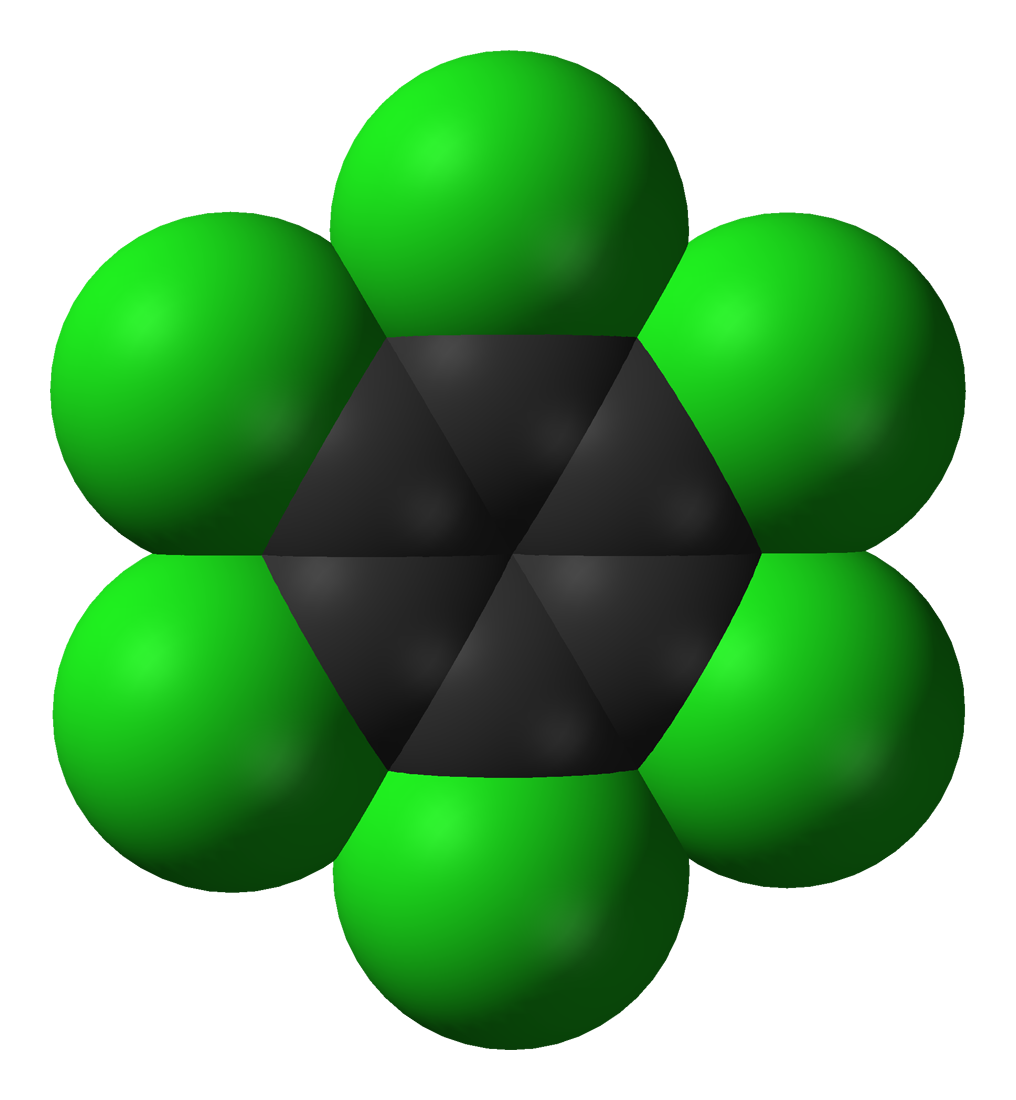
Ball-and-stick model of hexachlorobenzene

Names
- Preferred IUPAC name Hexachlorobenzene
- Other names Perchlorobenzene; HCB; Julin's chloride of carbon

Identifiers
CAS Number	118-74-1
3D model (JSmol)	Interactive image
ChEBI	CHEBI:5692
ChEMBL	ChEMBL228514
ChemSpider	8067
ECHA InfoCard	100.003.886
KEGG	C11042
PubChem CID	8370
UNII	4Z87H0LKUY
CompTox Dashboard (EPA)	DTXSID2020682
- InChI: InChI=1S/C6Cl6/c7-1-2(8)4(10)6(12)5(11)3(1)9 Key: CKAPSXZOOQJIBF-UHFFFAOYSA-N; InChI=1/C6Cl6/c7-1-2(8)4(10)6(12)5(11)3(1)9 Key: CKAPSXZOOQJIBF-UHFFFAOYAV
- SMILES: c1(Cl)c(Cl)c(Cl)c(Cl)c(Cl)c1Cl

Properties
Chemical formula	C_{6}Cl_{6}
Molar mass	284.77 g·mol^{−1}
Appearance	White crystalline solid
Density	2.04 g/cm^{3}
Melting point	228.83 °C (443.89 °F; 501.98 K)
Boiling point	325 °C (617 °F; 598 K)
Solubility in water	insoluble
Solubility in other solvents	slightly soluble in ethanol; soluble in diethyl ether and chloroform; very soluble in benzene
log P	5.47
Magnetic susceptibility (χ)	−147.0·10^{−6} cm^{3}/mol

Thermochemistry
Heat capacity (C)	201.2 J·mol^{−1}·K^{−1}
Std molar entropy (S^{⦵}_{298})	260.2 J·mol^{−1}·K^{−1}
Std enthalpy of formation (Δ_{f}H^{⦵}_{298})	−127.6 kJ·mol^{−1}
Enthalpy of fusion (Δ_{f}H^{⦵}_{fus})	25.2 kJ·mol^{−1}

Related compounds
Related compounds	Benzene; Hexafluorobenzene; Hexabromobenzene; Hexaiodobenzene
- Except where otherwise noted, data are given for materials in their standard state (at 25 °C [77 °F], 100 kPa). Infobox references

Hexachlorobenzene, or perchlorobenzene, is an aryl chloride and a six-substituted chlorobenzene with the molecular formula C_{6}Cl_{6}. It is a fungicide formerly used as a seed treatment, especially on wheat to control the fungal disease bunt. Its use has been banned globally under the Stockholm Convention on Persistent Organic Pollutants.

== Physical and chemical properties ==
Hexachlorobenzene is a stable, white, crystalline chlorinated hydrocarbon. It is sparingly soluble in organic solvents such as benzene, diethyl ether and alcohol, but practically insoluble in water with no reaction. It has a flash point of 468 °F and it is stable under normal temperatures and pressures. It is combustible but it does not ignite readily. When heated to decomposition, hexachlorobenzene emits highly toxic fumes of hydrochloric acid, other chlorinated compounds (such as phosgene), carbon monoxide, and carbon dioxide.

== History ==
Hexachlorobenzene was first known as "Julin's chloride of carbon" as it was discovered as a strange and unexpected product of impurities reacting in Johan Jacob von Julin's nitric acid factory. In 1864, Hugo Müller synthesised the compound by the reaction of benzene and antimony pentachloride, he then suggested that his compound was the same as Julin's chloride of carbon. Müller previously also believed it was the same compound as Michael Faraday's "perchloride of carbon" (Hexachloroethane), obtained a small sample of Julin's chloride of carbon to send to Richard Phillips and Faraday for investigation. In 1867, Henry Bassett proved that the compound produced from benzene and antimony was the same as Julin's carbon chloride and named it "hexachlorobenzene". Leopold Gmelin named it "dichloride of carbon" and claimed that the carbon was derived from cast iron and the chlorine was from crude saltpetre.

Victor Regnault obtained hexachlorobenzene from the decomposition of chloroform and tetrachloroethylene vapours through a red-hot tube.

The crystal structure of hexachlorobenzene was determined by Kathleen Lonsdale who showed the molecule to be planar and hexagonal.

== Synthesis ==
Large-scale manufacture for use as a fungicide was developed by using the residue remaining after purification of the mixture of isomers of hexachlorocyclohexane, from which the insecticide lindane (the γ-isomer) had been removed, leaving the unwanted α- and β- isomers. This mixture is produced when benzene is reacted with chlorine in the presence of ultraviolet light (e.g. from sunlight). However, manufacture is no longer practiced following the compound's ban.

Hexachlorobenzene has been made on a laboratory scale since the 1890s, by the electrophilic aromatic substitution reaction of chlorine with benzene or chlorobenzenes. A typical catalyst is ferric chloride. Much milder reagents than chlorine (e.g. dichlorine monoxide, iodine in chlorosulfonic acid) also suffice, and the various hexachlorocyclohexanes can substitute for benzene as well.

== Usage ==
Hexachlorobenzene was used in agriculture to control the fungus Tilletia caries (common bunt of wheat). It is also effective on Tilletia controversa, dwarf bunt. The compound was introduced in 1947, normally formulated as a seed dressing but is now banned in many countries.

A minor industrial phloroglucinol synthesis nucleophilically substitutes hexachlorobenzene with alkoxides, followed by acidic workup.

== Environmental considerations ==
HCB production peaked at around 100,000 tons per year in the late 1970's. Since then, usage has been declining steadily, with production of less than 90 tons per year by the mid 1990s. The half-life in soil is estimated to be 9 years. The mechanism of its toxicity and other adverse effects remain under study.

== Safety ==
Hexachlorobenzene can react violently with dimethylformamide, particularly in the presence of catalytic transition-metal salts.

== Toxicology ==
- Oral LD50 (rat): 10,000 mg/kg
- Oral LD50 (mice): 4,000 mg/kg
- Inhalation LC50 (rat): 3600 mg/m^{3}

Hexachlorobenzene has relatively low acute toxicity but is persistent and cumulative nature in body tissues in rich lipid content.

Hexachlorobenzene has been classified by the International Agency for Research on Cancer (IARC) as a Group 2B carcinogen (possibly carcinogenic to humans). Animal carcinogenicity data for hexachlorobenzene show increased incidences of liver, kidney (renal tubular tumours) and thyroid cancers. Chronic oral exposure in humans has been shown to give rise to a liver disease (porphyria cutanea tarda), skin lesions with discoloration, ulceration, photosensitivity, thyroid effects, bone effects and loss of hair. Neurological changes have been reported in rodents exposed to hexachlorobenzene. Hexachlorobenzene may cause embryolethality and teratogenic effects. Human and animal studies have demonstrated that hexachlorobenzene crosses the placenta to accumulate in foetal tissues and is transferred in breast milk.

HCB is very toxic to aquatic organisms. It may cause long term adverse effects in the aquatic environment. Therefore, release into waterways should be avoided. It is persistent in the environment. Ecological investigations have found that biomagnification up the food chain does occur. Hexachlorobenzene has a half-life in the soil of between 3 and 6 years. Risk of bioaccumulation in an aquatic species is high.

=== Anatolian porphyria ===
In Anatolia, Turkey between 1955 and 1959, during a period when bread wheat was unavailable, 500 people were fatally poisoned and more than 4,000 people fell ill by eating bread made with HCB-treated seed that was intended for agriculture use. Most of the sick were affected with a liver condition called porphyria cutanea tarda, which disturbs the metabolism of hemoglobin and results in skin lesions. Almost all breastfeeding children under the age of two, whose mothers had eaten tainted bread, died from a condition called "pink sore" (Turkish: pembe yara), most likely from high doses of HCB in the breast milk. In one mother's breast milk the HCB level was found to be 20 parts per million in lipid, approximately 2,000 times the average levels of contamination found in breast-milk samples around the world. Follow-up studies 20 to 30 years after the poisoning found average HCB levels in breast milk were still more than seven times the average for unexposed women in that part of the world (56 specimens of human milk obtained from mothers with porphyria, average value was 0.51 ppm in HCB-exposed patients compared to 0.07 ppm in unexposed controls), and 150 times the level allowed in cow's milk.

In the same follow-up study of 252 patients (162 males and 90 females, avg. current age of 35.7 years), 20–30 years' postexposure, many subjects had dermatologic, neurologic, and orthopedic symptoms and signs. The observed clinical findings include scarring of the face and hands (83.7%), hyperpigmentation (65%), hypertrichosis (44.8%), pinched faces (40.1%), painless arthritis (70.2%), small hands (66.6%), sensory shading (60.6%), myotonia (37.9%), cogwheeling (41.9%), enlarged thyroid (34.9%), and enlarged liver (4.8%). Urine and stool porphyrin levels were determined in all patients, and 17 have at least one of the porphyrins elevated. Offspring of mothers with three decades of HCB-induced porphyria appear normal.

== See also ==
- Chlorobenzenes—different numbers of chlorine substituents
- Hexachloroborazine
- Pentachlorobenzenethiol
- Pentachlorotoluene
