= Pentafluorophenol =

Names
- Preferred IUPAC name Pentafluorophenol

Identifiers
CAS Number	771-61-9
3D model (JSmol)	Interactive image
ChemSpider	12499
ECHA InfoCard	100.011.123
EC Number	212-235-8
PubChem CID	13041
UNII	A2YCF0YUHA
CompTox Dashboard (EPA)	DTXSID9061120
- InChI: InChI=1S/C6HF5O/c7-1-2(8)4(10)6(12)5(11)3(1)9/h12H Key: XBNGYFFABRKICK-UHFFFAOYSA-N
- SMILES: C1(=C(C(=C(C(=C1F)F)F)F)F)O

Properties
Chemical formula	C_{6}F_{5}OH
Molar mass	184.065 g·mol^{−1}
Appearance	white solid or colorless liquid
Melting point	32.8 °C (91.0 °F; 305.9 K)
Boiling point	145.6 °C (294.1 °F; 418.8 K)

Hazards
- GHS labelling
Pictograms	(GHS05: Corrosive) (GHS07: Exclamation mark)
Signal word	Danger
Hazard statements	H302, H312, H314, H315, H319, H335
Precautionary statements	P260, P264, P270, P271, P280, P301+P312, P301+P330+P331, P302+P352, P303+P361+P353, P304+P340, P305+P351+P338, P310, P312, P321, P322, P330, P332+P313, P337+P313, P362, P363, P403+P233, P405, P501
- Except where otherwise noted, data are given for materials in their standard state (at 25 °C [77 °F], 100 kPa). Infobox references

Pentafluorophenol is the organofluorine compound (specifically a fluorophenol) with the formula C_{6}F_{5}OH. This is the perfluorinated analogue of phenol. It is a white solid that melts just above room temperature, and smells of phenol. With a pK_{a} of 5.5, it is one of the most acidic phenols and can be easily deprotonated to pentafluorophenolate.

== Uses ==
Pentafluorophenol is used to prepare pentafluorophenyl esters, which are active esters useful in peptide synthesis.

== Environmental hazards ==
Pentafluorophenol is considered hazardous because of oral, dermal and inhalation toxicity and because it causes severe skin burns and eye damage.
