= Active ester =

In organic chemistry, an active ester is an ester functional group that is highly susceptible toward nucleophilic attack. Activation can be imparted by modifications of the acyl or the alkoxy components of a normal ester, say ethyl acetate. Typical modifications call for electronegative substituents. Active esters are employed in both synthetic and biological chemistry.

Acetyl CoA is the prototypical active ester in biosynthesis.

== Reactivity ==
Active esters are mainly used as acylating agents. They undergo the same reactions as their unactivated analogues but do so more rapidly. They are prone to hydrolysis, for example. Of great interest is the enhanced reactivity of active esters toward amines to give amides.

== Examples ==
=== Biochemistry ===
3'-Phosphoadenosine-5'-phosphosulfate is an active ester of sulfate.

Active esters are prominent in biochemistry. Glutamine synthetase is an enzyme that forms an active ester from the terminal carboxylate of glutamic acid. This activation, imparted by phosphorylation, facilitates the conversion of the carboxylate to an amide called glutamine.

Glutamine synthetase catalyzed reaction

Thioesters are prominent active esters, as illustrated by the esters of coenzyme A.

Terpenes and terpenoids are generated from active esters. Some biosynthetically significant active esters include isopentenyl pyrophosphate, dimethylallyl pyrophosphate, and geranyl pyrophosphate.

Simplified version of the steroid synthesis pathway with the active ester intermediates isopentenyl pyrophosphate (IPP), dimethylallyl pyrophosphate (DMAPP), geranyl pyrophosphate (GPP) and squalene shown. Some intermediates are omitted.

=== Synthetic chemistry ===
Use of hydroxybenzotriazole to form an active ester.

Hydroxybenzotriazole is used in peptide synthesis by forming an active ester from acyl isoureas.

Classically, activated esters are derivatives of nitrophenols and pentafluorophenol. These esters react with nucleophiles much more rapidly than the related aryl and especially alkyl esters.

Active esters of acrylic acid are precursors to polymers with reactive side chains.

The concept of active esters extends to esters of phosphoric and sulfuric acids. One such case is dimethylsulfate, a strong methylating agent.
