= Chlorine-releasing compounds =

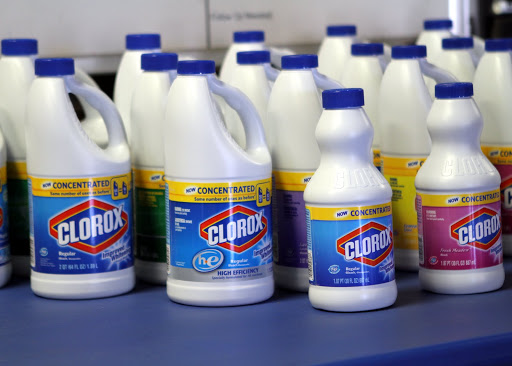
- One brand of chlorine based bleach

Clinical data
- Other names: Chlorine-releasing disinfectants, chlorine base compounds, chlorine-releasing bleach, chlorine based bleach
- Drug class: Disinfectant
- ATC code: D08AX (WHO)

Chlorine-releasing compounds, also known as chlorine base compounds, is jargon to describe certain chlorine-containing substances that are used as disinfectants and bleaches. They include the following chemicals: sodium hypochlorite (active agent in bleach), chloramine, halazone, and sodium dichloroisocyanurate. They are widely used to disinfect water and medical equipment, and surface areas as well as bleaching materials such as cloth. The presence of organic matter can make them less effective as disinfectants. They come as a liquid solution, or as a powder that is mixed with water before use.

Chlorine-releasing compounds can cause skin irritation and chemical burns to the eyes. They may also cause corrosion and therefore may require being rinsed off. Specific compounds in this family include sodium hypochlorite, monochloramine, halazone, chlorine dioxide, and sodium dichloroisocyanurate. They are effective against a wide variety of microorganisms including bacterial spores.

Chlorine-releasing compounds first came into use as bleaching agents around 1785, and as disinfectants in 1915. They are on the World Health Organization's List of Essential Medicines. They are used extensively in both the medical and the food industry.

== Uses ==
Chlorine-based compounds are usually handled in water solutions, powders, or tablets, that are mixed with water before use. They may have to be rinsed off after application to avoid corrosion of metals and degradation of organic materials.

=== Disinfectants ===
Chlorine-based compounds are effective against a wide variety of microorganisms including bacterial spores. They are listed by the World Health Organization as essential medicines in any health system.

The presence of other organic matter in the place of application can make these disinfectants less effective, by consuming some of the released chlorine.

=== Whitening agents ===
Chlorine-based bleaches have been used since the late 18th century to whiten cotton and linen clothes, removing either the natural fiber color or stains of sweat or other organic residues. They are still used in households for laundry and to remove organic stains (such as mildew) on surfaces.

Colors of natural materials typically arise from organic pigments, such as beta carotene. Chlorine-based compounds work by breaking the chemical bonds that make up the pigment's chromophore. This changes the molecule into a different substance that either does not contain a chromophore, or contains a chromophore that does not absorb visible light.

Industrially, chlorine-based bleaches are used in a wide variety of processes, including bleaching of wood pulp.

== Safety ==
Chlorine-releasing products present significant risks. It is estimated that, in 2002, there were about 3300 accidents needing hospital treatment caused by liquid bleach in British homes, and about 160 due to bleaching powder.

=== Chemical burns ===
Chlorine-releasing solutions, such as liquid bleach and solutions of bleaching powder, can burn the skin and cause eye damage, especially when used in concentrated forms. As recognized by the NFPA, however, only solutions containing more than 40% sodium hypochlorite by weight are considered hazardous oxidizers. Solutions less than 40% are classified as a moderate oxidizing hazard (NFPA 430, 2000).

=== Release of chlorine gas ===
Mixing a hypochlorite bleach with an acid can liberate chlorine gas.

Chlorine is a respiratory irritant that attacks mucous membranes and burns the skin. As little as 3.53 ppm can be detected as an odor, and 1000 ppm is likely to be fatal after a few deep breaths. Exposure to chlorine has been limited to 0.5 ppm (8-hour time-weighted average—38-hour week) by the U.S. OSHA. Due to transport and handling safety concerns, the use of sodium hypochlorite is preferred over chlorine gas in water treatment.

=== Reaction with other products ===
Chlorine releasing compounds can react with other common household chemicals like vinegar or ammonia to produce toxic gases.

Mixing an acid cleaner with a hypochlorite bleach can cause toxic chlorine gas to be released. The hypochlorite anion and chlorine are in equilibrium in water; the position of the equilibrium is pH dependent and low pH (acidic) favors chlorine,

Cl_{2} + H_{2}O ⇌ 2H^{+} + Cl^{−} + ClO^{−}

A hypochlorite bleach can react violently with hydrogen peroxide and produce oxygen gas:

H_{2}O_{2}(aq) + NaOCl (aq) → NaCl (aq) + H_{2}O(l) + O_{2}(g)

A 2008 study indicated that sodium hypochlorite and organic chemicals (e.g., surfactants, fragrances) contained in several household cleaning products can react to generate chlorinated volatile organic compounds (VOCs). These chlorinated compounds are emitted during cleaning applications, some of which are toxic and probable human carcinogens. The study showed that indoor air concentrations significantly increase (8–52 times for chloroform and 1–1170 times for carbon tetrachloride, respectively, above baseline quantities in the household) during the use of bleach-containing products. The increase in chlorinated volatile organic compound concentrations was the lowest for plain bleach and the highest for the products in the form of "thick liquid and gel." The significant increases observed in indoor air concentrations of several chlorinated VOCs (especially carbon tetrachloride and chloroform) indicate that the bleach use may be a source that could be important in terms of inhalation exposure to these compounds. The authors suggested that using these cleaning products may significantly increase the cancer risk.

The hypochlorites in liquid bleach and bleaching powder can react with ammonia to form a number of products, including monochloramine (NH_{2}Cl), then dichloramine (NHCl_{2}) and finally nitrogen trichloride (NCl_{3}). Similar reactions may occur with amines or related compounds and biological materials (such as urine). The result depends on the temperature, concentration, and how they are mixed. These compounds are very irritating to the eyes and lungs and are toxic above certain concentrations. Chronic exposure, for example, from the air at swimming pools where chlorine is used as the disinfectant, can lead to the development of atopic asthma. Nitrogen trichloride is also a very sensitive explosive.

=== Corrosion ===
Chlorine releasing products may also cause corrosion of many materials and unintended bleaching of colored products.

=== Neutralization ===
Sodium thiosulfate is an effective chlorine neutralizer. Rinsing with a 5 mg/L solution, followed by washing with soap and water, will remove chlorine odor from the hands.

== Main compounds ==
Specific compounds in this family include:

- Sodium hypochlorite, NaOCl. This chlorine-releasing compound is the most common bleaching and disinfection compound. A dilute (3–6%) aqueous solution in water, historically known as Eau de Labarraque or "Labarraque's water", is widely marketed as a household cleaning product, under the name "liquid bleach" or simply "bleach". More concentrated solutions are used to disinfect drinking water and as bleaching agents in industrial processes. A more diluted solution (up to 0.5%) has been in use since 1915 to cleanse and disinfect wounds, under the name of Dakin's solution.
- Calcium hypochlorite, Ca(OCl)_{2}. This product, known as "bleaching powder" or "chlorinated lime", it is used in many of the same applications as sodium hypochlorite, but is more stable and contains more available chlorine. It is usually marketed as a white powder that contains, besides the hypochlorite, also calcium hydroxide Ca(OH)_{2} ("lime") and calcium chloride CaCl_{2}. A purer, more stable form of calcium hypochlorite is called HTH or high test hypochlorite. It is also available as bleaching tablets that contain calcium hypochlorite and other ingredients to prevent the tablets from crumbling. A supposedly more stable mixture of calcium hypochlorite and quicklime (calcium oxide) is known as "tropical bleach". Percent active chlorine in these materials ranges from 20% for bleaching powder to 70% for HTH.
- Potassium hypochlorite, KOCl. This was the first chlorine-based bleaching agent, which became available around 1785 under the name Eau de Javel or "Javel water". It is no longer commonly used, having been superseded by the cheaper sodium analog.
- Chloramine, NH_{2}Cl. This chemical is commonly handled as a dilute aqueous solution. It is used as an alternative to chlorine and sodium hypochlorite for disinfection of drinking water and swimming pools.
- Chloramine-T, or tosylchloramide sodium salt, [(H_{3}C)(C_{6}H_{4})(SO_{2})(NHCl)]^{−}Na^{+}. This solid compound is available in tablet or powder form, and used in medical establishments to disinfect surfaces, equipment, and instruments.
- Sodium dichloroisocyanurate [((ClN)(CO))_{2}(NCO)]^{−}Na^{+}. This solid compound, available as tablets, is widely used as a disinfectant, to sterilize drinking water, swimming pools, tableware, farming installations, and air; and as an industrial deodorant. It is also used for bleaching textiles.
- Halazone, or 4-((dichloroamino)sulfonyl)benzoic acid, (HOOC)(C_{6}H_{4)}(SO_{2})(NCl_{2}). This compound was for a while used to disinfect drinking water in field situations, but has largely been replaced in that use by sodium dichloroisocyanurate.
- Chlorine dioxide, ClO_{2}. This is an unstable gas, which is usually prepared in situ or stored as dilute aqueous solutions. Despite these limitations it finds large-scale applications for the bleaching of wood pulp, fats and oils, cellulose, flour, textiles, beeswax, skin, and in a number of other industries. It has also been used for chlorination of tap water.

== Mechanism of action ==
The activity and applications of chlorine-releasing compounds are diverse. Some have strong oxidizing character. Chlorine readily inserts itself into double bonds, including those of aromatic rings, creating chlorinated organic compounds. This accounts for its bleaching action, since many colored organic substances owe their color to compounds with such bonds.

The extensive reactivity of chlorine is also responsible for its broad antimicrobial effect, since it can destroy or denature many proteins and other chemicals that are essential for microbes' metabolism.

=== Free chlorine ===
The strength of chlorine-releasing solutions, as well as their dosage in uses like water chlorination and pool sanitization, is usually expressed as mass concentration of "free chlorine" or "available chlorine". It is the mass of chlorine gas (Cl_{2}) that would yield the same oxidizing power as the product contained in (or applied to) a specific mass or volume of the liquid in question. The concentration can be expressed, for example, as grams per liter (g/L), milligrams per liter (mg/L), or parts per million (ppm). Thus, for example, "15 mg/L of available chlorine" means that the amount of product contained in one liter of the liquid has the same oxidizing power as 15 mg of chlorine.

The strength of commercial chlorine-releasing products may be instead specified as the concentration of the active ingredient, as mass or weight percent or grams per liter. In order to determine the free chlorine content of the product, one must take into account the oxidizing reactions that the ingredient may undergo in the application. For example, the label of a household bleach product may specify "5% sodium hypochlorite by weight." That would mean that 1 kilogram of the product contains 0.05 × 1000 g = 50 g of NaClO.

A typical oxidation reaction is the conversion of iodide I^{−} to elemental iodine I_{2}. The relevant reactions are

NaClO + 2 H^{+} + 2 I^{−} → NaCl + H_{2}O + I_{2}
Cl_{2} + 2 H^{+} + 2 I^{−} → 2 Cl^{−} + H_{2}O + I_{2}

That is, one "molecule" of NaClO has the same oxidizing power as one molecule of Cl_{2}. Their molar masses are 74.44 g and 70.90 g, respectively. Therefore, 1 kilogram of the solution has 1000 × 0.05 × 70.90/74.44 = 47.62 g of "free chlorine".

In order to convert between mass ratios and mass per volume, one must take into account the density of the liquid in question. For chlorinated water, one can assume the density is the same as of pure water, about 1000 g/L (more precisely, about 997 g/L at 25 °C). For more concentrated solutions like liquid bleach, the density depends on the ingredients and their concentrations, and is usually obtained from tables. When diluting a product, one must be aware that the volume of the diluted solution may not be the sum of the volumes of product and water. For example, one ml of 5.25 wt% NaClO bleach added to ten liters of water, will yield a NaClO concentration of about 5.76 mg/L, and 5.48 mg/L of free chlorine.

== History ==
Swedish chemist Scheele discovered chlorine in 1774, and in 1785 French scientist Claude Louis Berthollet recognized that it could be used to bleach fabrics. Berthollet also discovered potassium hypochlorite, which became the first commercial bleaching product, named Eau de Javel ("Javel water") after the borough in Paris where it was produced.

Scottish chemist and industrialist Charles Tennant proposed in 1798 a solution of calcium hypochlorite as an alternative for Javel water, and patented bleaching powder (a solid product containing calcium hypochlorite) in 1799.

Around 1820, French chemist Labarraque discovered the disinfecting ability of hypochlorites, and popularized the use of the cheaper sodium hypochlorite solution (known as Eau de Labarraque, "Labarraque's water") throughout the world for that purpose. His work greatly improved medical practice, public health, the sanitary conditions in hospitals, slaughterhouses, and all industries dealing with animal products—decades before Pasteur and others established the germ theory of disease. In particular, it led to the nearly universal practice of chlorination of tap water to prevent the spread of diseases like typhoid fever and cholera.

In 1915, British chemist Henry Dakin, working at a field hospital in France during World War I, did an extensive study of compounds that could be used to disinfect wounds and prevent sepsis. He found that chloramine was optimal, but settled for a dilute sodium hypochlorite solution—still used today with the name of "Dakin's solution"—for reasons of cost and availability.

== See also ==
- Peroxide-based bleach
- Ozone
