= Liquid bleach =

Chemical household product

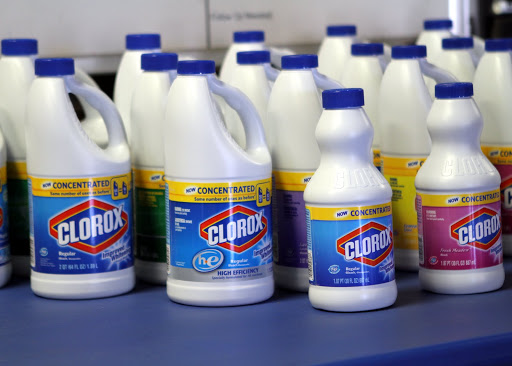
Liquid bleach (sodium hypochlorite solution) packaged for household use.

Liquid bleach, often called just bleach, is a common chemical household product that consists of a dilute solution of sodium hypochlorite (NaClO) and other secondary ingredients. It is a chlorine releasing bleaching agent widely used to whiten clothes and remove stains, as a disinfectant to kill germs, and for several other uses.

While the term has had this meaning for a long time, it may now be applied more generically to any liquid bleaching agent for laundry, irrespective of composition, such as peroxide-based bleaches.

== History ==
Potassium hypochlorite (KClO) was synthesized by French scientist Berthollet in 1789, by reacting chlorine gas (Cl_{2}) with a solution of potassium hydroxide (potash, KOH). He also discovered its cloth bleaching properties, and set out to commercialize it under the name of Eau de Javel ("water of Javel") after the borough of Paris where it was manufactured. It was the first product intended specifically for that application, and it shortened the process of bleaching newly made cloth from months to hours.

Scottish chemist and industrialist Charles Tennant proposed in 1798 a solution of calcium hypochlorite as an alternative for Javel water, and patented bleaching powder (solid calcium hypochlorite, Ca(ClO)_{2}) in 1799.

Around 1820, Antoine Labarraque substituted the much cheaper precursor sodium hydroxide (soda lye, NaOH) for potash, thus producing Eau de Labarraque, basically the same "liquid bleach" (NaClO) still in use today. He also discovered its disinfectant properties, and was instrumental in spreading it worldwide for that purpose. His work greatly improved medical practice, public health, the sanitary conditions in hospitals, slaughterhouses, and all industries dealing with animal products—decades before Pasteur and others established the germ theory of disease. In particular, it led to the nearly universal practice of chlorination of tap water to prevent the spread of diseases like typhoid fever and cholera.

== Composition ==
Formulations for household use usually contain 8% or less of sodium hypochlorite by weight, although more concentrated solutions of up to 50% are available for industrial use. Concentrated solutions present serious safety risks. Solid anhydrous sodium hypochlorite is unstable and decomposes explosively. A non-explosive hydrated solid is available for laboratory use, but must be kept refrigerated to avoid decomposition.

Liquid bleach usually contains also some sodium hydroxide (caustic soda or soda lye, NaOH), intended to keep the solution alkaline. Sodium chloride (table salt, NaCl) is often present too, and plays no role in the product's action. Sodium chloride and hydroxide are normal residues from the main production processes.
