= Bleach =

Chemicals used to whiten or disinfect

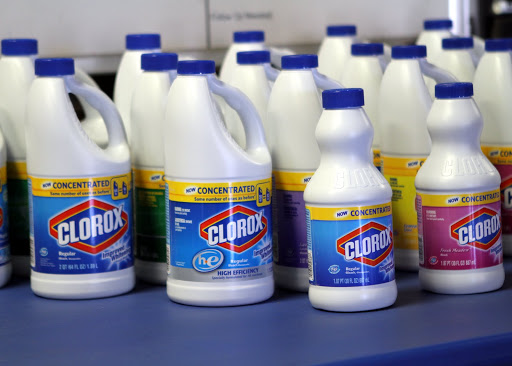
Clorox brand bleach

Bleach is the generic name for any chemical product that is used industrially or domestically to remove color from (i.e. to whiten) fabric, fiber, or food (in a process called bleaching) or to disinfect after cleaning. It often refers specifically to a dilute solution of sodium hypochlorite, also called "liquid bleach".

Many bleaches have broad-spectrum bactericidal properties, making them useful for disinfecting and sterilizing. Liquid bleach is one of the few compounds capable of fully annihilating DNA, making it commonplace for sanitizing laboratory equipment. Bleach is also commonly used in medical centers to sanitize equipment. They are used in swimming pool sanitation to control bacteria, viruses, and algae and in many places where sterile conditions are required. They are also used in many industrial processes, notably in the bleaching of wood pulp. Bleaches also have other minor uses, such as removing mildew, killing weeds, and increasing the longevity of cut flowers.

Bleaches work by reacting with many colored organic compounds, such as natural pigments, and turning them into colorless ones. While most bleaches are oxidizing agents (chemicals that can remove electrons from other molecules), some are reducing agents (that donate electrons).

Chlorine, a powerful oxidizer, is the active agent in many household bleaches. Since pure chlorine is a toxic corrosive gas, these products usually contain hypochlorite, which releases chlorine. "Bleaching powder" usually refers to a formulation containing calcium hypochlorite.

Oxidizing bleaching agents that do not contain chlorine are usually based on peroxides, such as hydrogen peroxide, sodium percarbonate, and sodium perborate. These bleaches are called "non-chlorine bleach", "oxygen bleach", or "color-safe bleach".

Reducing bleaches have niche uses, such as sulfur dioxide, which is used to bleach wool, either as gas or from solutions of sodium dithionite, and sodium borohydride.

Bleaches generally react with many other organic substances besides the intended colored pigments, so they can weaken or damage natural materials such as fibers, cloth, and leather, and intentionally applied dyes, such as the indigo of denim. For the same reason, ingestion of the products, breathing of the fumes, or contact with skin or eyes can cause bodily harm and damage health.

== History ==
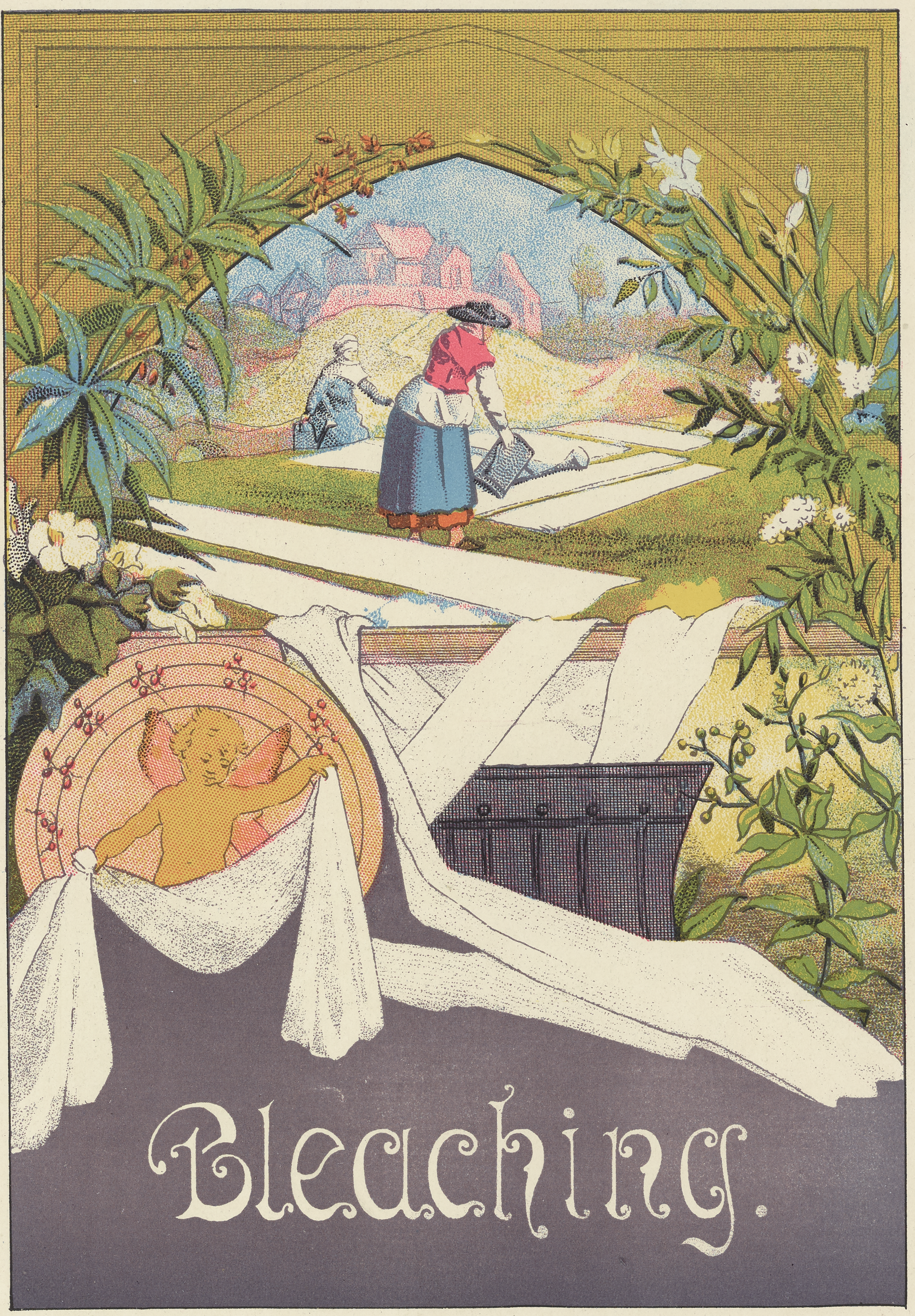
Early method of bleaching cotton and linen goods on lawns, using a combination of exposure to direct sunlight and the application of water

The earliest form of bleaching involved spreading fabrics and cloth out in a bleachfield to be whitened by the action of the Sun and water. In the 17th century, there was a significant cloth bleaching industry in Western Europe, using alternating alkaline baths (generally lye) and acid baths (such as lactic acid from sour milk, and later diluted sulfuric acid). The whole process lasted up to six months.

Chlorine-based bleaches, which shortened that process from months to hours, were invented in Europe in the late 18th century. German-Swedish chemist Carl Wilhelm Scheele discovered chlorine in 1774, and in 1785 Savoyard scientist Claude Berthollet recognized that it could be used to bleach fabrics. Berthollet also discovered sodium hypochlorite, which became the first commercial bleach, named Eau de Javel ("Javel water") after the borough of Javel, near Paris, where it was produced.

Scottish chemist and industrialist Charles Tennant proposed in 1798 a solution of calcium hypochlorite as an alternative for Javel water, and patented bleaching powder (solid calcium hypochlorite) in 1799. Around 1820, French chemist Antoine Germain Labarraque discovered the disinfecting and deodorizing ability of hypochlorites and was instrumental in popularizing their use for such purpose. His work greatly improved medical practice, public health, and the sanitary conditions in hospitals, slaughterhouses, and all industries dealing with animal products.

Louis Jacques Thénard first produced hydrogen peroxide in 1818 by reacting barium peroxide with nitric acid. Hydrogen peroxide was first used for bleaching in 1882, but did not become commercially important until after 1930. Sodium perborate as a laundry bleach has been used in Europe since the early twentieth century, and became popular in North America in the 1980s.

Chlorine-based bleaches have been used since the late 18th century to whiten cotton and linen clothes, removing either the natural fiber color or stains of sweat or other organic residues. They are still used in households for laundry and to remove organic stains (such as mildew) on surfaces.

== Types of bleaches ==
Most industrial and household bleaches belong to three broad classes:

- Chlorine-based bleaches, whose active agent is chlorine, usually from the decomposition of some chlorine compound such as hypochlorite or chloramine.
- Peroxide-based bleaches, whose active agent is oxygen, almost always from the decomposition of a peroxide compound such as hydrogen peroxide.
- Sulfur dioxide-based bleaches, whose active agent is sulfur dioxide, possibly from the decomposition of some oxosulfur anion.

=== Chlorine-based bleaches ===
Chlorine-based bleaches are found in many household "bleach" products, as well as in specialized products for hospitals, public health, water chlorination, and industrial processes. The grade of chlorine-based bleaches is often expressed as percent active chlorine. One gram of 100% active chlorine bleach has the same bleaching power as one gram of elemental chlorine.

Some common chlorine-based bleaches are the following:

- Chlorine gas (Cl_{2}). It is used as a disinfectant in water treatment, especially to make drinking water and in large public swimming pools. It was used extensively to bleach wood pulp, but this use has decreased significantly due to environmental concerns.
- Sodium hypochlorite, NaOCl. This chlorine-releasing compound is the most common bleaching and disinfection compound. A dilute (3–6%) aqueous solution in water, historically known as Eau de Labarraque or "Labarraque's water", is widely marketed as a household cleaning product, under the name "liquid bleach" or simply "bleach". More concentrated solutions are used to disinfect drinking water and as bleaching agents in industrial processes. A more diluted solution (up to 0.5%) has been in use since 1915 to cleanse and disinfect wounds, under the name of Dakin's solution. Sodium hypochlorite, usually as a 3–6% solution in water, usually called "liquid bleach" or just "bleach". Historically called "Javel water" (French: eau de Javel). It is used in many households to whiten laundry, disinfect hard surfaces in kitchens and bathrooms, treat water for drinking, and keep swimming pools free of infectious agents.
- Calcium hypochlorite, Ca(OCl)_{2}. This product, known as "bleaching powder" or "chlorinated lime", it is used in many of the same applications as sodium hypochlorite, but is more stable and contains more available chlorine. It is usually marketed as a white powder that contains, besides the hypochlorite, also calcium hydroxide Ca(OH)_{2} ("lime") and calcium chloride CaCl_{2}. A purer, more stable form of calcium hypochlorite is called HTH or high test hypochlorite. It is also available as bleaching tablets that contain calcium hypochlorite and other ingredients to prevent the tablets from crumbling. A supposedly more stable mixture of calcium hypochlorite and quicklime (calcium oxide) is known as "tropical bleach". Percent active chlorine in these materials ranges from 20% for bleaching powder to 70% for HTH. Sold as a white powder or in tablets, it is used in many of the same applications as sodium hypochlorite but is more stable and contains more available chlorine.
- Potassium hypochlorite, KOCl. This was the first chlorine-based bleaching agent, which became available around 1785 under the name Eau de Javel or "Javel water". It is no longer commonly used, having been superseded by the cheaper sodium analog.
- Chloramine, NH_{2}Cl. This chemical is commonly handled as a dilute aqueous solution. It is used as an alternative to chlorine and sodium hypochlorite for disinfection of drinking water and swimming pools.
- Chloramine-T, or tosylchloramide sodium salt, Na^{+}[CH_{3}C_{6}H_{4}SO_{2}NCl)]^{−}. This solid compound is available in tablet or powder form, and used in medical establishments to disinfect surfaces, equipment, and instruments.
- Sodium dichloroisocyanurate [((ClN)(CO))_{2}(NCO)]^{−}Na^{+}. This solid compound, available as tablets, is widely used as a disinfectant, to sterilize drinking water, swimming pools, tableware, farming installations, and air; and as an industrial deodorant. It is also used for bleaching textiles.
- Halazone, or 4-((dichloroamino)sulfonyl)benzoic acid, (HOOC)(C_{6}H_{4)}(SO_{2})(NCl_{2}). This compound was for a while used to disinfect drinking water in field situations, but has largely been replaced in that use by sodium dichloroisocyanurate. This unstable gas is generated in situ or stored as dilute aqueous solutions. It finds large-scale applications for the bleaching of wood pulp, fats and oils, cellulose, flour, textiles, beeswax, skin, and in a number of other industries.
- Chlorine dioxide, ClO_{2}. This is an unstable gas, which is usually prepared in situ or stored as dilute aqueous solutions. Despite these limitations it finds large-scale applications for the bleaching of wood pulp, fats and oils, cellulose, flour, textiles, beeswax, skin, and in a number of other industries. It has also been used for chlorination of tap water.

=== Peroxide-based bleaches ===
Peroxide-based bleaches are characterized by the peroxide chemical group, namely two oxygen atoms connected by a single bond, (–O–O–). This bond is easily broken, giving rise to very reactive oxygen species, which are the active agents of this type of bleach.

The main products in this class are the following:

- Hydrogen peroxide (H_{2}O_{2}). It is used, for example, to bleach wood pulp, hair and teeth, or to prepare other bleaching agents such as perborates, percarbonates, peracids, etc.
- Sodium percarbonate (Na_{2}H_{3}CO_{6}), an adduct of hydrogen peroxide and sodium carbonate ("soda ash" or "washing soda", Na_{2}CO_{3}). Dissolved in water, it yields a solution of the two products, that combines the degreasing action of the carbonate with the bleaching action of the peroxide.
- Sodium perborate (Na_{2}H_{4}B_{2}O_{8}). Dissolved in water it forms some hydrogen peroxide, but also the perborate anion (B(OOH)(OH)^{−}_{3}) which can perform nucleophilic oxidation.
- Peracetic (peroxoacetic) acid (H_{3}CC(O)OOH). Generated in situ by some laundry detergents, and also marketed for use as industrial and agricultural disinfection and water treatment.
- Benzoyl peroxide ((C_{6}H_{5}COO)_{2}). It is used in topical medications for acne and to bleach flour.
- Ozone (O_{3}). While not properly a peroxide, its mechanism of action is similar. It is used in the manufacture of paper products, especially newsprint and white kraft paper.
- Potassium persulfate (K_{2} S_{2}O_{8}) and other persulfate salts. It, alongside ammonium and sodium persulfate, is common in hair-lightening products.
- Permanganate salts such as potassium permanganate (KMnO_{4}).

In the food industry, other oxidizing products such as bromates are used as flour bleaching and maturing agents.

=== Reducing bleaches ===
Sodium dithionite (also known as sodium hydrosulfite) is one of the most important reductive bleaching agents. It is a white crystalline powder with a weak sulfurous odor. It can be obtained by reacting sodium bisulfite with zinc.

2 NaHSO_{3} + Zn → Na_{2}S_{2}O_{4} + Zn(OH)_{2}

It is used as such in some industrial dyeing processes to eliminate excess dye, residual oxide, and unintended pigments and for bleaching wood pulp.

Reaction of sodium dithionite with formaldehyde produces Rongalite.

Na_{2}S_{2}O_{4} + 2 CH_{2}O + H_{2}O → NaHOCH_{2}SO_{3} + NaHOCH_{2}SO_{2}

Thus is used in bleaching wood pulp, cotton, wool, leather and clay.

=== Photographic bleach ===
In negative film processing, silver halide grains are associated with couplers which, on development, produce metallic silver and a colored image. The silver is 'bleached' to a soluble form in a solution of ferric EDTA, which is then dissolved in 'fix', a solution of sodium or ammonium thiosulfate. The procedure is the same for paper processing except that the EDTA and thiosulfate are mixed in 'bleachfix'.

In reversal processing, residual silver in the emulsion after the first development is reduced to a soluble silver salt using a chemical bleach, most commonly EDTA. A conventional fixer then dissolves the reduced silver but leaves the unexposed silver halide intact. This unexposed halide is then exposed to light or chemically treated so that a second development produces a positive image. In color and chromogenic film, this also generates a dye image in proportion to the silver.

Photographic bleaches are also used in black-and-white photography to selectively reduce silver to reduce silver density in negatives or prints. In such cases, the bleach composition is typically an acid solution of potassium dichromate.

== Environmental impact ==
A Risk Assessment Report (RAR) conducted by the European Union on sodium hypochlorite conducted under Regulation EEC 793/93 concluded that this substance is safe for the environment in all its current, normal uses. This is due to its high reactivity and instability. The disappearance of hypochlorite is practically immediate in the natural aquatic environment, reaching in a short time concentration as low as 10^{−22} μg/L or less in all emission scenarios. In addition, it was found that while volatile chlorine species may be relevant in some indoor scenarios, they have a negligible impact in open environmental conditions. Further, the role of hypochlorite pollution is assumed as negligible in soils.

Industrial bleaching agents can be a source of concern. For example, the use of elemental chlorine in the bleaching of wood pulp produces organochlorines and persistent organic pollutants, including dioxins. According to an industry group, the use of chlorine dioxide in these processes has reduced the dioxin generation to under-detectable levels. However, the respiratory risk from chlorine and highly toxic chlorinated byproducts still exists.

A European study conducted in 2008 indicated that sodium hypochlorite and organic chemicals (e.g., surfactants, fragrances) contained in several household cleaning products can react to generate chlorinated volatile organic compounds (VOCs). These chlorinated compounds are emitted during cleaning applications, some of which are toxic and probable human carcinogens. The study showed that indoor air concentrations significantly increase (8–52 times for chloroform and 1–1170 times for carbon tetrachloride, respectively, above baseline quantities in the household) during the use of bleach-containing products. The increase in chlorinated volatile organic compound concentrations was the lowest for plain bleach and the highest for the products in the form of "thick liquid and gel".

The significant increases observed in indoor air concentrations of several chlorinated VOCs (especially carbon tetrachloride and chloroform) indicate that bleach use may be a source that could be important in terms of inhalation exposure to these compounds. While the authors suggested that using these cleaning products may significantly increase the cancer risk, this conclusion appears to be hypothetical:

- The highest level cited for a concentration of carbon tetrachloride (seemingly of highest concern) is 459 micrograms per cubic meter, translating to 0.073 ppm (part per million), or 73 ppb (part per billion). The OSHA-allowable time-weighted average concentration over eight hours is 10 ppm, almost 140 times higher;
- The OSHA highest allowable peak concentration (5-minute exposure for five minutes in 4 hours) is 200 ppm, twice as high as the reported highest peak level (from the headspace of a bottle of a sample of bleach plus detergent).

== Uses ==
=== Whitening ===
Colors of natural organic materials typically arise from organic pigments, such as beta carotene. Chemical bleaches work in one of two ways:

- An oxidizing bleach works by breaking the chemical bonds that make up the chromophore. This changes the molecule into a different substance that either does not contain a chromophore or contains a chromophore that does not absorb visible light. This is the mechanism of bleaches based on chlorine but also of oxygen-anions which react through the initial nucleophilic attack.
- A reducing bleach works by converting double bonds in the chromophore into single bonds. This eliminates the ability of the chromophore to absorb visible light. This is the mechanism of bleaches based on sulfur dioxide.

Sunlight acts as a bleach through a process leading to similar results: high-energy photons of light, often in the violet or ultraviolet range, can disrupt the bonds in the chromophore, rendering the resulting substance colorless. Extended exposure often leads to massive discoloration usually reducing the colors to a white and typically very faded blue.

Colors of natural materials typically arise from organic pigments, such as beta carotene. Chlorine-based compounds work by breaking the chemical bonds that make up the pigment's chromophore. This changes the molecule into a different substance that either does not contain a chromophore, or contains a chromophore that does not absorb visible light.

Industrially, chlorine-based bleaches are used in a wide variety of processes, including bleaching of wood pulp.

=== Disinfection ===
The broad-spectrum effectiveness of most bleaches is due to their general chemical reactivity against organic compounds, rather than the selective inhibitory or toxic actions of antibiotics. They irreversibly denature or destroy many proteins, including all prions, making them extremely versatile disinfectants.

Hypochlorite bleaches in low concentration were also found to attack bacteria by interfering with heat shock proteins on their walls. According to 2013 Home Hygiene and Health report, using bleach, whether chlorine- or peroxide-based, significantly increases germicidal efficiency of laundry even at low temperatures (30-40 degrees Celsius), which makes it possible to eliminate viruses, bacteria, and fungi from a variety of clothing in a home setting.

Sodium hypochlorite solution, 3–6%, (common household bleach) is typically diluted for safe use when disinfecting surfaces and when used to treat drinking water.

A weak solution of 2% household bleach in warm water is typical for sanitizing smooth surfaces before the brewing of beer or wine.

US government regulations (21 CFR 178 Subpart C) allow food processing equipment and food contact surfaces to be sanitized with solutions containing bleach, provided that the solution is allowed to drain adequately before contact with food and that the solutions do not exceed 200 parts per million (ppm) available chlorine (for example, one tablespoon of typical household bleach containing 5.25% sodium hypochlorite, per gallon of water).

A 1-in-47 dilution of household bleach with water (1 part bleach to 47 parts water: e.g. one teaspoon of bleach in a cup of water, or 21 ml per litre, or 1/3 cup of bleach in a gallon of water) is effective against many bacteria and some viruses in homes. Even "scientific-grade", commercially produced disinfection solutions such as Virocidin-X usually have sodium hypochlorite as their sole active ingredient, though they also contain surfactants (to prevent beading) and fragrances (to conceal the bleach smell).

See hypochlorous acid for a discussion of the mechanism for disinfectant action.

An oral rinse with a 0.05% dilute solution of household bleach is shown to treat gingivitis.

== Color-safe bleach ==
Color-safe bleach is a solution with hydrogen peroxide as the active ingredient (for stain removal) rather than sodium hypochlorite or chlorine. It also contains chemicals that help brighten colors. Though hydrogen peroxide is used for sterilization purposes and water treatment, its ability to disinfect laundry is limited because the concentration of hydrogen peroxide in laundry products is lower than what is used in other applications.

== Reactions ==
=== Release of chlorine gas ===
Mixing a hypochlorite bleach with an acid can liberate chlorine gas.

Chlorine is a respiratory irritant that attacks mucous membranes and burns the skin. As little as 3.53 ppm can be detected as an odor, and 1000 ppm is likely to be fatal after a few deep breaths. Exposure to chlorine has been limited to 0.5 ppm (8-hour time-weighted average—38-hour week) by the U.S. OSHA. Due to transport and handling safety concerns, the use of sodium hypochlorite is preferred over chlorine gas in water treatment.

=== Reaction with acids ===
Mixing an acid cleaner with a hypochlorite bleach can cause toxic chlorine gas to be released. The hypochlorite anion and chlorine are in equilibrium in water; the position of the equilibrium is pH dependent and low pH (acidic) favors chlorine,

Cl_{2} + H_{2}O ⇌ 2H^{+} + Cl^{−} + ClO^{−}

A hypochlorite bleach can react violently with hydrogen peroxide and produce oxygen gas:

H_{2}O_{2}(aq) + NaOCl (aq) → NaCl (aq) + H_{2}O(l) + O_{2}(g)

A 2008 study indicated that sodium hypochlorite and organic chemicals (e.g., surfactants, fragrances) contained in several household cleaning products can react to generate chlorinated volatile organic compounds (VOCs). These chlorinated compounds are emitted during cleaning applications, some of which are toxic and probable human carcinogens. The study showed that indoor air concentrations significantly increase (8–52 times for chloroform and 1–1170 times for carbon tetrachloride, respectively, above baseline quantities in the household) during the use of bleach-containing products. The increase in chlorinated volatile organic compound concentrations was the lowest for plain bleach and the highest for the products in the form of "thick liquid and gel." The significant increases observed in indoor air concentrations of several chlorinated VOCs (especially carbon tetrachloride and chloroform) indicate that the bleach use may be a source that could be important in terms of inhalation exposure to these compounds. The authors suggested that using these cleaning products may significantly increase the cancer risk.

=== With ammonia ===
The hypochlorites in liquid bleach and bleaching powder can react with ammonia to form a number of products, including monochloramine (NH_{2}Cl), then dichloramine (NHCl_{2}) and finally nitrogen trichloride (NCl_{3}). Similar reactions may occur with amines or related compounds and biological materials (such as urine). The result depends on the temperature, concentration, and how they are mixed. These compounds are very irritating to the eyes and lungs and are toxic above certain concentrations. Chronic exposure, for example, from the air at swimming pools where chlorine is used as the disinfectant, can lead to the development of atopic asthma. Nitrogen trichloride is also a very sensitive explosive.

=== Corrosion ===
Chlorine releasing products may also cause corrosion of many materials and unintended bleaching of colored products. Chlorine-based compounds can often be rinsed off after application to avoid corrosion of metals and degradation of organic materials.

=== Neutralization ===
Sodium thiosulfate is an effective chlorine neutralizer. Rinsing with a 5 mg/L solution, followed by washing with soap and water, will remove chlorine odor from the hands.

== Safety ==
Chlorine-releasing products present significant risks. It is estimated that, in 2002, there were about 3300 accidents needing hospital treatment caused by liquid bleach in British homes, and about 160 due to bleaching powder.

=== Chemical burns ===
Chlorine-releasing solutions, such as liquid bleach and solutions of bleaching powder, can burn the skin and cause eye damage, especially when used in concentrated forms. As recognized by the NFPA, however, only solutions containing more than 40% sodium hypochlorite by weight are considered hazardous oxidizers. Solutions less than 40% are classified as a moderate oxidizing hazard (NFPA 430, 2000).

=== Chlorine release ===
Chlorine, a respiratory irritant that attacks mucous membranes and burns the skin, can be released from bleach. Due to transport and handling safety concerns, the use of sodium hypochlorite is preferred over chlorine gas in water treatment.

== Health hazards ==
The safety of bleaches depends on the compounds present, and their concentration. Generally speaking, the ingestion of bleaches will cause damage to the esophagus and stomach, possibly leading to death. On contact with the skin or eyes, it causes irritation, drying, and potentially burns. Inhalation of bleach fumes can cause mild irritation of the upper airways. Personal protective equipment should always be used when using bleach.

=== Chemical interactions ===
Bleach should never be mixed with vinegar or other acids, as this will create highly toxic chlorine gas, which can cause severe burns internally and externally. Mixing bleach with ammonia similarly produces nitrogen trichloride, which is a potentially explosive substance with a foul, irritating and acrid odor. Mixing bleach with isopropanol or acetone makes chloroform, while mixing with hydrogen peroxide results in an exothermic and potentially explosive chemical reaction that releases oxygen.

=== False claims as a cure ===
Miracle Mineral Supplement (MMS), also promoted as "Master Mineral Solution" or "Chlorine Dioxide Solution" or CDS, to evade restrictions by online retail platforms, is a bleach solution that has been fraudulently promoted as a cure-all since 2006. Its main active ingredient is sodium chlorite, which is "activated" with citric acid to form chlorine dioxide. In an attempt to evade health regulations, its inventor, Jim Humble, a former Scientologist, founded the Genesis II Church of Health and Healing, which considers MMS as its sacrament.

== See also ==
- Calcium hypochlorite
- Hydrogen peroxide
- Milton sterilizing fluid
- Tooth whitening
- Washing soda
