= Rockefeller War Demonstration Hospital =

United States military hospital

United States Army Auxiliary Hospital No. 1
- U.S. Army Medical Department
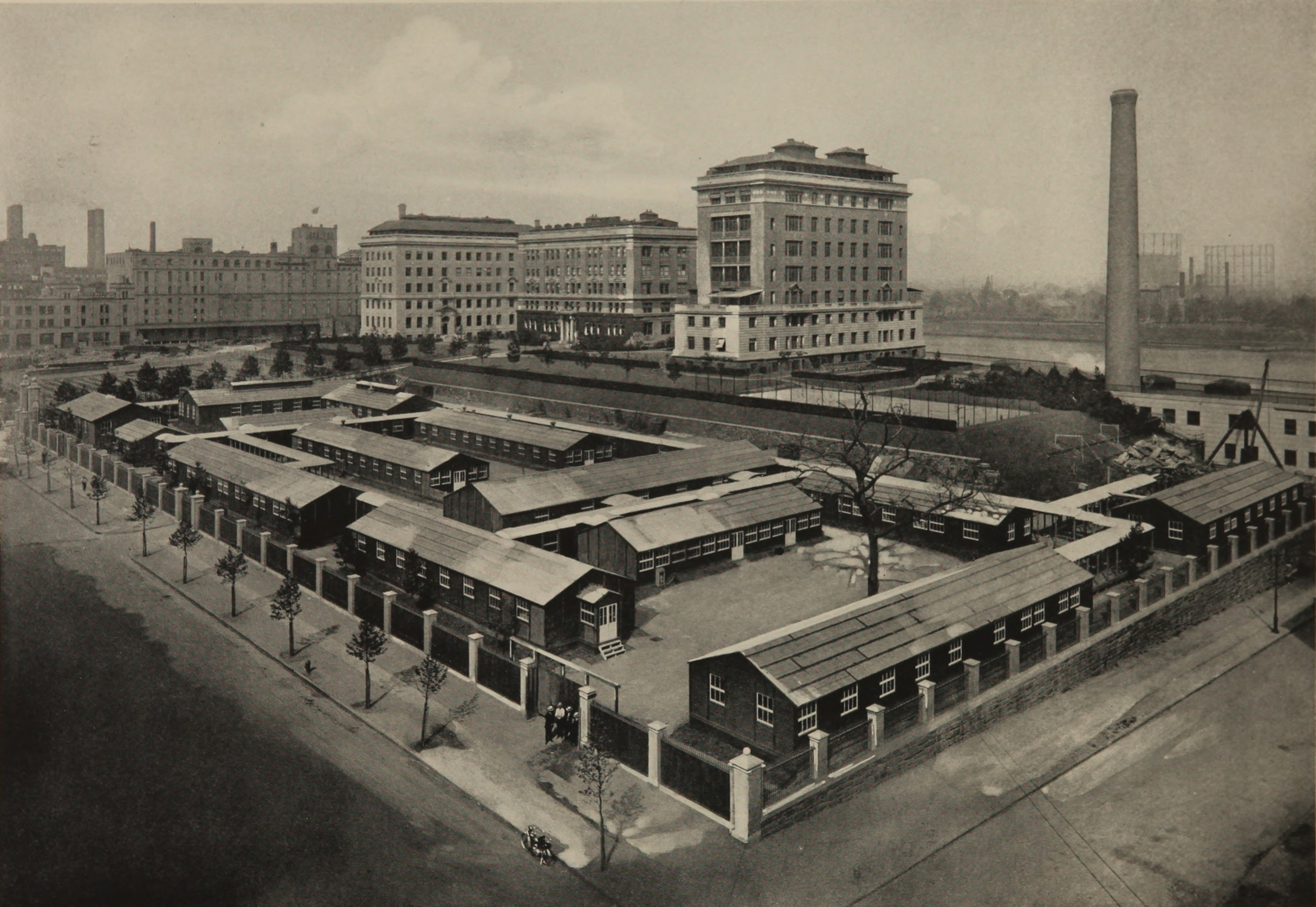
- Rockefeller War Demonstration Hospital

Geography
- Location: Rockefeller University campus, Upper East Side, Manhattan, New York, United States
- Coordinates: 40°45′45″N 73°57′20″W

Organization
- Care system: U.S. Army Medical Department
- Type: Specialist
- Affiliated university: Rockefeller Institute for Medical Research

Services
- Speciality: Field

History
- Former name: Rockefeller War Demonstration Hospital
- Opened: July 26, 1917
- Closed: April 5, 1919

Links
- Lists: Hospitals in New York State
- Other links: Hospitals in Manhattan; Former United States Army medical units

Rockefeller Demonstration Hospital, also known as Rockefeller base hospital and United States Army Auxiliary Hospital No. 1 was a World War One era field hospital designed, located and operated by Rockefeller Institute for Medical Research in Manhattan, New York City.

== History ==
The hospital received its first patient on July 26, 1917. The hospital was set up to promote the newly created Carrel–Dakin method, which was developed for the Rockefeller Institute for Medical Research by Alexis Carrel and Henry Drysdale Dakin.

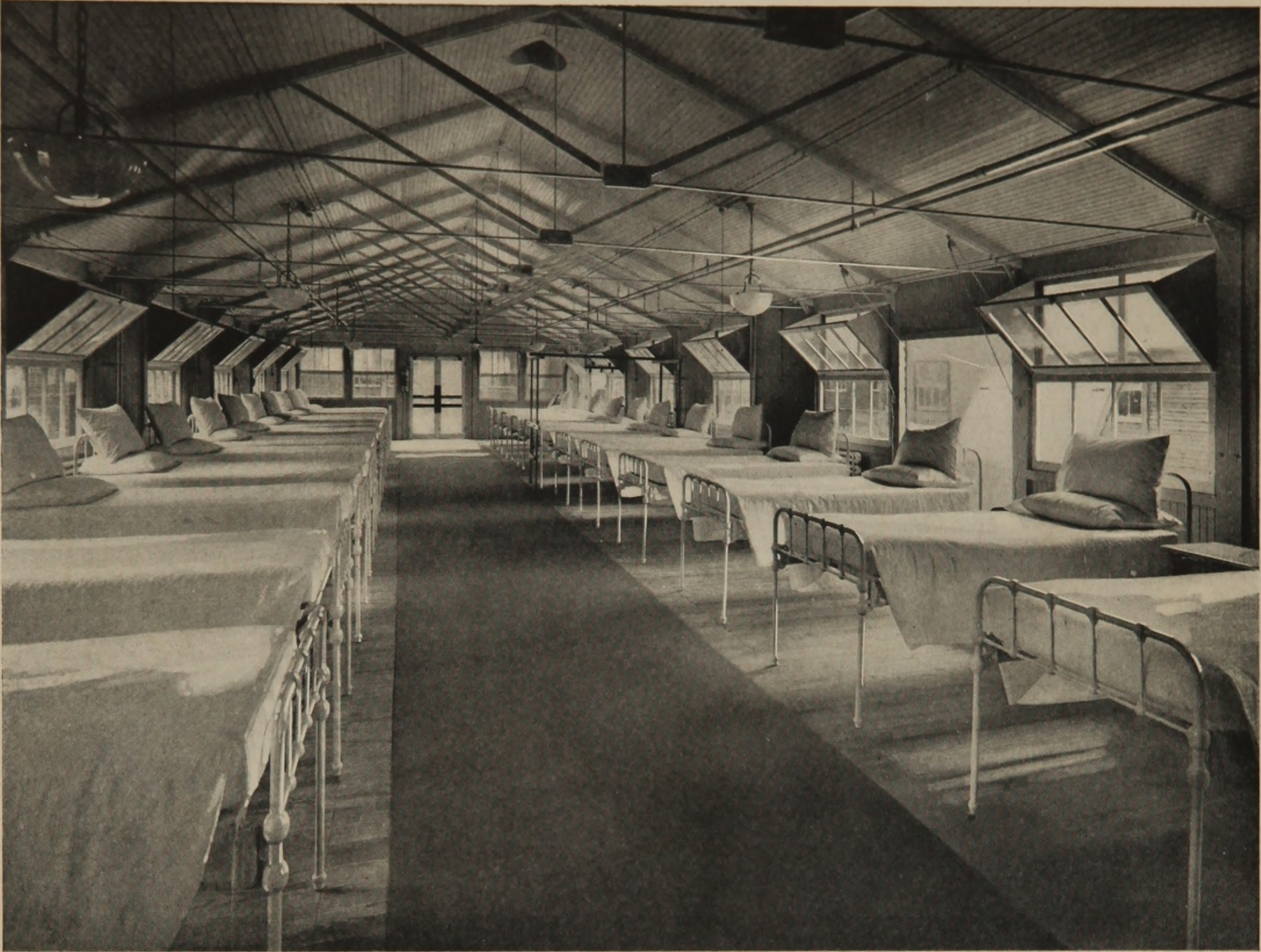
One of the hospital wards.

On August 24, 1918 Rockefeller War Demonstration Hospital became United States Army Auxiliary Hospital No. 1, under the commanding general of what was then called the Hoboken Port of Embarkation (later renamed to New York Port of Embarkation).

Between August 24, 1918 and its closure, the hospital trained 998 Medical Corps officers and enlisted men of the Army and Navy in the Carrel–Dakin method and treated 237 patients.

The war demonstration hospital was closed on April 5, 1919

Nancy Poultney Ellicott (1872-1944), Rockefeller Institute for Medical Research's Superintendent of Nurses (1909 - 1938) received a Medal of Honor from the Minister of Hygiene of France in 1926 for her work at the Rockefeller War Demonstration Hospital.

== See also ==
- U.S. Army General Hospital No. 1 - previously Columbia War Hospital.
