= U.S. Army General Hospital No. 1 =

United States military hospital

- U.S. Army Medical Department
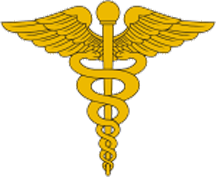

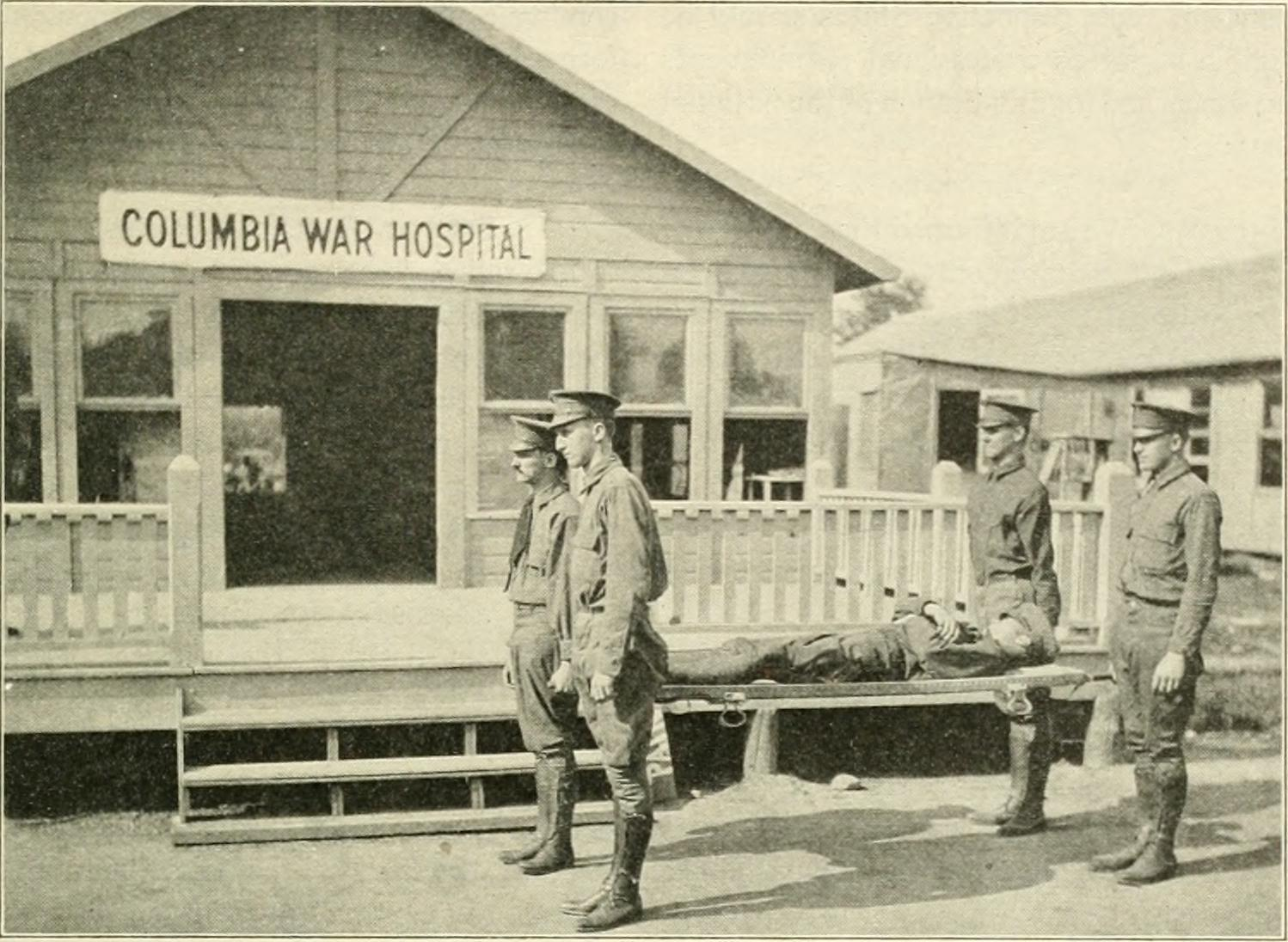
- Main façade of the Columbia War Hospital

Geography
- Location: Columbia Oval (Gun Hill Road and Bainbridge Avenue), Norwood, The Bronx, New York, United States
- Coordinates: 40.881025°N 73.876501°W

Organization
- Care system: U.S. Army Medical Department
- Type: General
- Affiliated university: Columbia University

Services
- Beds: Over 1,000

History
- Former name: Columbia War Hospital
- Opened: July 1917
- Closed: October 15, 1919

Links
- Lists: Hospitals in New York State
- Other links: Hospitals in the Bronx; Former United States Army medical units

U.S. Army General Hospital No. 1, also known as Columbia War Hospital, was a World War I era field hospital built by Columbia University on the Columbia Oval property in Norwood, The Bronx. The hospital was used as a medical training facility, a model for military field hospitals, and for long-term treatment of patients.

== Columbia Oval ==
The property that the hospital was built on was an athletic field owned by Columbia University called "Columbia Oval". The hospital property was in what was then considered part of the Williamsbridge neighborhood. The location is now part of the Norwood neighborhood. Columbia Oval was the finish line of the first marathon within the United States, in 1896. The marathon was won by John McDermott, a year before he won the first Boston Marathon in 1897.

== Columbia War Hospital ==
The Columbia War Hospital was conceived by the head of Columbia's Department of Urology, J. Bentley Squier in March, 1917 Construction began the following month, and the hospital was ready to admit patients by May 30, 1917.

== General Hospital No. 1 ==
The hospital was renamed by the army to "United States Army General Hospital No. 1" in August, 1917. The hospital was transferred over to Colonel E. R. Schreiner of the United States Army on October 3, 1917, in a ceremony conducted by Columbia university's president Nicholas Murray Butler.

== Additional facilities ==
The hospital had additional facilities in:

- The Montefiore Home, (Norwood, Bronx), located across the street from the hospital, provided accommodations for military officers at a newly created facility called "Van Cortlandt Private Hospital".
- The Messiah Home for Children, 1771 Andrews Avenue University Heights, Bronx, and the adjacent Camp Estate, both provided by the Catholic War Council with a nominal rent of $1 per month.
- Bloomingdale Hospital (in White Plains, New York)

== Later history ==
The hospital was closed on October 15, 1919. After the end of the war, the 54 buildings that made up the Columbia Oval site were razed. Former patients who required long-term care after the closing of the hospital were transferred to the care of Montefiore Medical Center. In October 1922, the 19-acre site was auctioned by the university as 225 separate lots for a total of $351,950 (equivalent to $6.8 million in 2025). One of the streets created on the former field is named "Kings College Place", after Columbia University's original name.

== Gallery ==
1914 Map of the hospital grounds bounded by Bainbridge Ave., E. 211th St., E. Gun Hill Rd.)

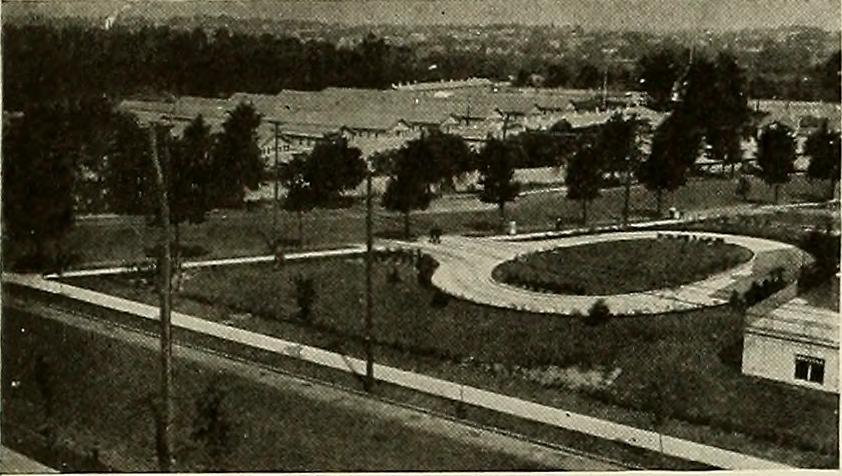
Columbia War Hospital viewed from south of Gun Hill Road

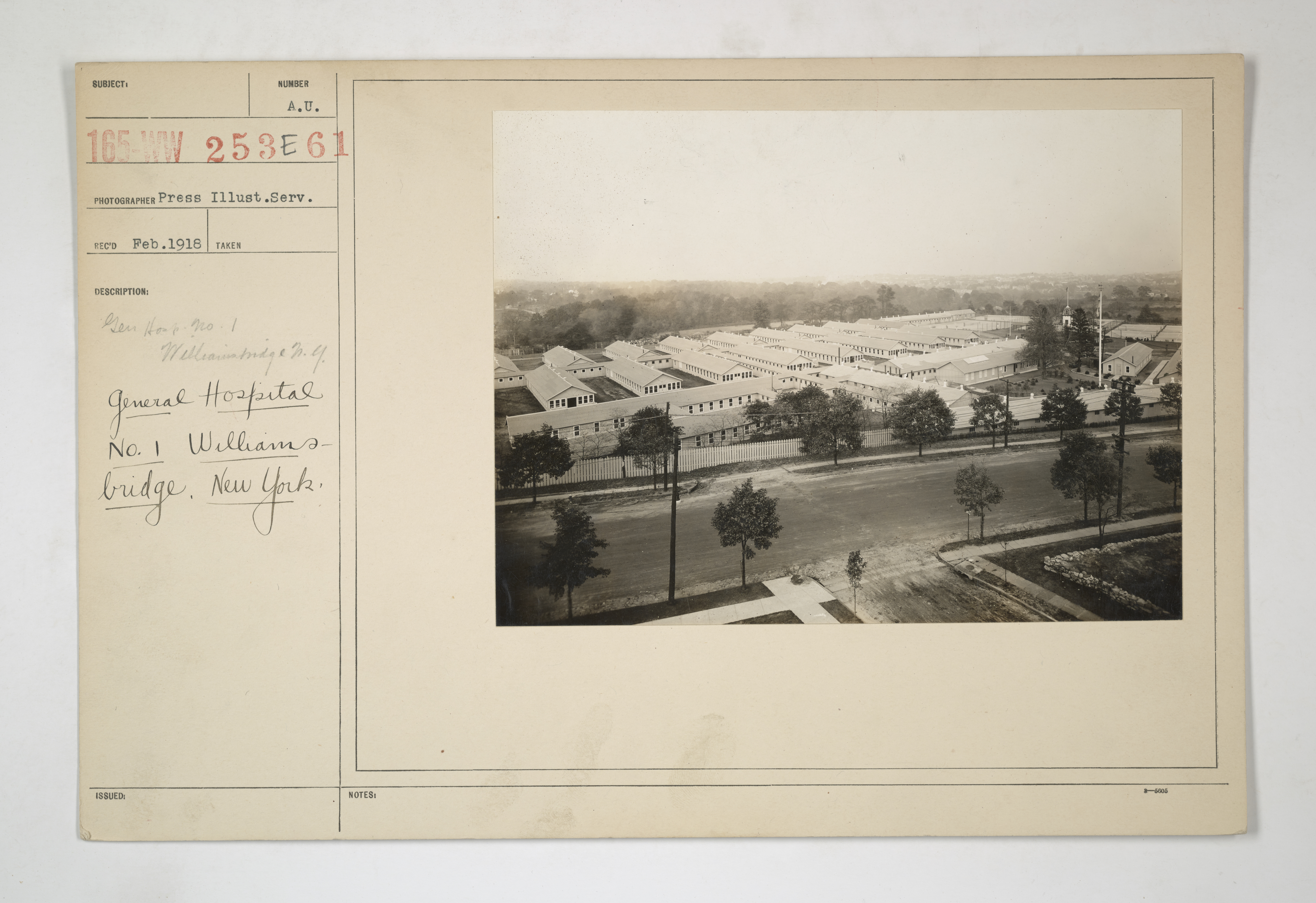
General Hospital No. 1. Williamsbridge (now Norwood), The Bronx

== See also ==
- John McDermott (runner)
- Montefiore Medical Center
- National Catholic Welfare Council
- Pelham Bay Naval Training Station
- Rockefeller War Demonstration Hospital
- Woodlawn Cemetery (Bronx)
