= Julius B. Cohen =

English chemist (1859–1935)

Julius Berend Cohen FRS
- Julius Berend Cohen, FRS © National Portrait Gallery, London
- Born: 6 May 1859; Eccles, England
- Died: 14 June 1935 (aged 76); Coniston, England
- Burial place: St Andrew, Coniston
- Occupation: Chemist
- Notable work: See list
- Spouse: Hilda Hughes
- Children: Adolph Broadfield (1893); Mary (1894); Margaret Eva (1898); Hugh Thurston (1901)

Julius Berend Cohen FRS (6 May 1859 in Eccles – 14 June 1935 in Coniston) was an English chemist. He studied chemistry with Hans von Pechmann at the Ludwig-Maximilians-Universität München. One of his students was Henry Drysdale Dakin.

== Biography ==
Julius Berend Cohen and his twin brother Adolf were the only boys of ten children of Sigismund Cohen, a cotton merchant born in Hamburg, and Zena, née Berend, from South Shields, who were married in Manchester. Julius was born on 6 May 1859 in Eccles. Adolf fulfilled his father's hope that he would join the family business. Julius tried it for a year but then switched to chemistry. From 1878 to 1880, he studied at Owens College, where Arthur Smithells was also working; the two were to become lifelong friends.

After an unhappy spell in industry at the Clayton Aniline Company, Cohen joined Smithells in moving to Baeyer's laboratory at the Ludwig-Maximilians-Universität München in 1882, where he worked with Hans von Pechmann. He remained there for two years and gained his PhD. Back in Manchester he was appointed as a Demonstrator in chemistry at Owens College. In 1890, he joined Smithells at Yorkshire College, Leeds; he had been there since 1885. When the college gained full university status in 1904, Cohen was appointed professor of organic chemistry. When he retired in 1924 he was made Emeritus Professor and the university awarded him the honorary degree of D. Sc.

Cohen was elected a Fellow of the Chemical Society in 1885, served on its Council from 1920 to 1922 and from 1925 to 1928, in which time he was also a Vice-President. In 1911, he was elected a Fellow of the Royal Society. In 1930 Cohen received the honorary degree of LLD from the University of Glasgow.

=== Family ===
Julius Cohen married Hilda Hughes in 1892. Over the next nine years they had two sons and two daughters; all were born in Leeds, and all studied at its University. Their elder son, Adolph Broadfield, was killed in action in 1917, aged 24.

The close connections between the Cohens and the Smithells was reflected in marriages. Julius's sister Amy married Edwin Smithells, brother of Arthur. They had a son, Colin James, who married Mary Cohen, the elder daughter of Julius and Hilda, in 1918.

In 1932, Julius and Hilda moved to Thwaite Cottage, Coniston. Julius died there on 14 June 1935. He was buried at St Andrew, Coniston. Hilda died on 21 November 1944, and was buried in the same grave.

== Works ==
- The Owens College Course of Practical Organic Chemistry, Macmillan & Co, 1887
- Theoretical organic chemistry, Macmillan and Co Ltd, 1902
- Practical organic chemistry for advanced students, Macmillan, 1907
- Smoke. A study of town air, Edward Arnold, 1912
- A Class-Book of Organic Chemistry, Macmillan & Co, 1917
