= Dakin oxidation =

Organic redox reaction

Dakin reaction
Named after	Henry Drysdale Dakin
Reaction type	Organic redox reaction

Identifiers
Organic Chemistry Portal	dakin-reaction
RSC ontology ID	RXNO:0000169

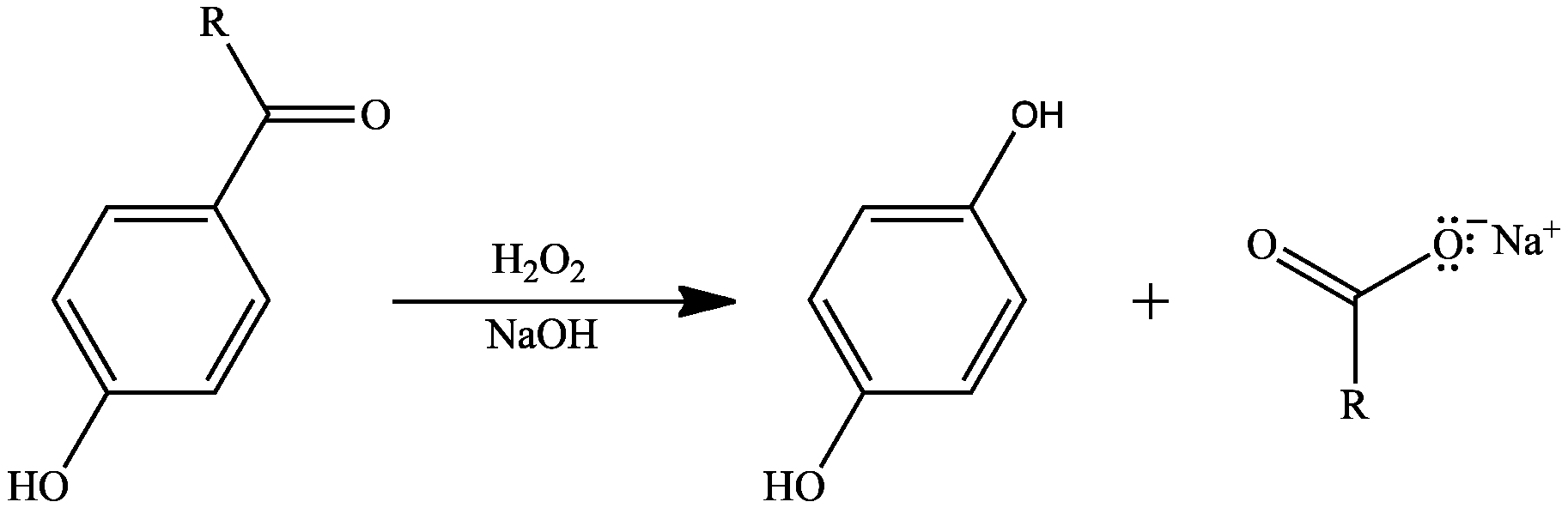
The Dakin oxidation

The Dakin oxidation (or Dakin reaction) is an organic redox reaction in which an ortho- or para-hydroxylated phenyl aldehyde (2-hydroxybenzaldehyde or 4-hydroxybenzaldehyde) or ketone reacts with hydrogen peroxide (H_{2}O_{2}) in base to form a benzenediol and a carboxylate. Overall, the carbonyl group is oxidised, whereas the H_{2}O_{2} is reduced.

The Dakin oxidation, which is closely related to the Baeyer–Villiger oxidation, is not to be confused with the Dakin–West reaction, though both are named after Henry Drysdale Dakin.

== Reaction mechanism ==
The Dakin oxidation starts with (1) nucleophilic addition of a hydroperoxide ion to the carbonyl carbon, forming a (2) tetrahedral intermediate. The intermediate collapses, causing [1,2]-aryl migration, hydroxide elimination, and formation of a (3) phenyl ester. The phenyl ester is subsequently hydrolyzed: nucleophilic addition of hydroxide ion from solution to the ester carbonyl carbon forms a (4) second tetrahedral intermediate, which collapses, eliminating a (5) phenoxide ion and forming a carboxylic acid. Finally, the phenoxide extracts the acidic hydrogen from the carboxylic acid, yielding the (6) collected products.

== Factors affecting reaction kinetics ==
The Dakin oxidation has two rate-limiting steps: nucleophilic addition of hydroperoxide to the carbonyl carbon and [1,2]-aryl migration. Therefore, the overall rate of oxidation is dependent on the nucleophilicity of hydroperoxide, the electrophilicity of the carbonyl carbon, and the speed of [1,2]-aryl migration. The alkyl substituents on the carbonyl carbon, the relative positions of the hydroxyl and carbonyl groups on the aryl ring, the presence of other functional groups on the ring, and the reaction mixture pH are four factors that affect these rate-limiting steps.

=== Alkyl substituents ===
In general, phenyl aldehydes are more reactive than phenyl ketones because the ketone carbonyl carbon is less electrophilic than the aldehyde carbonyl carbon. The difference can be mitigated by increasing the temperature of the reaction mixture.

=== Relative positions of hydroxyl and carbonyl groups ===
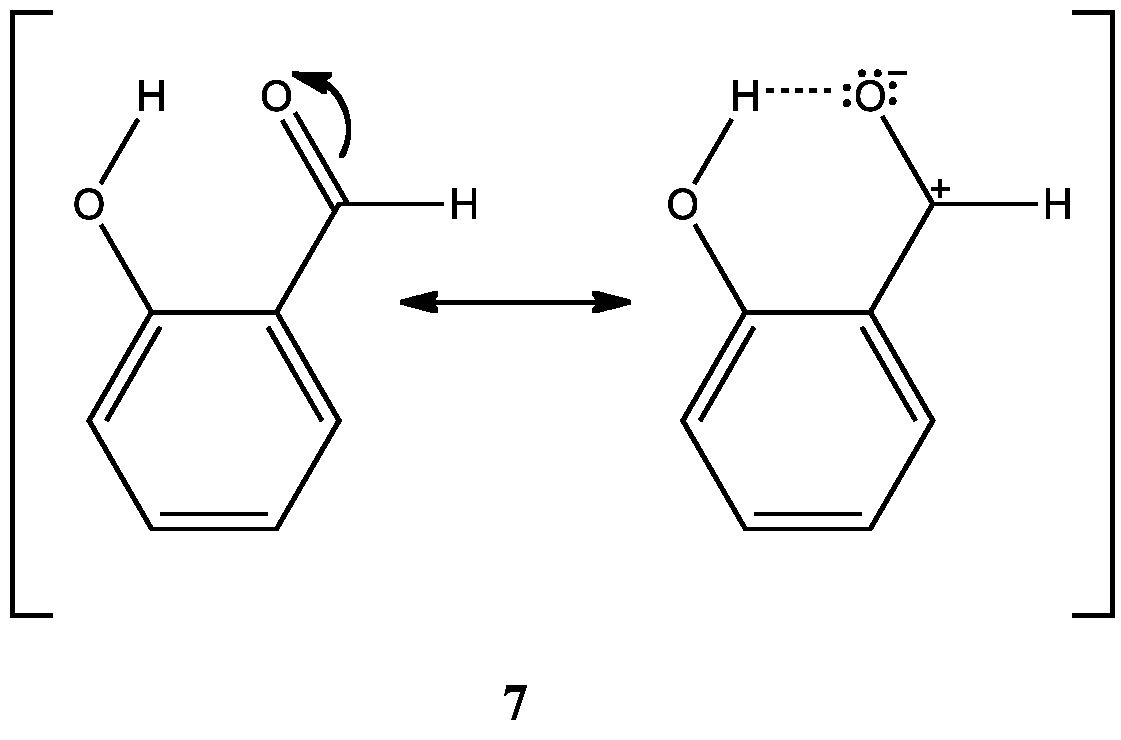
Hydrogen bond in ortho substrate

O-hydroxy phenyl aldehydes and ketones oxidize faster than p-hydroxy phenyl aldehydes and ketones in weakly basic conditions. In o-hydroxy compounds, when the hydroxyl group is protonated, an intramolecular hydrogen bond can form between the hydroxyl hydrogen and the carbonyl oxygen, stabilizing a resonance structure with positive charge on the carbonyl carbon, thus increasing the carbonyl carbon's electrophilicity (7). Lacking this stabilization, the carbonyl carbon of p-hydroxy compounds is less electrophilic. Therefore, o-hydroxy compounds are oxidized faster than p-hydroxy compounds when the hydroxyl group is protonated.

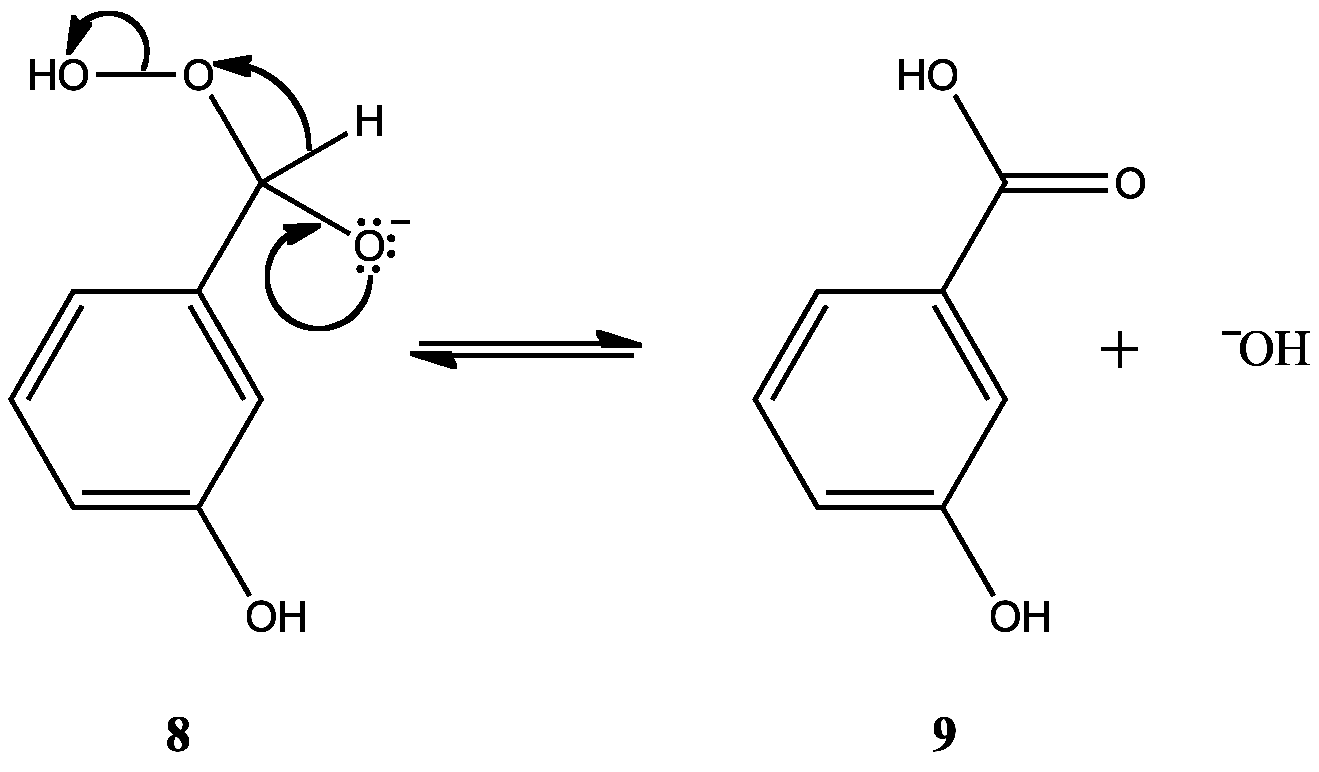
Carboxylic acid product formation

M-hydroxy compounds do not oxidize to m-benzenediols and carboxylates. Rather, they form phenyl carboxylic acids. Variations in the aryl rings' migratory aptitudes can explain this. Hydroxyl groups ortho or para to the carbonyl group concentrate electron density at the aryl carbon bonded to the carbonyl carbon (10c, 11d). Phenyl groups have low migratory aptitude, but higher electron density at the migrating carbon increases migratory aptitude, facilitating [1,2]-aryl migration and allowing the reaction to continue. M-hydroxy compounds do not concentrate electron density at the migrating carbon (12a, 12b, 12c, 12d); their aryl groups' migratory aptitude remains low. The benzylic hydrogen, which has the highest migratory aptitude, migrates instead (8), forming a phenyl carboxylic acid (9).

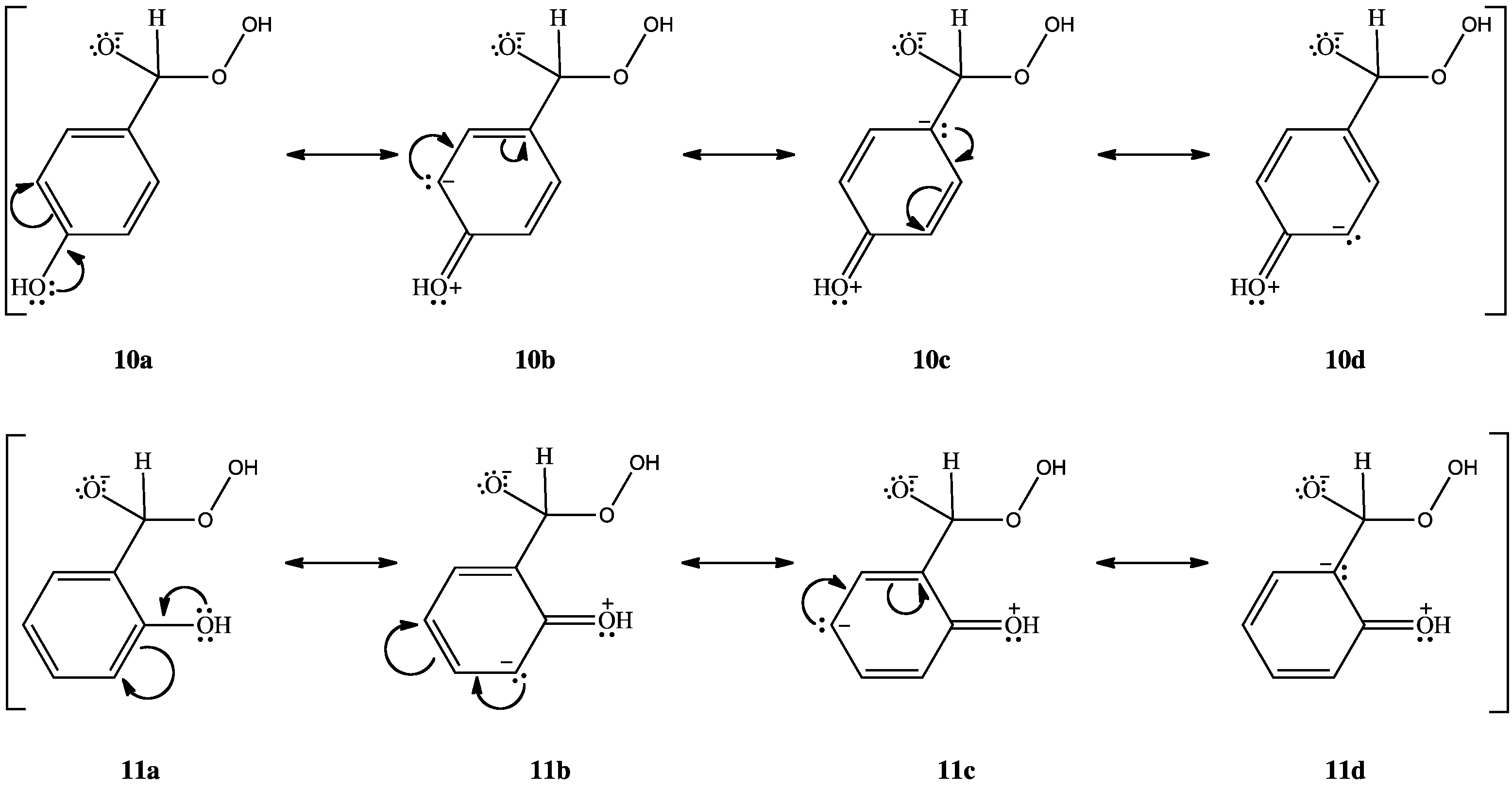
Concentration of electron density at the migrating carbon with para (top) and ortho (bottom) hydroxyl group

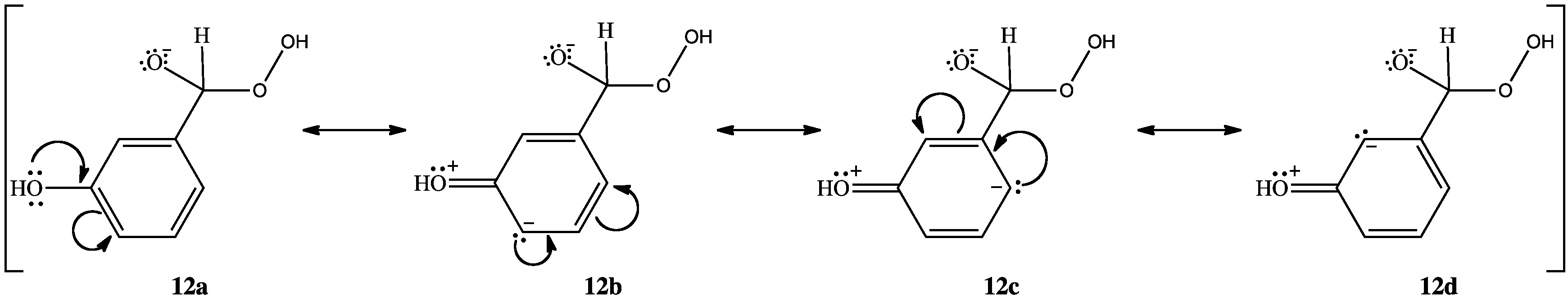
Lack of electron density concentration at the migrating carbon with meta hydroxyl group

=== Other functional groups on the aryl ring ===
Substitution of phenyl hydrogens with electron-donating groups ortho or para to the carbonyl group increases electron density at the migrating carbon, promotes [1,2]-aryl migration, and accelerates oxidation. Substitution with electron-donating groups meta to the carbonyl group does not change electron density at the migrating carbon; because unsubstituted phenyl group migratory aptitude is low, hydrogen migration dominates. Substitution with electron-withdrawing groups ortho or para to the carbonyl decreases electron density at the migrating carbon (13c), inhibits [1,2]-aryl migration, and favors hydrogen migration.

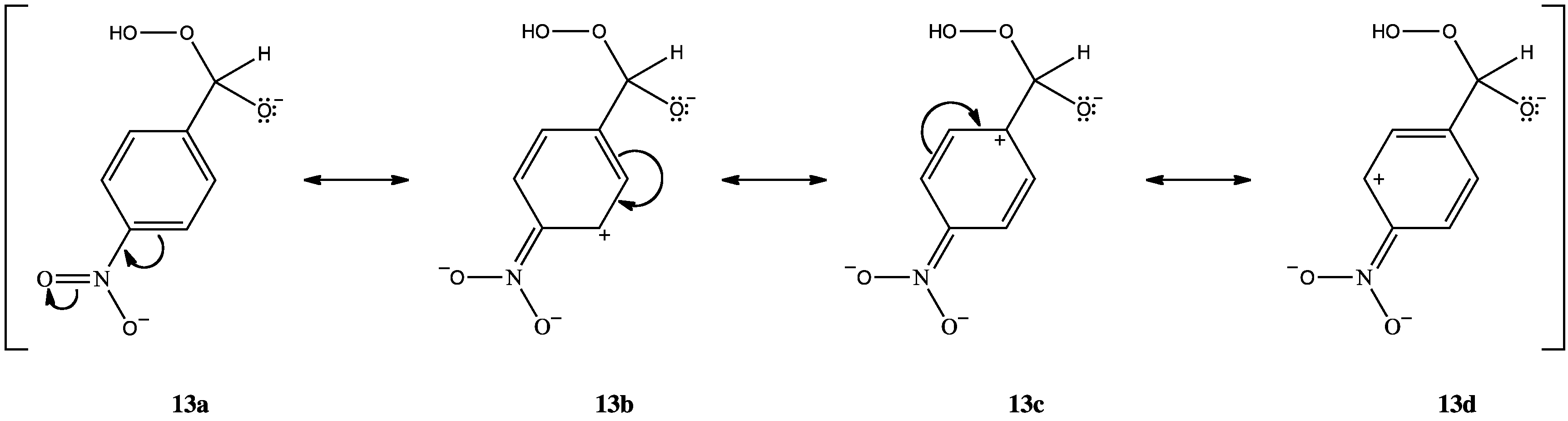
Concentration of positive charge at migrating carbon with para nitro group

=== pH ===
The hydroperoxide anion is a more reactive nucleophile than neutral hydrogen peroxide. Consequently, oxidation accelerates as pH increases toward the pK_{a} of hydrogen peroxide and hydroperoxide concentration climbs. At pH higher than 13.5, however, oxidation does not occur, possibly due to deprotonation of the second peroxidic oxygen. Deprotonation of the second peroxidic oxygen would prevent [1,2]-aryl migration because the lone oxide anion is too basic to be eliminated (2).

Deprotonation of the hydroxyl group increases electron donation from the hydroxyl oxygen. When the hydroxyl group is ortho or para to the carbonyl group, deprotonation increases the electron density at the migrating carbon, promoting faster [1,2]-aryl migration. Therefore, [1,2]-aryl migration is facilitated by the pH range that favors deprotonated over protonated hydroxyl group.

== Variants ==
=== Acid-catalyzed Dakin oxidation ===
The Dakin oxidation can occur in mild acidic conditions as well, with a mechanism analogous to the base-catalyzed mechanism. In methanol, hydrogen peroxide, and catalytic sulfuric acid, the carbonyl oxygen is protonated (14), after which hydrogen peroxide adds as a nucleophile to the carbonyl carbon, forming a tetrahedral intermediate (15). Following an intramolecular proton transfer (16,17), the tetrahedral intermediate collapses, [1,2]-aryl migration occurs, and water is eliminated (18). Nucleophilic addition of methanol to the carbonyl carbon forms another tetrahedral intermediate (19). Following a second intramolecular proton transfer (20,21), the tetrahedral intermediate collapses, eliminating a phenol and forming an ester protonated at the carbonyl oxygen (22). Finally, deprotonation of the carbonyl oxygen yields the collected products and regenerates the acid catalyst (23).

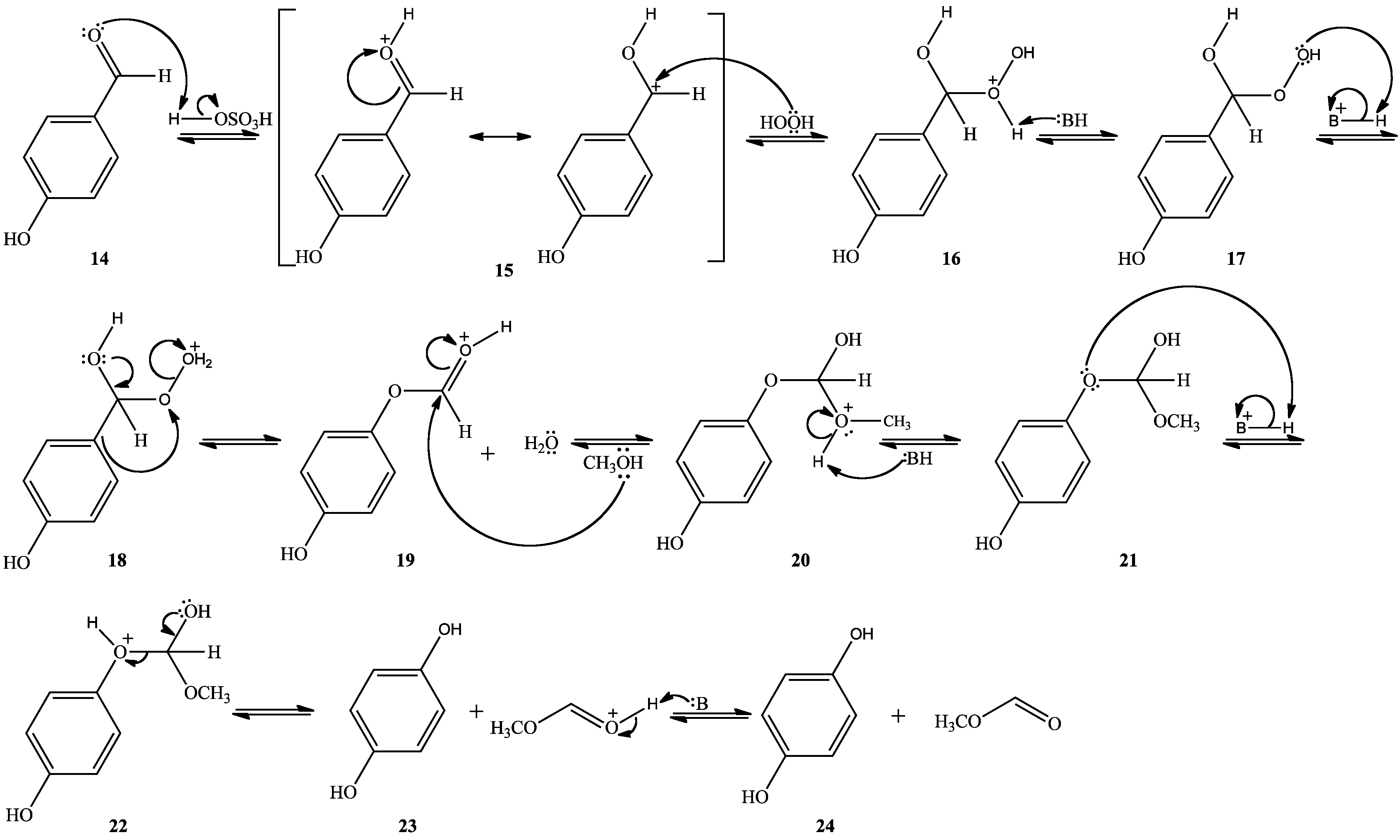
Acid-catalyzed Dakin oxidation mechanism

=== Boric acid-catalyzed Dakin oxidation ===
Adding boric acid to the acid-catalyzed reaction mixture increases the yield of phenol product over phenyl carboxylic acid product, even when using phenyl aldehyde or ketone reactants with electron-donating groups meta to the carbonyl group or electron-withdrawing groups ortho or para to the carbonyl group. Boric acid and hydrogen peroxide form a complex in solution that, once added to the carbonyl carbon, favors aryl migration over hydrogen migration, maximizing the yield of phenol and reducing the yield of phenyl carboxylic acid.

=== Methyltrioxorhenium-catalyzed Dakin oxidation ===
Using an ionic liquid solvent with catalytic methyltrioxorhenium (MTO) dramatically accelerates Dakin oxidation. MTO forms a complex with hydrogen peroxide that increases the rate of addition of hydrogen peroxide to the carbonyl carbon. MTO does not, however, change the relative yields of phenol and phenyl carboxylic acid products.

=== Urea-catalyzed Dakin oxidation ===
Mixing urea and hydrogen peroxide yields urea-hydrogen peroxide complex (UHC). Adding dry UHC to solventless phenyl aldehyde or ketone also accelerates Dakin oxidation. Like MTO, UHP increases the rate of nucleophilic addition of hydrogen peroxide. But unlike the MTO-catalyzed variant, the urea-catalyzed variant does not produce potentially toxic heavy metal waste; it has also been applied to the synthesis of amine oxides such as pyridine-N-oxide.

== Synthetic applications ==
The Dakin oxidation is most commonly used to synthesize benzenediols and alkoxyphenols. Catechol, for example, is synthesized from o-hydroxy and o-alkoxy phenyl aldehydes and ketones, and is used as the starting material for synthesis of several compounds, including the catecholamines, catecholamine derivatives, and 4-tert-butylcatechol, a common antioxidant and polymerization inhibitor. Other synthetically useful products of the Dakin oxidation include guaiacol, a precursor of several flavorants; hydroquinone, a common photograph-developing agent; and 2-tert-butyl-4-hydroxyanisole and 3-tert-butyl-4-hydroxyanisole, two antioxidants commonly used to preserve packaged food. In addition, the Dakin oxidation is useful in the synthesis of indolequinones, naturally occurring compounds that exhibit high anti-biotic, anti-fungal, and anti-tumor activities.

== See also ==
- Baeyer–Villiger oxidation
- Beckmann rearrangement
- Reimer–Tiemann reaction
