= Dakin's solution =

Dilute solution used as an antiseptic

Dakin's solution is a dilute solution of sodium hypochlorite (0.4% to 0.5%) and other stabilizing ingredients, traditionally used as an antiseptic, e.g. to cleanse wounds in order to prevent infection. The preparation was for a time called also Carrel–Dakin solution or Carrel–Dakin fluid.

== Use ==
Carrel and Dakin used a variety of apparatuses to infuse the solution continuously over the wounds. In modern typical usage, the solution is applied to the wound once daily for lightly to moderately exudative wounds, and twice daily for heavily exudative wounds or highly contaminated wounds.

The healthy skin surrounding the wound should preferably be protected with a moisture barrier ointment (e.g., petroleum jelly) or skin sealant as needed to prevent irritation.

== History ==
The solution takes the name from British chemist Henry Drysdale Dakin (1880–1952) who developed it in 1916, during World War I, while he was stationed at a field hospital in Compiègne. He worked there in collaboration with French physician Alexis Carrel, and the particular use they made of the solution is known as the Carrel–Dakin method for wound treatment.

Sodium hypochlorite solution had been developed as a bleaching agent around 1820 by the French chemist Antoine Labarraque, as a cheaper substitute for Claude Berthollet's potassium hypochlorite solution, produced as Eau de Javel since the late 18th century. Around that time, he also discovered the disinfectant properties of his Eau de Labarraque, which was quickly adopted for that purpose. His work greatly improved medical practice, public health, and the sanitary conditions in hospitals, slaughterhouses, and all industries dealing with animal products. However, those products were too concentrated and alkaline for use on wounds, as they strongly irritated healthy tissues.

Almost a century later Carrel and Dakin observed that few doctors at the time practiced asepsis, and moreover there were no studies of the effectiveness of various antiseptics for wounds. They set out to look for a substance that did not irritate skin, yet had sufficient bactericidal power. Dakin tested more than 200 substances, measuring their action on tissues and bacteria. He found chloramines to be the best, for being stable, non-toxic, and not very irritating, yet powerful bactericides, presumably due to their release of hypochlorous acid. However, the difficulty of procuring them led him to choose "hypochlorite of soda" as a practical alternative.

Between the two World Wars, the preparation was often called "Carrel–Dakin solution," even though Dakin did the bulk of the research work that led to its formulation. The name of Carrel was dropped after World War II, presumably due to his active involvement in eugenics movements and the advocacy of elimination of "inferior" humans.

Since penicillin became established as an antibiotic in 1943, use of Dakin's solution and other topical antiseptics for wound treatment has declined, and their use is frowned upon in modern medical care. However, the solution continues to be used (as of 2023) due to its broad activity against aerobic and anaerobic organisms, including fungi and antibiotic-resistant organisms, its very low cost, and its wide availability. In emergency situations, it can be produced on the field from liquid bleach and sodium bicarbonate.

== Formulation ==
Dakin's original solution contained sodium hypochlorite (0.4% to 0.5%), prepared by treating calcium hypochlorite with sodium carbonate ("washing soda"). The solution left after removal of the insoluble calcium carbonate still contained some soda. Boric acid (4%) was then added as a buffering agent to maintain a pH of between 9 and 10. Dakin found that alkalinity outside this range was too irritating. The solution, while unstable, remains effective for at least a week, if made to the correct pH.

Other formulations have been developed over time. In 1916, Marcel Daufresne substituted sodium bicarbonate for Dakin's boric acid as buffering agent. This formulation is the basis of current commercial products.

The concentration chosen by Dakin (0.5%) was the maximum highest concentration found tolerable to the skin. It is the concentration recommended by the U.S. Centers for Disease Control (CDC) as a household disinfectant. In one study, bactericidal effects of sodium hypochlorite solution were observed at concentrations as low as 0.025%, without any tissue toxicity in vivo or in vitro. It recommended that concentration be adopted as a "modified Dakin's solution" for wound dressing. Currently, various concentrations are sold for wound cleansing including Anasept (0.057%), 1/4 strength Dakin's (0.125%), and Di-Dak-Sol or Dakin's Wound Cleanser (0.0125%) which is 1/40 strength.

== See also ==
- Chlorine-releasing compound
- Hydrogen peroxide
- Povidone-iodine
- Phenol ("carbolic acid")
- Eusol
