= Antoine Germain Labarraque =

French chemist and pharmacist (1777–1850)

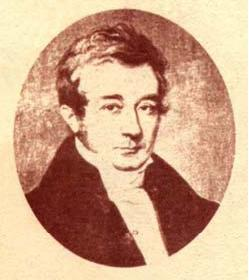
- Portrait of Labarraque
- Born: 28 March 1777; Oloron-Sainte-Marie, Pyrénées-Atlantiques, France
- Died: 9 December 1850 (aged 73) near Paris, France
- Education: College of Pharmacy, Paris
- Occupations: chemist and pharmacist
- Known for: using sodium hypochlorite as a disinfectant and deodoriser
- Parents: François Labarraque (father); Christine Sousbielle (mother)

Antoine Germain Labarraque (28 March 1777 – 9 December 1850) was a French chemist and pharmacist, notable for formulating and finding important uses for "Eau de Labarraque" or "Labarraque's solution", a solution of sodium hypochlorite widely used as a disinfectant and deodoriser.

Labarraque's use of sodium and calcium hypochlorite solutions in the disinfection of animal gut processing facilities and morgues, as well as his published reports of their application to treat gangrene and putrescent wounds in living persons in the 1820s, established this practice long before Ignaz Semmelweis employed the same solutions to prevent "cadaveric particles" from traveling from hospital dissecting rooms to patient examination rooms, starting in 1847. These findings and practices are notable for providing an empirical discovery of antisepsis, starting some 40 years before Pasteur and Lister began to establish the theoretical basis of this practice.

Labarraque's solutions and techniques remain in use to the present day.

== Life and work ==
=== Early years and career ===
Labarraque was born in Oloron-Sainte-Marie, in the Pyrénées-Atlantiques department, on 28 March 1777, the son of François Labarraque and Christine Sousbielle. He spent over 2 years as a pupil of a pharmacist called Préville in Orthez, but was then drafted into the army as a "Grenadier de la Tour d'Auvergne". He was promoted to battlefield seargent, and eventually became pharmacist-in-chief at the military hospital of Berra. He contracted Typhus and after his recovery was discharged from the military in 1795.

Having taken a liking to Pharmacy, he went to Montpellier to study under Jean-Antoine Chaptal. He then went to Paris, where he worked as a pharmacist and studied at the "College of Pharmacy" under various teachers including Louis Nicolas Vauquelin. He qualified as a master of Pharmacy in 1805, and in the same year published a work, "Sur la dissolution du phosphore" (on the dissolution of Phosphorus) followed by "Sur les electuaires" (On electuaries). He became a member of the "Sociétés de pharmacie et de médecine" in 1809 after presenting a paper, "Sur les teintures alcooliques et quelques expériences sur la teinture alcoolique de benjoin" (Alcoholic tinctures and some experiments on the alcoholic tincture of Benzoin). Subsequently, Labarraque took part in several commissions to examine presentations made to the society.

=== "Labarraque's solution" ===
In France (as elsewhere) there was a need to process animal guts in order to make musical instrument strings, Goldbeater's skin and other products. This was carried out in premises known as "boyauderies" (gut factories) and was a notoriously dirty, smelly and unhealthy business. In or about 1820, the Société d'Encouragement pour l'Industrie nationale offered a prize for the discovery of a method, chemical or mechanical, which could be used to separate the peritoneal membrane of animal intestines without causing putrefaction.

Labarraque experimented with different compositions, finding that a solution of "chloride of lime" (calcium hypochlorite) had better anti-putrid properties than the already-known "Eau de Javel" (dilute water solution of sodium hypochlorite, first produced for bleaching purposes by Claude Berthollet in 1789), but caused slower detachment of the gut mucous membrane. He therefore preferred Eau de Javel, which also had the advantage of being cheaper than chlorinated solutions based on potassium salts. Labarreque won the society's prize of 1,500 francs, by showing how a number of these solutions that were made from free chlorine and later gave rise to it, could be employed both to fumigate the workshops, and to loosen the membranes one from another without allowing the offensive odour to escape. He freely acknowledged the part that his predecessors, such as Berthollet (1748–1822), had played in his discovery.

=== Invention of antisepsis techniques with chlorine ===
In 1824, Labarraque was called in to assist after the death of King Louis XVIII, who had died of extensive gangrene. The putrefied body emitting a foul odour long before death, which the chemist was able to remove by covering the body with a sheet soaked in chlorinated water. He was awarded the Prix Montyon, in 1825, by the "Académie des Sciences", and, in 1826, a medal by the Académie de Marseille, for his work on "the application of chlorides to hygiene and therapeutics". He was made a member of the "Académie de Médecine" (1824), Légion d'Honneur (1827) and the "Conseil de Salubrité" (council of health, 1836).

Labarraque's research resulted in chlorides and hypochlorites of lime (calcium hypochlorite) and of sodium (sodium hypochlorite) being employed not only in the boyauderies but also for the routine disinfection and deodorisation of latrines, sewers, markets, abattoirs, anatomical theatres and morgues. They were also used, with success, in hospitals, lazarets, prisons, infirmaries (both on land and at sea), magnaneries, stables, cattle-sheds, etc.; and for exhumations, embalming, during outbreaks of epidemic illness, fever, Blackleg (disease) in cattle, etc.

Labarraque's chlorinated lime and soda solutions had been advocated in 1828 to prevent infection (called "contagious infection", and presumed to be transmitted by "miasmas") and also to treat putrefaction of existing wounds, including septic wounds. In this 1828 work, Labarraque recommended for the doctor to breathe chlorine, wash his hands with chlorinated lime, and even sprinkle chlorinated lime about the patient's bed, in cases of "contagious infection."

During the Paris cholera outbreak of 1832, large quantities of so-called chloride of lime were used to disinfect the capital. This was not simply modern calcium chloride, but contained chlorine gas dissolved in lime-water (dilute calcium hydroxide) to form calcium hypochlorite (chlorinated lime). Labarraque's discovery helped to remove the terrible stench of decay from hospitals and dissecting rooms, and, by doing so, effectively deodorised the Latin Quarter of Paris. These "putrid miasmas" were thought by many to be responsible for the spread of "contagion" and "infection"- both words used before the germ theory of infection.

Perhaps the most famous application of Labarraque's chlorine and chemical base solutions was in 1847, when Ignaz Semmelweis used (first) chlorine-water, then cheaper chlorinated lime solutions, to deodorize the hands of Austrian doctors that Semmelweis noticed still carried the stench of decomposition from the dissection rooms to the patient examination rooms. Semmelweis, still long before the germ theory of disease, had theorized that "cadaveric particles" were somehow transmitting decay from fresh cadavers to living patients, and he used the well-known Labarraque's solutions as the only known method to remove the smell of decay and tissue decomposition (which he found that soap did not). Coincidentally the solutions proved to be far more effective germicides and antiseptics than soap (Semmelweis only knew that soap was less effective, but not why), and the success of these chlorinated agents resulted in Semmelweis's (later) celebrated success in stopping the transmission of childbed fever.

Long after the illustrious chemist's death, during the Custer campaigns in North Dakota (1873–1874), chief-surgeon, Dr. Henry H Ruger (known as "Big Medicine Man" by the Indians) used "Eau de Labarraque" to prevent further deterioration in cases of frostbite.

Much later, during World War I in 1916, a standardized and diluted modification of Labarraque's solution containing hypochlorite and boric acid was developed by Henry Drysdale Dakin. Called Dakin's solution, the method of wound irrigation with chlorinated solutions allowed antiseptic treatment of a wide variety of open wounds, long before the antibiotic era. A modified version of this solution is still employed in wound irrigation, where it continues to be effective against multiply-antibiotic resistant bacteria (see Century Pharmaceuticals).

=== Death ===
Antoine Germain Labarraque died near Paris on 9 December 1850.

== Other written works ==
- L'Art du boyauderie (Paris, 1822).
- De l'emploi des chlorures d'oxide de sodium et de chaux. (Paris, 1825).
- Scott, James (trans.). On the disinfecting properties of Labarraque's preparations of chlorine (S. Highley, 1828).
- Manière de se servir du chlorure d'oxyde de sodium soit pour panser les plaies de mauvaise nature, soit comme moyen d'assainissement des lieux insalubres et de désinfection des matières animales (Paris, 1825).
- Note sur une asphyxie produite par les émanations des materiaux retirés d'une fosse d'aisance; suivant d'Expériences sur les moyens de désinfection propres à prévenir de pareils accidents (Paris, 1825).
- Sur la préparation des chlorures désinfectants (Paris, 1826).
- Rapport au conseil de salubrité de Paris sur l'exhumation des cadavres déposés en juillet 1832 dans les caveaux de l'église Saint-Eustache.

Labarraque also wrote a large number of dissertations and reports which appeared in journals and scientific reviews.

== See also ==
- Thomas Alcock (surgeon)
- Henry Drysdale Dakin
- Charles Tennant
- Bleach
