= Dakin–West reaction =

Reaction that converts amino acids into a keto-amides

The Dakin–West reaction is a chemical reaction that transforms an amino-acid into a keto-amide using an acid anhydride and a base, typically pyridine. It is named for Henry Drysdale Dakin and Randolph West. In 2016 Schreiner and coworkers reported the first asymmetric variant of this reaction employing short oligopeptides as catalysts.

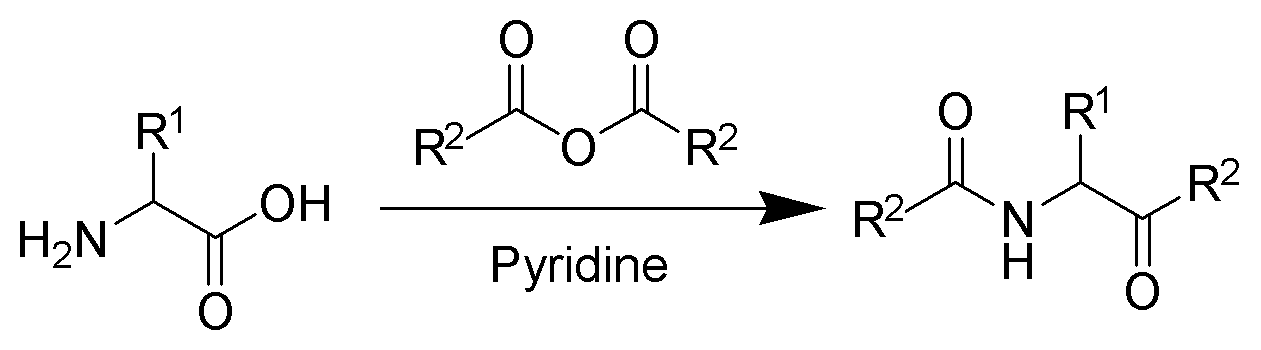
The Dakin–West reaction

With pyridine as a base and solvent, refluxing conditions are required. However, with the addition of 4-dimethylaminopyridine (DMAP) as a catalyst, the reaction can take place at room temperature.

With some acids, this reaction can take place even in the absence of an α-amino group.

This reaction should not be confused with the Dakin reaction.

== Reaction mechanism ==
The reaction mechanism involves the acylation and activation of the acid 1 to the mixed anhydride 3. The amide will serve as a nucleophile for the cyclization forming the azlactone 4. Deprotonation and acylation of the azlactone forms the key carbon-carbon bond. Subsequent ring-opening of 6 and decarboxylation give the final keto-amide product.

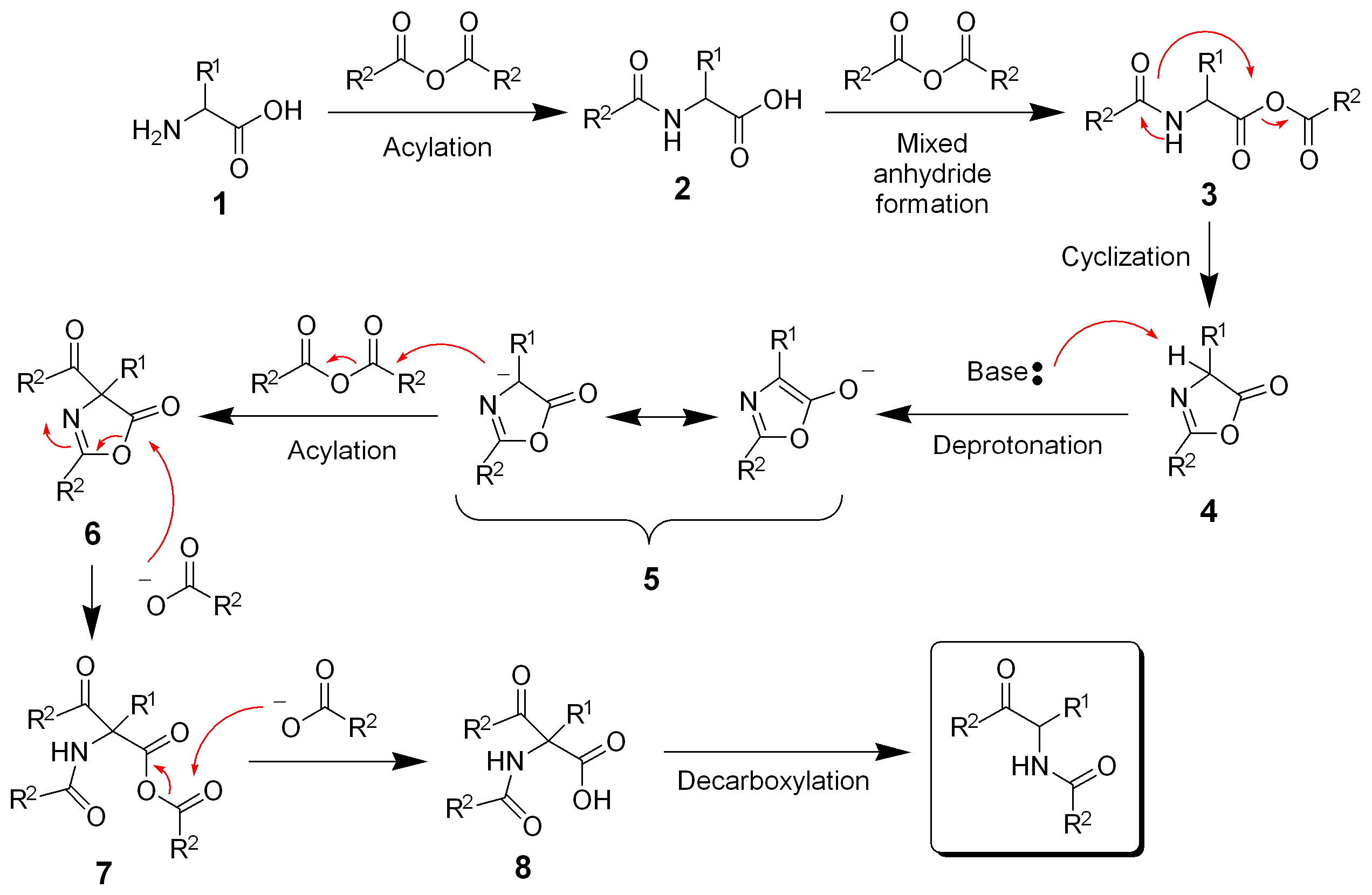
The mechanism of the Dakin-West reaction

== General ketone synthesis ==
Modern variations on the Dakin–West reaction permit many enolizable carboxylic acids – not merely amino acids – to be converted to their corresponding methyl ketones. For example, β-aryl carboxylic acids can be efficiently converted to β-aryl ketones by treatment of an acetic anhydride solution of the acid with catalytic N-methylimidazole. This reactivity is attributed in part to generation of acetylimidazolium, a powerful cationic acetylating agent, in situ.

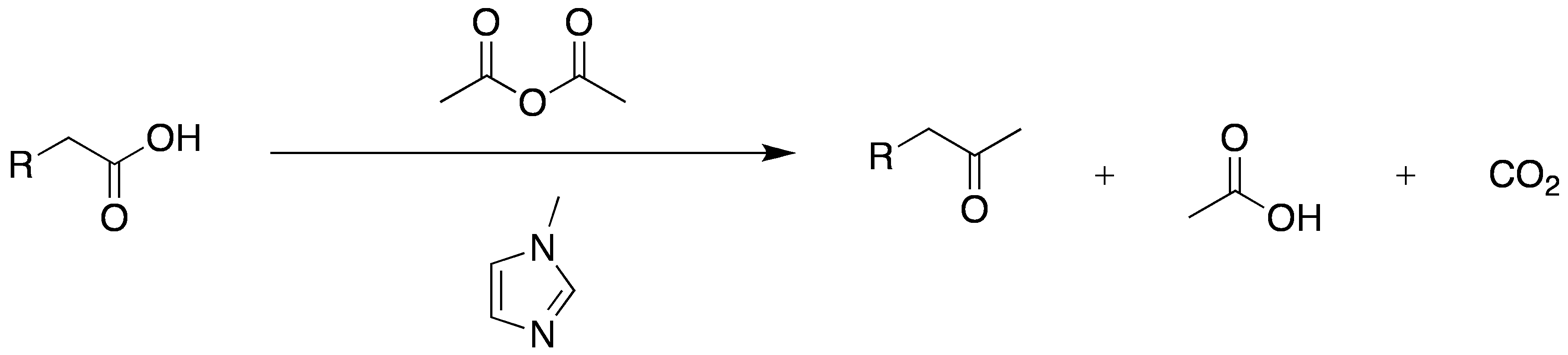
Modified Dakin-West reaction

== See also ==
- Robinson–Gabriel synthesis - A process for converting the keto-amide products of this reaction into oxazoles
