= Henry Drysdale Dakin =

British chemist (1880–1952)

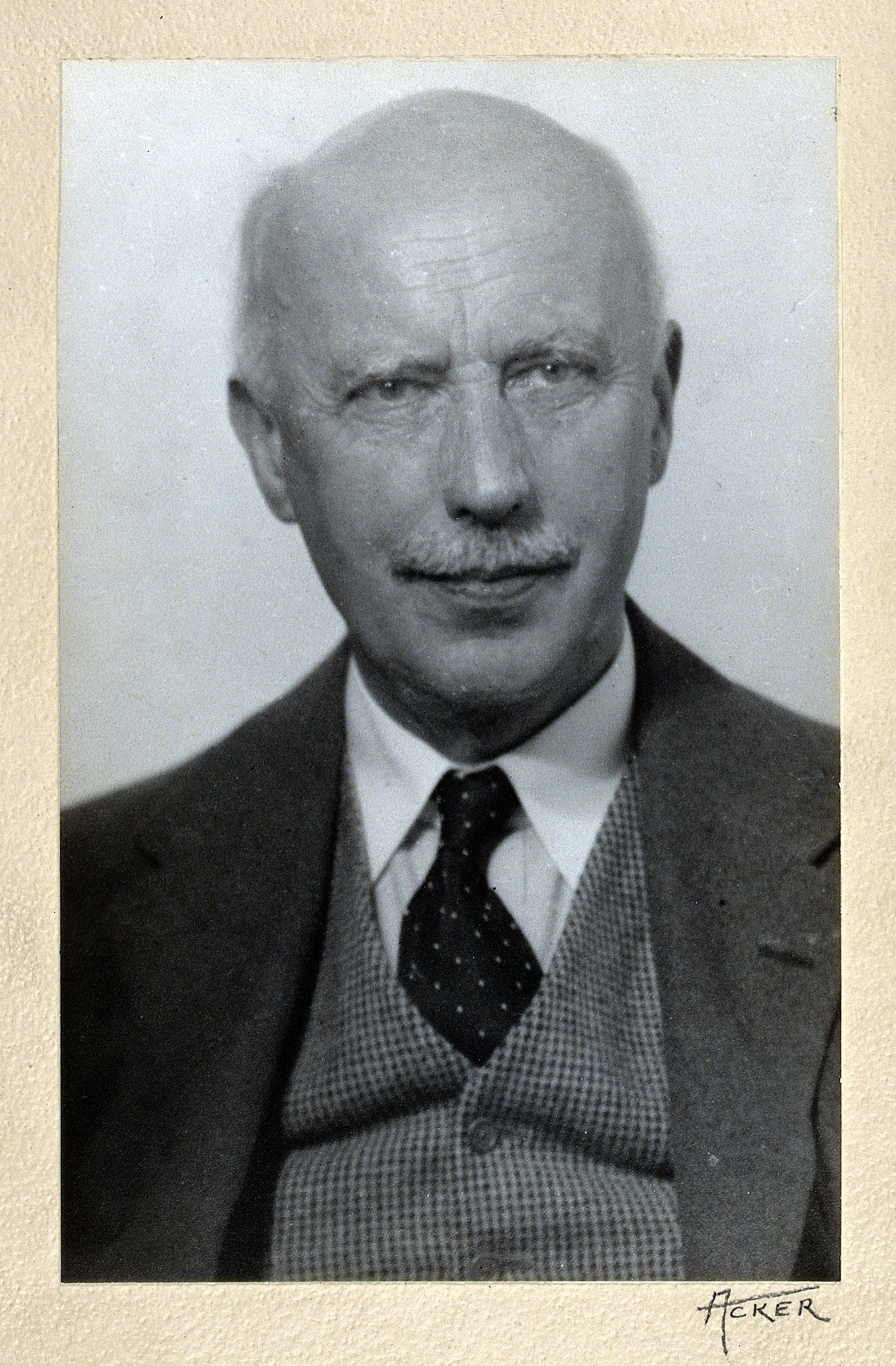
- Portrait. Credit:Wellcome Science Museum Group
- Born: 12 March 1880; London, England
- Died: 10 February 1952 (aged 71); Scarsdale, New York, United States
- Education: University of Leeds
- Known for: Carrel-Dakin method Dakin reaction Dakin–West reaction
- Awards: Davy Medal (1941); Fellow of the Royal Society (1917)
- Scientific career
- Workplaces: University of Leeds, University of Heidelberg, Columbia University
- Doctoral advisor: Julius B. Cohen, Albrecht Kossel

Henry Drysdale Dakin FRS (12 March 1880 – 10 February 1952) was an English chemist.

He was born in London as the youngest of 8 children to a family of steel merchants from Leeds. As a school boy, he conducted water analysis with the Leeds City Analyst. He was taught chemistry by Julius B. Cohen at the University of Leeds, and then he worked with Albrecht Kossel on arginase at the University of Heidelberg. He joined Columbia University in 1905, working in the lab of Christian Herter. During his work on amino acids he obtained his PhD from Leeds. In 1905, he was one of the first scientists to successfully synthesise adrenaline in the laboratory (see: History of catecholamine research).

In 1914 he went back to England to offer his service with the war effort. Due to a request for a chemist by Alexis Carrel to the Rockefeller Institute, Dakin joined Carrel in 1916 at a temporary hospital in Compiègne. There they developed the Carrel–Dakin method of wound treatments. This consisted of intermittently irrigating the wound with Dakin's solution, a dilute solution of sodium hypochlorite (the active ingredient in common liquid bleach products) and boric acid. In the process, he analyzed more than 200 candidate substances, and developed quantitative methods to evaluate their effectiveness for disinfection and wound healing. The solution is still widely used for that purpose, as of 2013. The World War I era Rockefeller War Demonstration Hospital (United States Army Auxiliary Hospital No. 1) was created, in part, to promote the Carrel–Dakin method:

"The war demonstration hospital of the Rockefeller Institute was planned as a school in which to teach military surgeons the principles of and art of applying the Carrel-Dakin treatment."

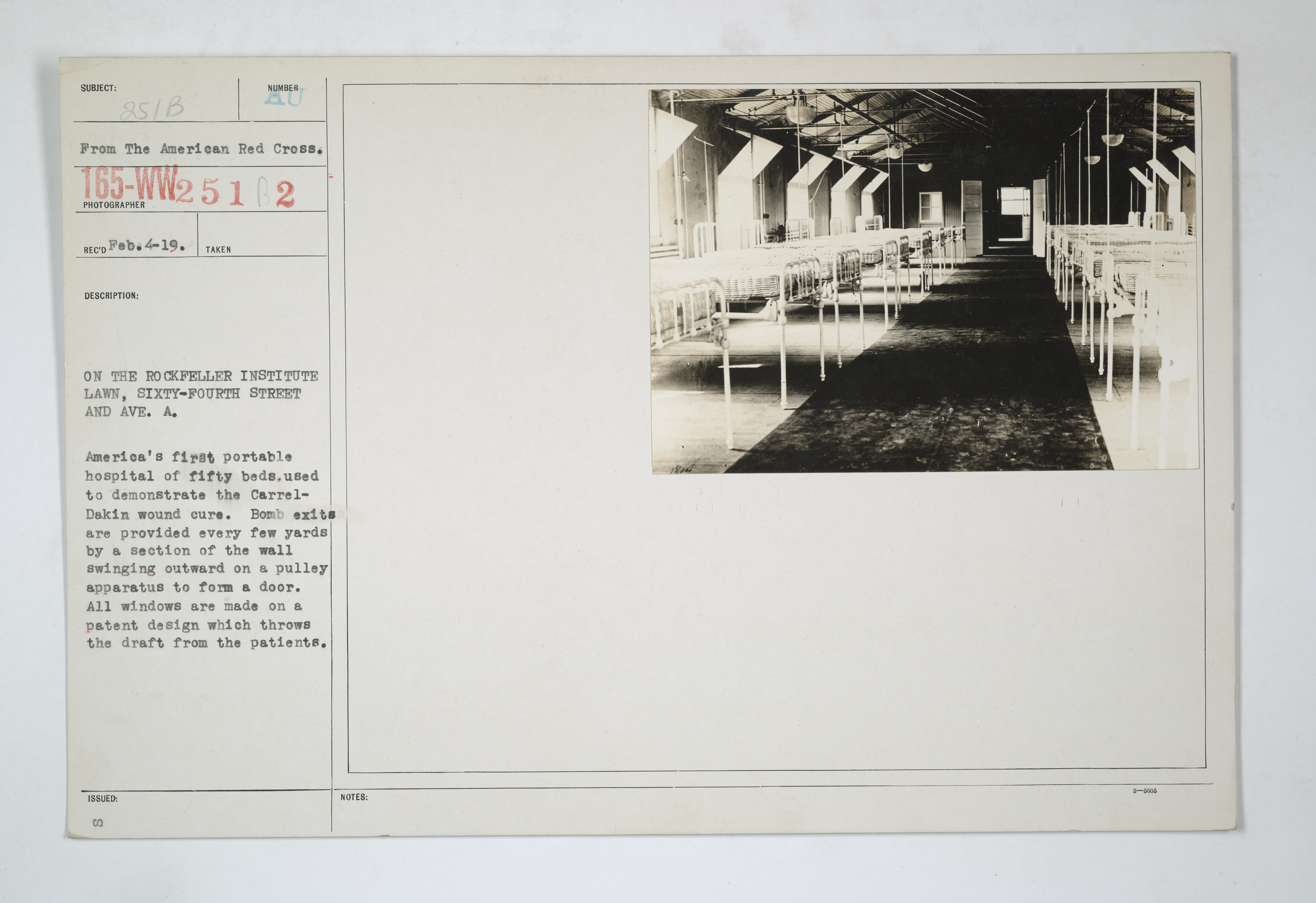
Photograph of a ward of the Rockefeller War Demonstration Hospital.

After he married the widow of Christian Herter in 1916, he worked in his private laboratory in Scarsdale, New York and had several close collaborations with other scientists. His main working fields were amino acids and enzymes. The extraction of amino acids from hydrolyzed peptides by butanol was invented by him. He also was interested in organic chemistry and synthesis, and devised the Dakin reaction and the Dakin–West reaction.

He died shortly after the death of his wife in early 1952.
