= Peroxide-based bleach =

Household bleach product

A peroxide-based bleach, or simply peroxide bleach — more commonly referred to as oxygen bleach or erroneously, oxygenated bleach (sometimes abbreviated as "Oxy" or "Oxi") — is any bleach product that is based on the peroxide chemical group, namely two oxygen atoms connected by a single bond, (–O–O–). This bond is fairly weak and is often broken in chemical reactions of peroxides, giving rise to very reactive oxygen species, which are the active agents of the bleach.

Peroxide-based bleaches became common household products in the late 20th century, being the base of many laundry detergent formulations. Most of these products are adducts of hydrogen peroxide (H_{2}O_{2} or HOOH), that is, solids that contain H_{2}O_{2} trapped in a crystal structure together with another material like sodium carbonate or urea. An exception is sodium perborate, which has a cyclic structure containing two O-O single bonds.

Peroxide bleaches are considered to be eco-friendly cleaning agents, compared to chlorine-based bleaches that might produce organochlorine compounds.

== Chemistry ==
All peroxide-based bleaches release hydrogen peroxide when dissolved in water. Peroxide bleaches are often used along with bleach activators, such as tetraacetylethylenediamine (TAED) or sodium nonanoyloxybenzenesulfonate (NOBS).

== Products ==
The main products in this class are

- Hydrogen peroxide itself (H_{2}O_{2}). It is used, for example, to bleach wood pulp and hair or to prepare other bleaching agents like the perborates, percarbonates, peracids, etc.
- Sodium percarbonate (Na_{2}H_{3}CO_{6}), an adduct of hydrogen peroxide and sodium carbonate ("soda ash" or "washing soda", Na_{2}CO_{3}). Dissolved in water, it yields a solution of the two products, that combines the degreasing action of the carbonate with the bleaching action of the peroxide.
- Sodium perborate (Na_{2}H_{4}B_{2}O_{8}). Dissolved in water it forms some hydrogen peroxide, but also the perborate anion (B(OOH)(OH)^{−}_{3})which is activated for nucleophilic oxidation.

== See also ==
- Chlorine-based bleach
- Ozone
