= Claude Louis Berthollet =

French chemist (1748–1822)

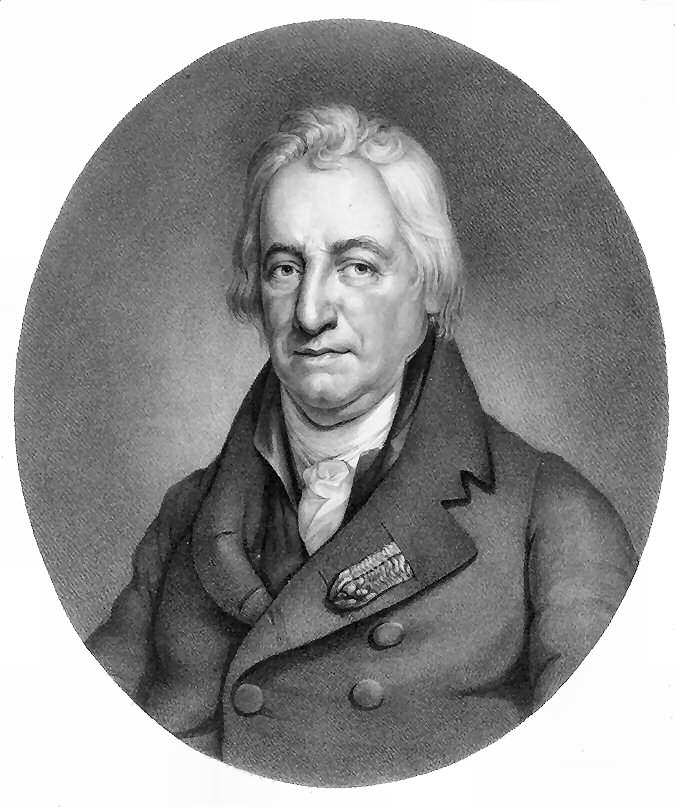
- Born: 9 December 1748; Talloires, Duchy of Savoy, Kingdom of Sardinia
- Died: 6 November 1822 (aged 73); Arcueil, France
- Citizenship: Savoyard-French
- Education: Chambéry, Turin
- Known for: Berthollides; Berthollet's salt Chemical affinity Chemical equilibrium Reversible reaction Silver nitride Sodium hypochlorite
- Awards: ForMemRS (1789)
- Scientific career
- Fields: Chemistry
- Workplaces: Academy of Science

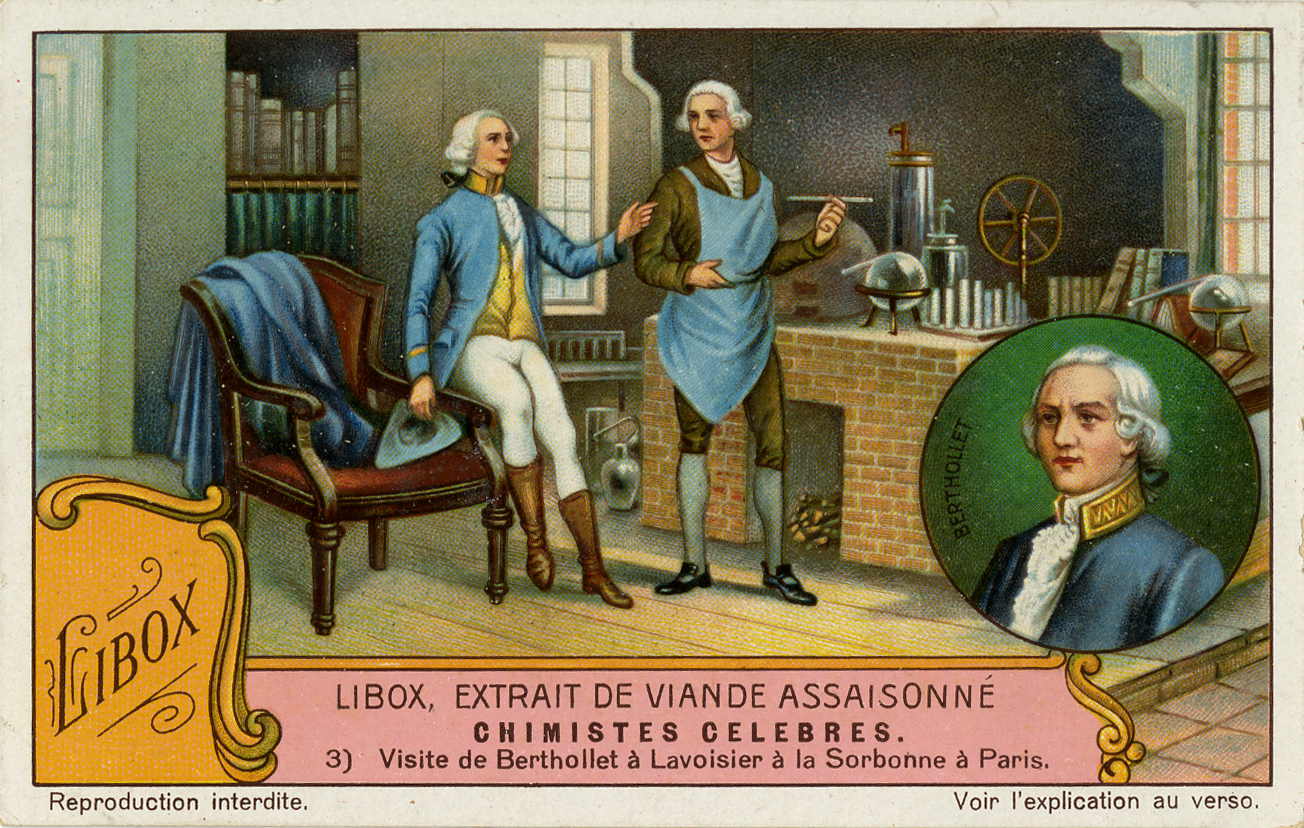
Lavoisier and Berthollet, Chimistes Celebres, Liebig's Extract of Meat Company Trading Card, 1929

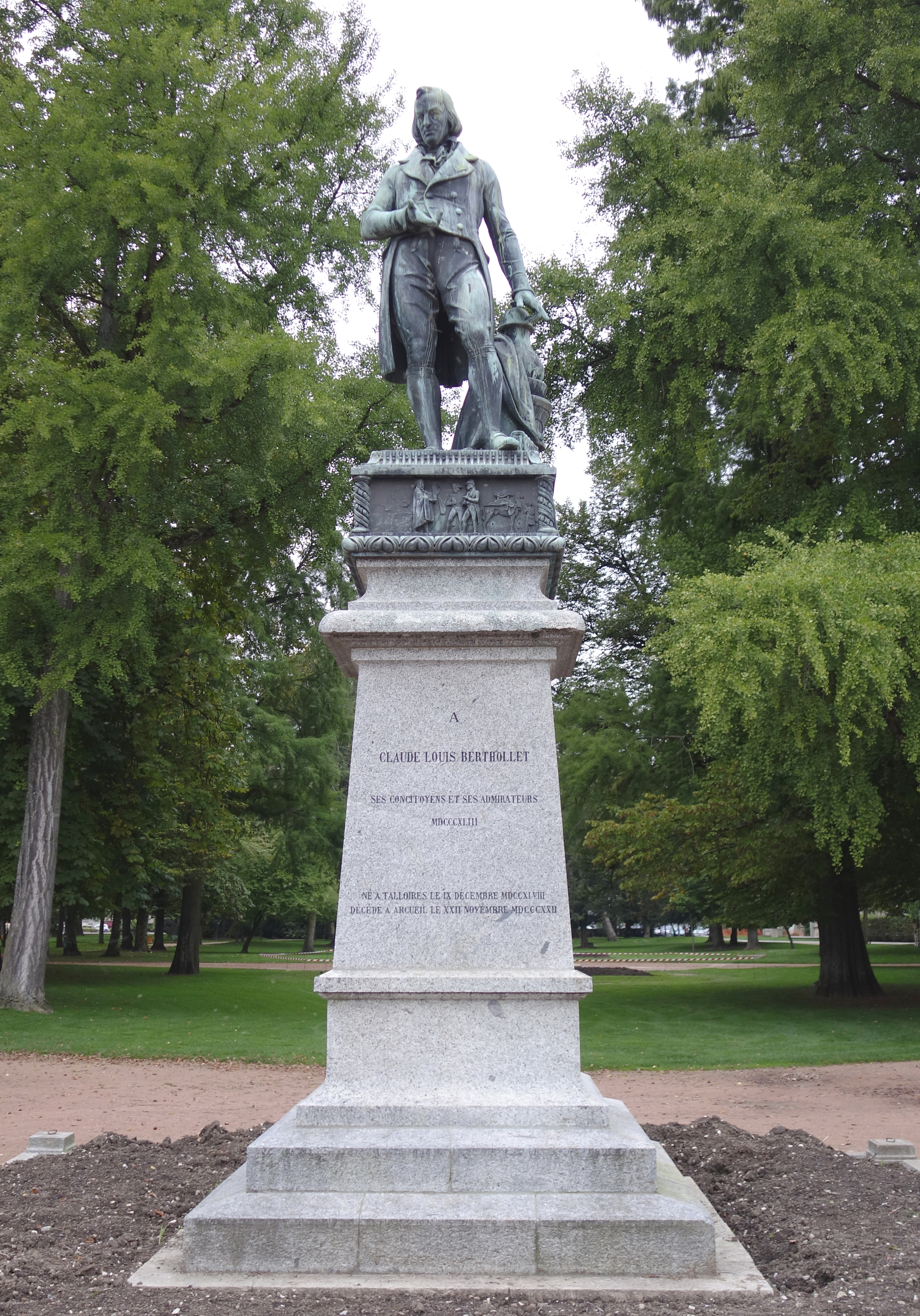
Claude Louis Berthollet statue in Annecy, France

Claude Louis Berthollet (French pronunciation: [klod lwi bɛʁtɔlɛ], 9 December 1748 – 6 November 1822) was a Savoyard-French chemist who became vice president of the French Senate in 1804. He is known for his scientific contributions to the theory of chemical equilibria via the mechanism of reverse chemical reactions, and for his contribution to modern chemical nomenclature. On a practical basis, Berthollet was the first to demonstrate the bleaching action of chlorine gas, and was first to develop a solution of sodium hypochlorite as a modern bleaching agent.

== Biography ==
Claude Louis Berthollet was born in Talloires, near Annecy, then part of the Duchy of Savoy, in 1749. He started his studies at Chambéry and then in Turin where he graduated in medicine. Berthollet's great new developments in works regarding chemistry made him, in a short period of time, an active participant of the Academy of Science in 1780.

Berthollet, along with Antoine Lavoisier and others, devised a chemical nomenclature, or a system of names, which serves as the basis of the modern system of naming chemical compounds. He also carried out research into dyes and bleaches, being first to introduce the use of chlorine gas as a commercial bleach in 1785. He first produced a modern bleaching liquid in 1789 in his laboratory on the quay Javel in Paris, France, by passing chlorine gas through a solution of sodium carbonate. The resulting liquid, known as "Eau de Javel" ("Javel water"), was a weak solution of sodium hypochlorite. Another strong chlorine oxidant and bleach which he investigated and was the first to produce, potassium chlorate (KClO_{3}), is known as Berthollet's Salt.

Berthollet first determined the elemental composition of the gas ammonia, in 1785.

Berthollet was one of the first chemists to recognize the characteristics of a reverse reaction, and hence, chemical equilibrium.

Berthollet was engaged in a long-term battle with another French chemist, Joseph Proust, on the validity of the law of definite proportions. While Proust believed that chemical compounds are composed of a fixed ratio of their constituent elements irrespective of the methods of production, Berthollet believed that this ratio can change according to the ratio of the reactants initially taken. Although Proust proved his theory by accurate measurements, his theory was not immediately accepted partially due to Berthollet's authority. His law was finally accepted when Berzelius confirmed it in 1811, but it was found later that Berthollet was not completely wrong because there exists a class of compounds that do not obey the law of definite proportions. These non-stoichiometric compounds are also named berthollides in his honor.

Berthollet was one of several scientists who went with Napoleon to Egypt and was a member of the physics and natural history section of the Institut d'Égypte.

== Awards and honours ==
In April 1789 Berthollet was elected a Fellow of the Royal Society of London. In 1801, he was elected a foreign member of the Royal Swedish Academy of Sciences. In 1809, Berthollet was elected an associate member first class of the Royal Institute of the Netherlands, predecessor of the Royal Netherlands Academy of Arts and Sciences. He was elected an Honorary Fellow of the Royal Society of Edinburgh in 1820 and a Foreign Honorary Member of the American Academy of Arts and Sciences in 1822.

Claude-Louis Berthollet's 1788 publication entitled Méthode de Nomenclature Chimique, published with colleagues Antoine Lavoisier, Louis Bernard Guyton de Morveau, and Antoine François, comte de Fourcroy, was honored by a Citation for Chemical Breakthrough Award from the Division of History of Chemistry of the American Chemical Society, presented at the Académie des Sciences (Paris) in 2015.

A French High School located in Annecy is named after him (Lycée Claude Louis Berthollet).

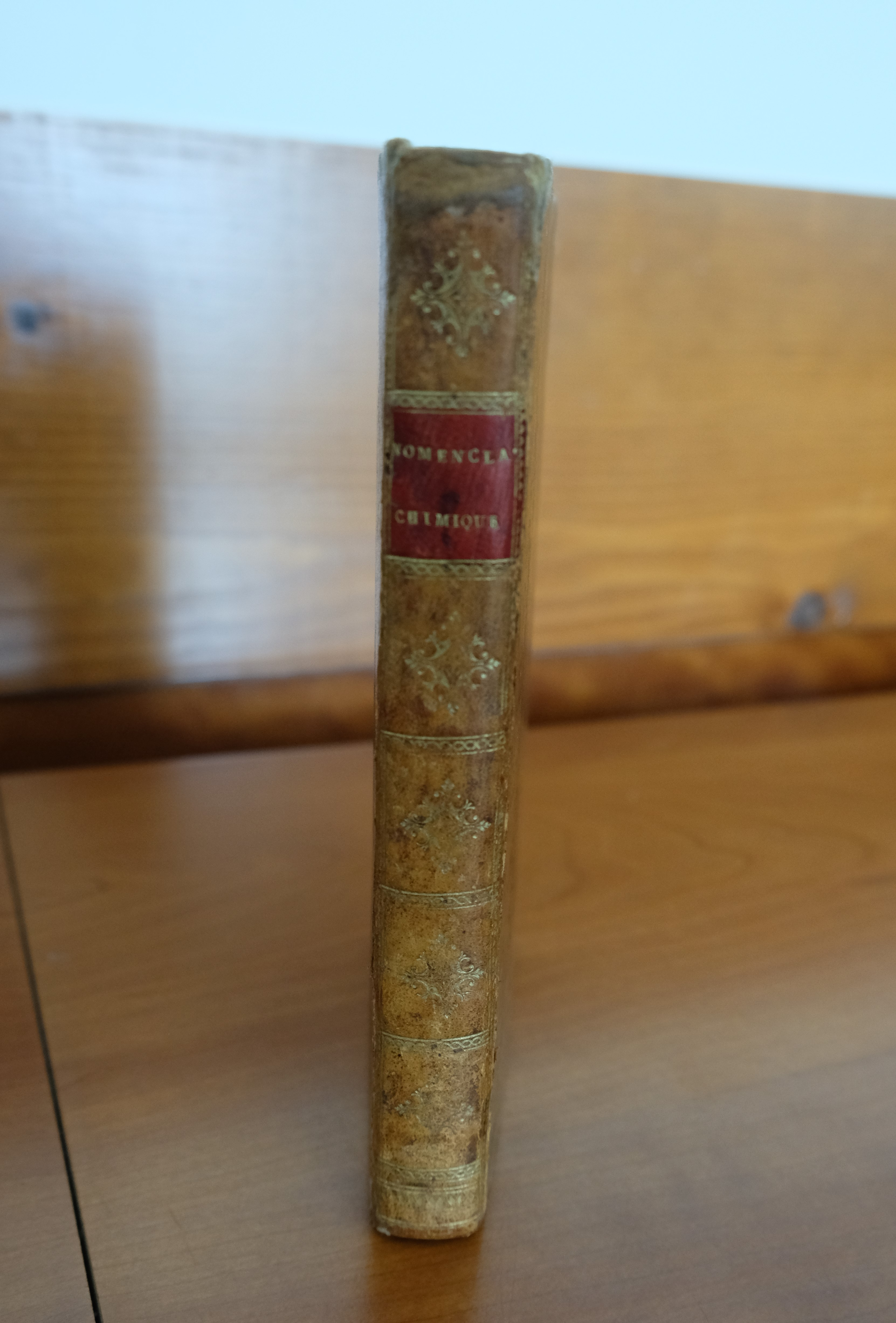
1787 copy of "Méthode de Nomenclature Chimique"

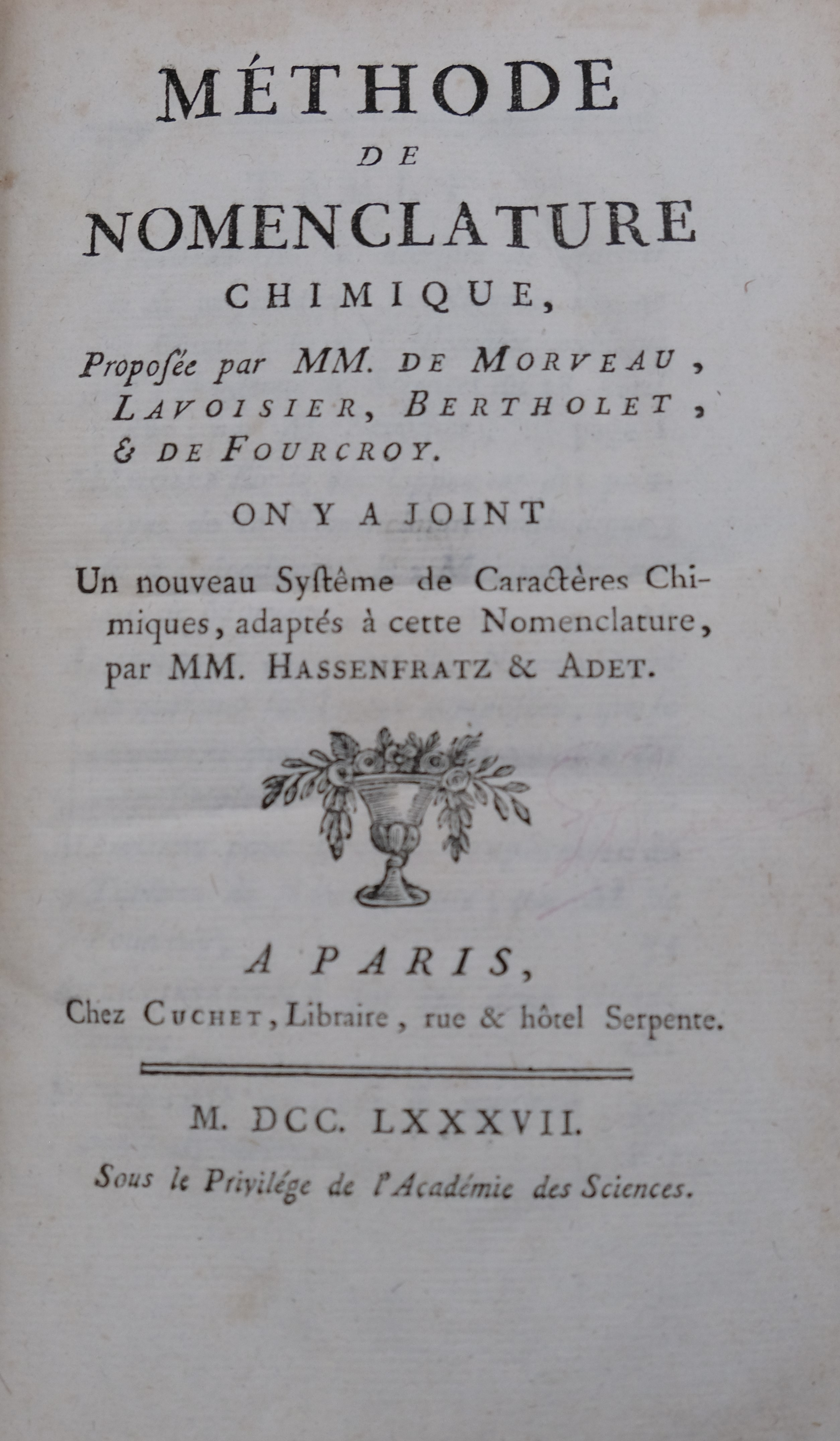
Title page of "Méthode de Nomenclature Chimique"

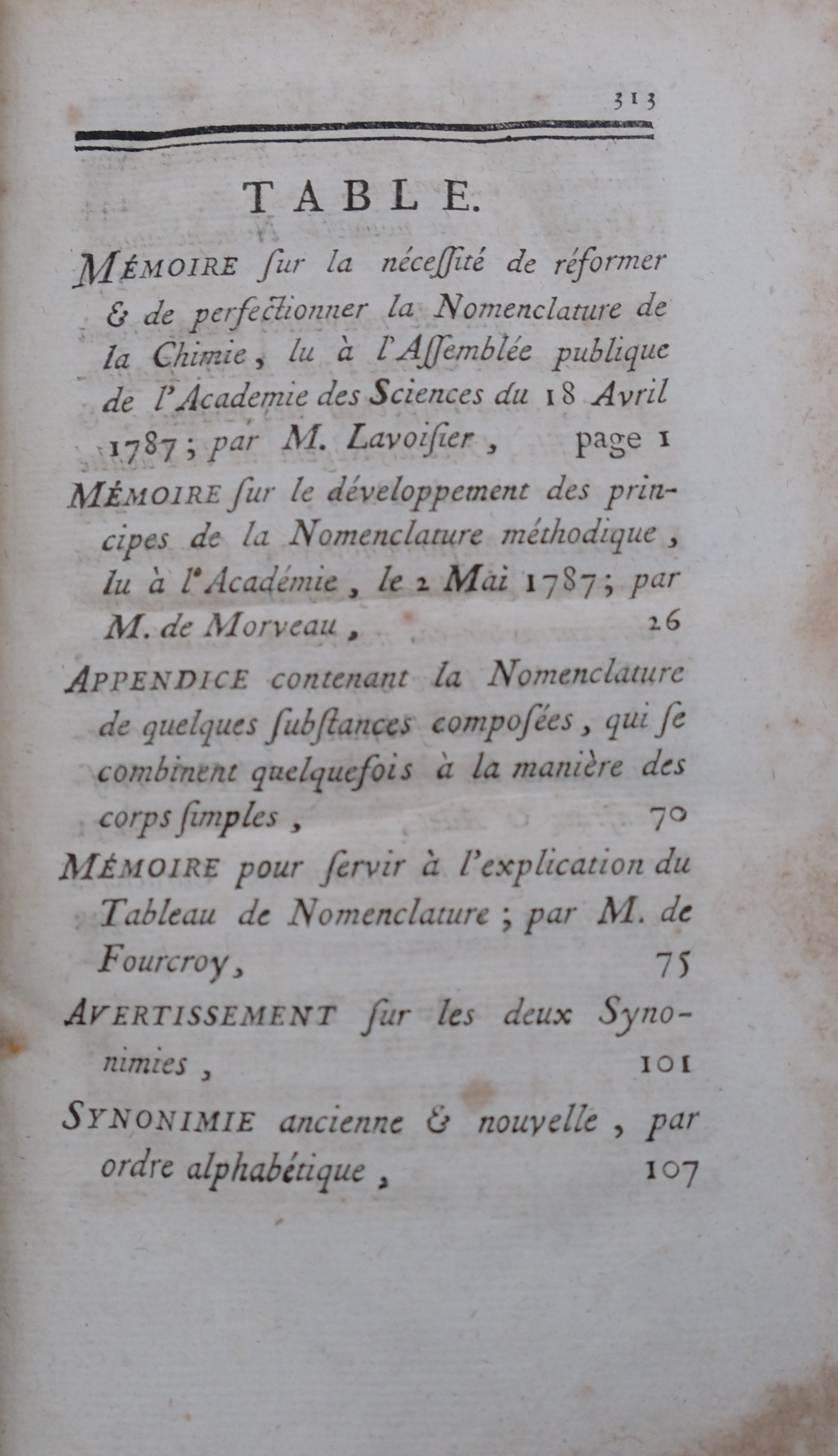
Table of contents for "Méthode de Nomenclature Chimique"

== Personal life ==
Berthollet married Marie Marguerite Baur in 1788. Their son, Amédée-Barthélémy Berthollet, died in 1811 of carbon monoxide poisoning via charcoal-burning suicide in which he had recorded his physiological and psychological experiences as a final scientific contribution before losing consciousness and succumbing to the fumes.

Berthollet was accused of being an atheist.

He died in Arcueil, France in 1822.

== See also ==
- Society of the Friends of Truth
