= Iodyl fluoride =

Names
- IUPAC name: Fluoro(dioxo)-λ^{5}-iodane; Iodine(V) fluoride dioxide

Identifiers
CAS Number	28633-62-7
3D model (JSmol)	Interactive image
ChemSpider	57449638
PubChem CID	44546993
CompTox Dashboard (EPA)	DTXSID20659296
- InChI: InChI=1S/FIO2/c1-2(3)4 Key: FRYHXHDHQQGJSF-UHFFFAOYSA-N
- SMILES: O=I(F)=O

Properties
Chemical formula	IO_{2}F
Molar mass	177.901 g·mol^{−1}
Appearance	colorless crystals
Density	4.982 g/cm^{3}
Melting point	200 °C (392 °F; 473 K)
Solubility in water	Reacts with water

Related compounds
Related compounds	Chloryl fluoride; Bromyl fluoride; Iodosyl pentafluoride; Iodosyl trifluoride; Periodyl fluoride; Iodyl trifluoride
- Except where otherwise noted, data are given for materials in their standard state (at 25 °C [77 °F], 100 kPa). Infobox references

Iodyl fluoride is an inorganic compound of iodine, fluorine, and oxygen with the chemical formula IO_{2}F. It is in the form of colorless crystals. Iodyl fluoride features iodine in the oxidation state of +5. The compound was initially synthesized in 1951.

== Synthesis ==
Iodyl fluoride can be decomposed by iodosyl trifluoride heated to 110 °C (230 °F) in nitrogen. Since this reaction is reversible, the reaction requires constant removal of iodine pentafluoride.

2 IOF_{3} ⇌ IO_{2}F + IF_{5}

It can also be obtained by dissolving iodine pentoxide, I_{2}O_{5}, in anhydrous hydrogen fluoride.

I_{2}O_{5} + HF → IO_{2}F + HIO_{3}

== Physical properties ==
Iodyl fluoride forms colorless crystals of orthorhombic system. Reacts with water.

== Chemical properties ==
Iodyl fluoride is stable in dry air, but slowly hydrolyzes to iodic and hydrofluoric acids in moisture.

IO_{2}F + H_{2}O → HIO_{3} + HF

The compound reacts with strong fluorinating agents such as bromine trifluoride and selenium tetrafluoride to form iodine pentafluoride. Iodyl fluoride can be reduced to elemental iodine by pure hydrogen peroxide.

3 IO_{2}F + 4 BrF_{3} → 3 IF_{5} + 2 Br_{2} + 3 O_{2}
IO_{2}F + 2 SeF_{4} → IF_{5} + 2 SeOF_{2}
