= Werewolf syndrome in dogs =

Neurological disorder

Structural formula of L-methionine sulfoximine

Canine werewolf syndrome is a neurological disorder caused by poisoning with methionine sulfoximine (MSO), a chemical compound from the sulfoximine group of substances. The disease was already observed in the first half of the 20th century, but fell into disuse with the discontinuation of flour bleaching with nitrogen trichloride (Agene process) from the 1950s onwards (ban in 1958), which produces methionine sulfoximine. From August to December 2024, there was an increase in cases in various European countries, starting in Finland and then spreading to Germany and other European countries. The trigger was certain batches of cattle bones imported from China, although it was never clarified how this substance got into chewing toys.

== Symptoms ==
Werewolf syndrome manifests itself in acute behavioral changes such as howling, screaming, and often panic-stricken flight behavior, as well as pupil dilation and salivation, sometimes accompanied by uncontrolled urination and defecation. In some cases, generalized epileptic seizures also occur. Gait disorders, slight hypothermia, and tachycardia are also observed. In 2024, medium-sized, middle-aged dogs were increasingly affected. The seizures last between 5 and 15 minutes and occur several times a day.

Differential diagnoses include poisoning by drugs or mycotoxins, epilepsy, brain tumors, and encephalitis.

== Treatment ==
In acute cases, trazodone, pregabalin, or gabapentin may be administered; in very severe cases, sedation with dexmedetomidine is possible. In animals with generalized tonic-clonic seizures, the active ingredients commonly used in the treatment of epilepsy, such as phenobarbital, imepitoin, and levetiracetam, have also been used, as well as benzodiazepines in cases of severe acute seizures.
