= Chlorosyl trifluoride =

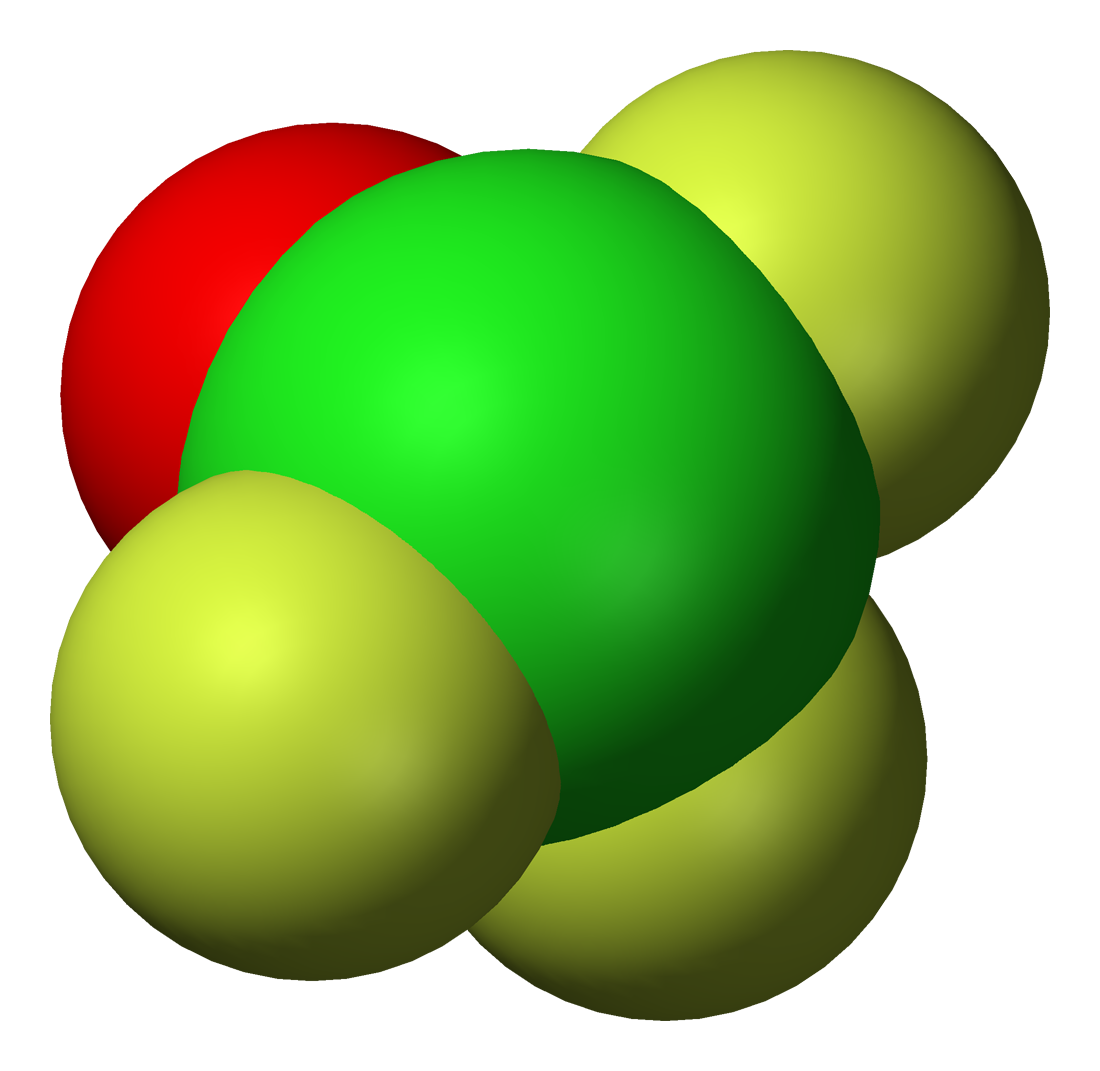

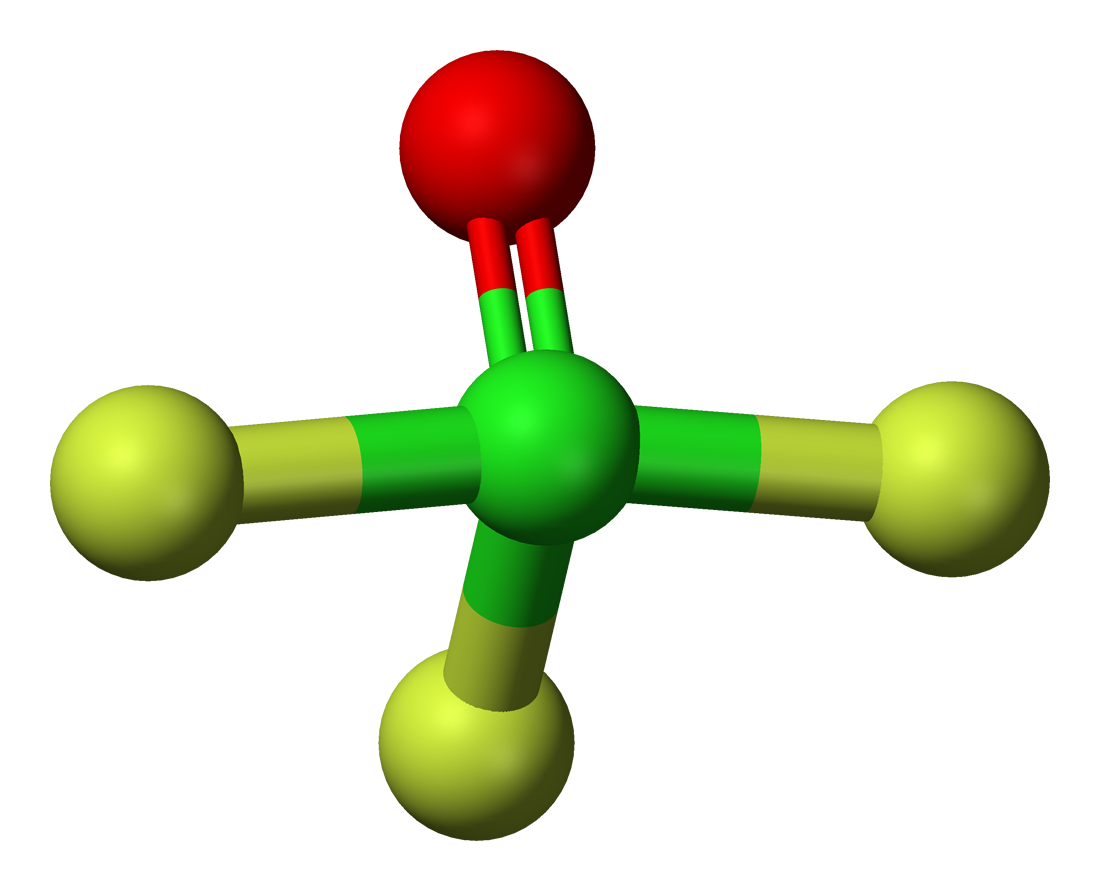

Names
- IUPAC name trifluoro(oxo)-λ5-chlorane
- Other names Chlorine oxide trifluoride Chlorine trifluoride oxide

Identifiers
CAS Number	30708-80-6
3D model (JSmol)	Interactive image
PubChem CID	15388485
CompTox Dashboard (EPA)	DTXSID001278020
- InChI: InChI=1S/ClF3O/c2-1(3,4)5 Key: QPKQQPNQDSQNHS-UHFFFAOYSA-N
- SMILES: O=Cl(F)(F)F

Properties
Chemical formula	ClOF_{3}
Molar mass	108.44 g·mol^{−1}
Appearance	Colorless liquid
Density	1.865 g/cm^{3}
Melting point	−42 °C (−44 °F; 231 K)
Boiling point	29 °C (84 °F; 302 K)

Structure
Crystal structure	monoclinic
Space group	C2/m
Lattice constant	a = 9.826, b = 12.295, c = 4.901 α = 90°, β = 90.338°, γ = 90°
Lattice volume (V)	592.1
Formula units (Z)	8

Hazards
- GHS labelling
Pictograms	(GHS03: Oxidizing) (GHS05: Corrosive) (GHS06: Toxic) (GHS09: Environmental hazard)
Signal word	Danger

Related compounds
Related compounds	Bromosyl trifluoride BrOF_{3}; Iodosyl trifluoride IOF_{3}
- Except where otherwise noted, data are given for materials in their standard state (at 25 °C [77 °F], 100 kPa). Infobox references

Chlorosyl trifluoride (chlorine oxide trifluoride or chlorine trifluoride oxide) is a corrosive colorless liquid molecular compound with formula ClOF_{3}. It was developed secretly as a rocket fuel oxidiser.

== Production ==
Chlorosyl trifluoride was originally made at Rocketdyne by treating dichlorine monoxide with fluorine. Other substances that could react with fluorine to make it includes sodium chlorite NaClO_{2}, and chlorine nitrate Cl−O−NO_{2}. The first published production method was a reaction of dichlorine monoxide with oxygen difluoride OF_{2}. Yet other production methods are reactions between ClO_{2}F or ClO_{3}F and chlorine fluorides. A safer approach is the use chlorine nitrate with fluorine.

== Reactions ==
As a Lewis base it can lose a fluoride ion to Lewis acids, yielding the difluorooxochloronium(V) cation [ClOF_{2}]^{+}. Compounds with this include: [ClOF_{2}]^{+}[BF_{4}]^{−}, [ClOF_{2}]^{+}[PF_{6}]^{−}, [ClOF_{2}]^{+}[AsF_{6}]^{−}, [ClOF_{2}]^{+}[SbF_{6}]^{−}, [ClOF_{2}]^{+}[BiF_{6}]^{−}, [ClOF_{2}]^{+}[VF_{6}]^{−}, [ClOF_{2}]^{+}[NbF_{6}]^{−}, [ClOF_{2}]^{+}[TaF_{6}]^{−}, [ClOF_{2}]^{+}[UF_{6}]^{−}, ([ClOF_{2}]^{+})_{2}[SiF_{6}]^{2−}, [ClOF_{2}]^{+}[MoOF_{5}]^{−}, [ClOF_{2}]^{+}[Mo_{2}O_{4}F_{9}]^{−}, [ClOF_{2}]^{+}[PtF_{6}].

Functioning as a Lewis acid, it can gain a fluoride ion from a strong base to yield a tetrafluorooxochlorate(V) anion ClOF^{−}_{4}. These include K^{+}[ClOF_{4}]^{−} (potassium tetrafluorooxochlorate(V)), Rb^{+}[ClOF_{4}]^{−} (rubidium tetrafluorooxochlorate(V)), and Cs^{+}[ClOF_{4}]^{−} (caesium tetrafluorooxochlorate(V)). These three salts are white crystalline solids. This allows purification of ClOF_{3}, as at room temperature a solid complex is formed, but this decomposes between 50 and 70 °C. Other likely impurities either will not react with alkali fluoride, or if they do will not easily decompose.

Chlorosyl trifluoride fluoridates various materials such as chlorine monoxide, chlorine, glass or quartz.

ClOF_{3} + Cl_{2}O → 2 ClF + ClO_{2}F
2 ClOF_{3} + 2 Cl_{2} → 6 ClF + O_{2} at 200 °C

Chlorosyl trifluoride adds to chlorine fluorosulfate:

ClOF_{3} + 2 ClOSO_{2}F → S_{2}O_{5}F_{2} + FClO_{2} + 2 ClF.

The reaction also produces SO_{2}F_{2}.

Chlorosyl trifluoride can fluoridate and add oxygen in the same reaction, reacting with molybdenum pentafluoride, silicon tetrafluoride, tetrafluorohydrazine (over 100 °C), HNF_{2}, and F_{2}NCOF. From HNF_{2} the main result was NF_{3}O. From MoF_{5}, the results were MoF_{6} and MoOF_{4}.

It reacts explosively with hydrocarbons. With small amounts of water, ClO_{2}F is formed along with HF.

Over 280 °C, ClOF_{3} decomposes to oxygen and chlorine trifluoride.

== Properties ==
The boiling point of chlorine trifluoride oxide is 29 °C.

The shape of the molecule is a trigonal bipyramid, with two fluorine atoms at the top and bottom (apex) (F_{a}) and an electron pair, oxygen and fluorine (F_{e}) on the equator. The Cl=O bond length is 1.405 Å, Cl-F_{e} 1.603 Å, other Cl-F_{a} 1.713 Å, ∠F_{e}ClO=109° ∠F_{a}ClO=95°, ∠F_{a}ClF_{e}=88°. The molecule is polarised, Cl has a +1.76 charge, O has −0.53, equatorial F has −0.31 and apex F has −0.46. The total dipole moment is 1.74 D.
