= Aminochlorination =

Chemical reaction

In organic synthesis, aminochlorination is a reaction that installs both a chlorine atom and an amino (or amido) group to give an 2-aminoalkyl chloride. The reaction typically is effected by combining alkene substrates with chloramines. An alternative implementation involves Pd(II)-induced nucleophilic attack of the amine on the alkene followed by oxidation by a cupric chloride.
