= C6H11NO =

The molecular formula C_{6}H_{11}NO may refer to:

- Caprolactam (CPL), (CH_{2})_{5}C(O)NH
  - the repeating unit of nylon 6 (polycaprolactam), −CO(CH_{2})_{5}NH−
- Cyclohexanone oxime, (CH_{2})_{5}C=NOH
- N-Formylpiperidine, (CH_{2})_{5}NCHO
- Pentyl isocyanate, CH_{3}(CH_{2})_{4}NCO
- 1-Methyl-4-piperidone, OC(CH_{2})_{4}NCH_{3}
- the methoxyisobutylisonitrile (MIBI) ligand, CH_{3}C(CH_{3})(OCH_{3})CH_{2}NC−
