= Fluoroamine =

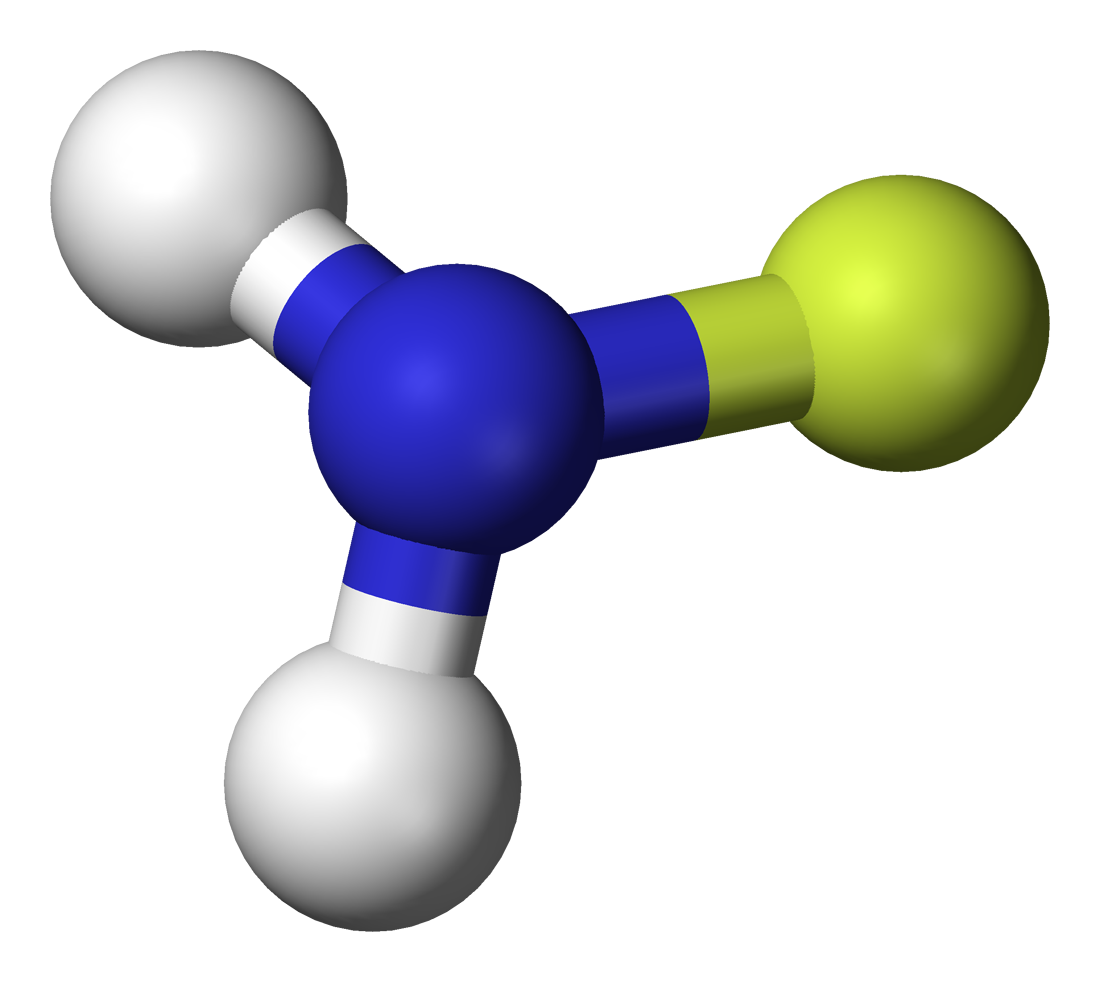

Names
- IUPAC name Fluoroamine
- Other names: Fluoramine; Monofluoroamine; Monofluoroammonia

Identifiers
CAS Number	15861-05-9
3D model (JSmol)	Interactive image
ChemSpider	123451
PubChem CID	139987
CompTox Dashboard (EPA)	DTXSID80166476
- InChI: InChI=1S/FH2N/c1-2/h2H2 Key: MDQRDWAGHRLBPA-UHFFFAOYSA-N; InChI=1/FH2N/c1-2/h2H2 Key: MDQRDWAGHRLBPA-UHFFFAOYAL
- SMILES: FN

Properties
Chemical formula	NH_{2}F
Molar mass	35.021 g·mol^{−1}
Appearance	gas
Density	1.431 g/L

Related compounds
Related compounds	Chloramine; Chlorodifluoroamine
- Except where otherwise noted, data are given for materials in their standard state (at 25 °C [77 °F], 100 kPa). verify (what is ?) Infobox references

Fluoroamine or fluoramine is a chemical compound with formula NH_{2}F. It is analogous to monochloramine, but rarely studied. It is an unstable gas.

The term fluoroamine usually refers to amines with fluorinated organyl substituents of hydrogens of ammonia, fluoroamine and difluoramine NHF_{2}, an example being perfluorotributylamine N(CF_{2}CF_{2}CF_{2}CF_{3})_{3} and perfluoromethyldiethylamine N(CF_{3})(CF_{2}CF_{3})_{2}.

The term fluoroamine may also refer to organyl substituents of hydrogens of fluoroamine.
