= Chloramines =

Class of chemical compounds

Chloramines refer to derivatives of ammonia and organic amines wherein one or more N−H bonds have been replaced by N−Cl bonds. Two classes of compounds are considered: inorganic chloramines and organic chloramines. Chloramines are the most widely used members of the halamines.

== Inorganic chloramines ==
Inorganic chloramines comprise three compounds: monochloramine (NH_{2}Cl), dichloramine (NHCl_{2}), and nitrogen trichloride (NCl_{3}). Monochloramine is of broad significance as a disinfectant for water.

Inorganic chloramines are produced by the reaction of ammonia and hypochlorous acid or chlorine. An urban legend claims that mixing household bleach (aqueous sodium hypochlorite) with ammonia-based cleaners releases chlorine gas or mustard gas; in reality, the gas produced by the reaction is a mixture of inorganic chloramines.

== Organic chloramines ==
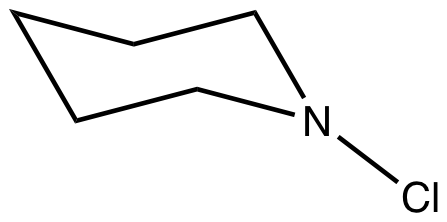
N-Chloropiperidine is a rare example of an organic chloramine.

Chloramine-T is often referred to as a chloramine, but it is really a salt (CH_{3}C_{6}H_{4}SO_{2}NClNa) derived from a chloramine.

Organic chloramines feature the NCl functional group attached to an organic substituent. The simplest organic chloramine is N-chloromethylamine, CH_{3}NHCl; notable examples include N-chloromorpholine (ClN(CH_{2}CH_{2})_{2}O), N-chloropiperidine, and N-chloroquinuclidinium chloride.

Chloramines are commonly produced by the action of sodium hypochlorite on secondary amines:

R_{2}NH + NaOCl → R_{2}NCl + NaOH

Tert-butyl hypochlorite can be used instead of bleach:

R_{2}NH + t-BuOCl → R_{2}NCl + t-BuOH

Very few chloramines are stable, and they easily decompose. In acid, they hydrolyze in the Hofmann–Löffler reaction; in base, they eliminate to the corresponding imines.

== Swimming pools ==
Chloramines are formed by reaction of chlorine used to disinfect swimming pools with ammonia and urea introduced into the pools by human perspiration, saliva, mucus, urine, and other biologic substances, and by insects and other pests. Chloramines, especially trichloramine, are responsible for most of the "chlorine smell" of pools, as well as for skin, eye, and respiratory irritation.
