= Chlorosyl fluoride =

Names
- Other names Chlorine(III) fluoride oxide

Identifiers
CAS Number	22363-68-4
3D model (JSmol)	Interactive image
ChEBI	CHEBI:30127
ChemSpider	21864975
PubChem CID	24906310
- InChI: InChI=1S/ClFO/c2-1-3 Key: AXCBHWGTRNNXKG-UHFFFAOYSA-N
- SMILES: O=ClF

Properties
Chemical formula	FClO
Molar mass	70.45 g·mol^{−1}
- Except where otherwise noted, data are given for materials in their standard state (at 25 °C [77 °F], 100 kPa). Infobox references

Chlorosyl fluoride is an inorganic compound of chlorine, fluorine, and oxygen with the chemical formula F−Cl=O.

== Synthesis ==
- Partial hydrolysis of chlorine trifluoride in diluted gas phase at low temperatures.
- Reaction of chlorine trifluoride with nitric acid.

== Chemical properties ==
Chlorosyl fluoride is thermolabile and disproportionates to ClF and FClO_{2}:

2 FClO → ClF + FClO_{2}
2 FClO → 2 ClF + O_{2}
