= Piperidine N-piperoyltransferase =

Enzyme

piperidine N-piperoyltransferase

Identifiers
- EC no.: 2.3.1.145
- CAS no.: 126806-22-2

Databases
- IntEnz: IntEnz view
- BRENDA: BRENDA entry
- ExPASy: NiceZyme view
- KEGG: KEGG entry
- MetaCyc: metabolic pathway
- PRIAM: profile
- PDB structures: RCSB PDB PDBe PDBsum
- Gene Ontology: AmiGO / QuickGO
Search
- PMC: articles
- PubMed: articles
- NCBI: proteins

In enzymology, a piperidine N-piperoyltransferase (EC 2.3.1.145) is an enzyme that catalyzes the chemical reaction

(E,E)-piperoyl-CoA + piperidine $\rightleftharpoons$ CoA + N-[(E,E)-piperoyl]-piperidine

Thus, the two substrates of this enzyme are (E,E)-piperoyl-CoA and piperidine, whereas its two products are CoA and [[N-[(E,E)-piperoyl]-piperidine]].

This enzyme belongs to the family of transferases, specifically those acyltransferases transferring groups other than aminoacyl groups. The systematic name of this enzyme class is (E,E)-piperoyl-CoA:piperidine N-piperoyltransferase. Other names in common use include piperidine piperoyltransferase, and piperoyl-CoA:piperidine N-piperoyltransferase.
