= Bromyl fluoride =

Names
- Other names Bromine fluoride dioxide

Identifiers
CAS Number	22585-64-4
3D model (JSmol)	Interactive image
ChemSpider	10323843
PubChem CID	15799711
CompTox Dashboard (EPA)	DTXSID20578418
- InChI: InChI=1S/BrFO2/c2-1(3)4 Key: MQCDGGKZTTYBRJ-UHFFFAOYSA-N
- SMILES: O=Br(=O)F

Properties
Chemical formula	BrO_{2}F
Molar mass	130.900 g·mol^{−1}
Appearance	colorless liquid
Melting point	−9 °C (16 °F; 264 K)
Solubility in water	reacts with water

Related compounds
Related compounds	Chloryl fluoride; Iodyl fluoride
- Except where otherwise noted, data are given for materials in their standard state (at 25 °C [77 °F], 100 kPa). Infobox references

Bromyl fluoride is an inorganic compound of bromine, fluorine, and oxygen with the chemical formula BrO_{2}F.

== Synthesis ==
- A reaction of K^{+}[BrF_{4}O]^{−} (potassium tetrafluorooxobromate(V)) with HF.
- Also, reactions of BrF_{5} with IO_{2}F, IOF_{3}, and I_{2}O_{5} produce BrO_{2}F.
- Hydrolysis of bromine pentafluoride at low temperatures:

BrF_{5} + 2 H_{2}O → BrO_{2}F + 4 HF (1).

== Physical properties ==
The compound forms a colorless volatile liquid that decomposes at temperatures above 10 °C. It is highly reactive and unstable, and corrodes glass at room temperature due the formation of HF upon reaction with water (1).

== Chemical properties ==
- Decomposes when heated:

3 BrO_{2}F → BrF_{3} + Br_{2} + 3 O_{2}

- Reacts violently with water:

BrO_{2}F + H_{2}O → HBrO_{3} + HF

- Reacts with alkalis:

BrO_{2}F + 2 NaOH → NaBrO_{3} + NaF + H_{2}O
