= C6H13N =

The molecular formula C_{6}H_{13}N (molar mass: 99.17 g/mol, exact mass: 99.1048 u) may refer to:

- 1-Methylpiperidine
- Azepane, a heterocycle
- Cyclohexylamine, an amine derived from cyclohexane
