= Jean'ne Shreeve =

American chemist

Jean'ne Marie Shreeve (born 1933) is an American chemist known for her studies of fluorine compounds and explosives. She has held her namesake professorship at the University of Idaho since 2004.

== Early life and education ==
Born in Deer Lodge, Montana in 1933, Jean'ne Shreeve was the second of two children to Mary-Frances and Charles W. Shreeve. She was named after the popular 1928 song "Jeannine, I Dream of Lilac Time". Though Jean'ne's father worked for the Northern Pacific Railway, her mother, a teacher, was unemployed for much of her childhood due to the Great Depression and the prevailing notion that families only needed one breadwinner. Mary-Frances later worked as a public school teacher for 40 years. Jean'ne Shreeve had a close bond with her brother William, 22 months older.

She attended public schools in Montana and graduated from Thompson Falls High School before earning a full scholarship to the University of Montana, then known as Montana State University. She worked in the university's library and chemistry department, and participated in intramural sports, band, and a sorority. Shreeve graduated in 1953 with a bachelor's degree in chemistry, then worked for a year at Missoula County High School as a mathematics teacher. She went on to obtain her master's degree in analytical chemistry from the University of Minnesota in 1956 and her Ph.D. in inorganic chemistry from the University of Washington in 1961. At the University of Washington, she worked with fluorine chemist George Cady, sparking her interest in the field.

== Career and research ==
After earning her Ph.D. in 1961, Shreeve took a position as an assistant professor of chemistry at the University of Idaho, where she remained for her entire career, except for short stints as a visiting professor at institutions including the University of Cambridge. Her time at Cambridge was sponsored by the National Science Foundation Ramsey Fellowship. She was promoted to full professor at the University of Idaho in 1967, department head of chemistry in 1973, and vice president in 1987.

In the early years of her career at Idaho, Shreeve worked with Malcolm Renfrew, who mentored her as she built a laboratory and began to publish her research. While at Cambridge, she was mentored by Harry Emeléus, a renowned organic chemist who remained a friend and mentor to Shreeve the rest of his life. After earning the Humboldt Senior Scientist Award, she spent a sabbatical awardee year in Europe, lecturing and working at the University of Bristol and University of Göttingen, where she worked with Oskar Glemser

She has spent much of her career advocating for women chemists and research into fluorine chemistry, serving on a variety of committees for the American Chemical Society and American Association for the Advancement of Science. She has also been recognized for her teaching and mentorship to approximately 130 post-doctoral researchers. Throughout her career, Shreeve has published over 800 scientific papers and holds one patent. She is known for working with highly energetic nitrogenous and fluoridated compounds, and synthesizing a variety of widely used rocket propellant oxidizers.

Shreeve's work includes novel synthesis of chlorodifluoroamine and dinitrogen difluoride, precursors to rocket propellant oxidizers that were difficult to synthesize in usable quantities prior to her work. She is also recognized for her synthesis of fluorinated alkyl sulfoxides by controlled hydrolysis of bis(perfluoroalkyl) sulfur dioxides.

== Honors and awards ==
- National Science Foundation Fellow (1967-1968)
- Distinguished Alumni Award, University of Montana (1970)
- Alfred P. Sloan Fellow (1970-1972)
- Garvan-Olin Medal, American Chemical Society (1972)
- Honorable Alumna, University of Idaho (1972)
- National Director, Iota Sigma Pi (1972-1975)
- Senior U.S. Scientist Award, Alexander Von Humboldt Foundation (1978)
- Award for Creative Work in Fluorine Chemistry, American Chemical Society (1978)
- President, Idaho Academy of Science (1978-1979)
- College Chemistry Teaching Award, Manufacturing Chemists Association (1979)
- Fellow, AAAS (1980)
- Honorary Doctor of Science, University of Montana (1982)
- Board of Directors, American Chemical Society (1985-1991)
- Chair of Chemistry Section, AAAS (1989)
- Board of Directors, AAAS (1991-1995)
- Harry and Carol Mosher Award, Santa Clara Valley Section, American Chemical Society
- Idaho Hall of Fame (2001)
- Member, Royal Society of Chemistry

=== Editorships ===
- Journal of Fluorine Chemistry (1970 - )
- Accounts of Chemical Research (1973-1975)
- Inorganic Synthesis (1976 - )
- Heteroatom Chemistry (1988 - )

== Publications ==
- Burton, DJ; Nodak, AS; Guneratne, R; Su, D; Cen, W; Kirchmeier, RL; Shreeve, JM (1989). "Synthesis of (Sulfodifluoromethyl) Phosphonic Acid". Journal of the American Chemical Society. 111 (5): 1773–1776. Bibcode:1989JAChS.111.1773B. doi:10.1021/ja00187a033.
- Guo, Cai-Yun; Kirchmeier, Robert L.; Shreeve, Jean'ne M. (1991). "A Thirty-Two Membered Fluorinated Multifunctional Heterocycle". Journal of the American Chemical Society. 113 (23): 9000–9001. Bibcode:1991JAChS.113.9000G. doi:10.1021/ja00023a089.
- Gupta, Om Dutt; Kirchmeier, Robert L.; Shreeve, Jean'ne M. (1990). "Reactions of Trifluoroamine Oxide: A Route to Acyclic and Cyclic Fluororamines, and N-Nitrosoamines". Journal of the American Chemical Society. 112 (6): 2383. Bibcode:1990JAChS.112.2383G. doi:10.1021/ja00162a045.
- Kitazume, Tomoya; Shreeve, Jean'ne M. (1978). "Some Chemistry of Fluorinated Octahedral Sulfur Compounds". Journal of the American Chemical Society. 100 (2): 492. Bibcode:1978JAChS.100..492K. doi:10.1021/ja00470a022.
- Su, Debao; Cen, Wenbiao; Kirchmeier, Robert L.; Shreeve, Jean'ne M. (1989). "Synthesis of Fluorinated Phosphonic, Sulfonic, and Mixed Phosphonic/Sulfonic Acids". Canadian Journal of Chemistry. 67 (11): 1795. Bibcode:1989CaJCh..67.1795S. doi:10.1139/v89-278.
