= Chloronitramide anion =

Chemical byproduct of chloramine

- Structural diagram

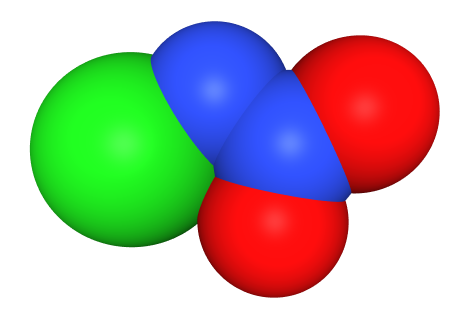
- Spacefill diagram

Names
- IUPAC name Chloro(nitro)azanide
- Other names Chloronitramide anion

Identifiers
3D model (JSmol)	Interactive image
PubChem CID	149810380
CompTox Dashboard (EPA)	DTXSID201356860
- InChI: InChI=1S/ClN2O2/c1-2-3(4)5/q-1 Key: BPBMHZVBNAGSRE-UHFFFAOYSA-N
- SMILES: [N-]([N+](=O)[O-])Cl

Properties
Chemical formula	ClN_{2}O_{2}^{−}
Molar mass	95.46 g/mol
- Except where otherwise noted, data are given for materials in their standard state (at 25 °C [77 °F], 100 kPa). Infobox references

The chloronitramide anion, also known as chloro(nitro)azanide, is a chemical byproduct of the disinfectant chloramine first identified in 2024. It is present in the tap water of about 113 million people in the United States in varying concentrations. Its toxicity has not yet been determined, although it may be removable by an activated carbon filter. Although its molecular formula and structure were unknown, it was first recorded as a byproduct of chloramine in the early 1980s.

Chloramine is often used as an alternative to chlorine for water disinfection because of chlorine's harmful byproducts, and on the basis that clean water improves health much more than small concentrations of byproducts harm it. Other methods of disinfection exist, including ozone (popular in European countries) and UV light, but these cannot currently be used in the US because the law requires water to have small residual amounts of disinfectant to prevent re-infection.

One study of 40 locations in the US found a median chloronitramide anion concentration of 23 micrograms per liter in drinking water, with a first quartile of 1.3 and a third quartile of 92.

== Research ==
=== Early research ===
The chloronitramide anion was first detected as a UV absorbance interference during monitoring of chloramine and dichloramine in 1981. It was then shown to form during the decomposition of both chemicals. It was shown to likely be an anion in 1990. In the 1980s and 1990s methods of producing it in high concentrations were identified, and the molecule was shown through destruction to contain both nitrogen and chlorine. According to Julian Fairey, research on the compound slowed down in the mid-1990s after attempts to identify it were unsuccessful.

=== Identification of structure ===
The structure of the molecule was finally identified in 2024 using a combination of techniques, first identifying the molecular formula, then creating a candidate structure, then confirming it.

Ion chromatography, a method of separating ions and ionizable polar molecules, was used to separate the chloronitramide anion from the many salts present in water samples containing it. Previous attempts to use mass spectrometry on the samples had been stymied by the large number of byproducts; the only known techniques to reliably generate samples of the anion created aqueous solutions whose salinity was higher than that of seawater. Once the ion was isolated, mass spectrometry was sufficient to determine its molecular mass, but it was too simple for structural determination from the fragmentation pattern.

The ion was found to have the molecular formula ClN_{2}O_{2}^{−1} (containing two oxygen atoms, two nitrogen atoms, and one chlorine atom) by electrospray ionisation mass spectrometry. A candidate structure was confirmed by ^{15}N NMR spectroscopy and infrared spectroscopy.

=== Future research ===
Research investigating the toxicity of the chloronitramide anion, as well as the reasons for its formation in high or low concentration in different places, is expected as of late 2024.

== Formation and synthesis ==
Pure chloronitramidate can be produced artificially through nitration of chloramine-T, followed by acidic hydrolysis of the sulfonamide bond.

A similar process is believed to underlie chloronitramidate's formation during water chlorination. Aqueous (mono)chloramine solutions slowly decompose through disproportionation; the reduced product is ammonia, while the oxidized product is dichloramine (NHCl_{2}), which hydrolyzes to nitroxyl (HNO). Dissolved oxygen (O_{2}) then oxidizes nitroxyl to peroxynitrous acid. This decomposes to (among other things) the nitronium ion (NO_{2}^{+}), which can nitrate additional monochloramine. The resulting chloronitramide is a Brønsted-Lowry acid, and deprotonates to give the anion conjugate base.

2NH_{2}Cl → NHCl_{2} + NH_{3}
NHCl_{2} + H_{2}O → HNO + 2H^{+} + 2Cl^{−}
HNO + O_{2} → HOONO
HOONO + H^{+} → NO^{+}_{2} + H_{2}O
NH_{2}Cl + NO^{+}_{2} → ClNHNO_{2} + H^{+}
ClNHNO_{2} → ClNNO^{−}_{2} + H^{+}

== Potential toxicity ==
The EPA web application Generalized Read-Across predicts chloronitramide anion predicts possible toxicity effects in the categories of chronic toxicity, prenatal development toxicity, multigenerational reproductive toxicity, subacute repeat dose toxicity, subchronic toxicity.
