= Chloryl fluoride =

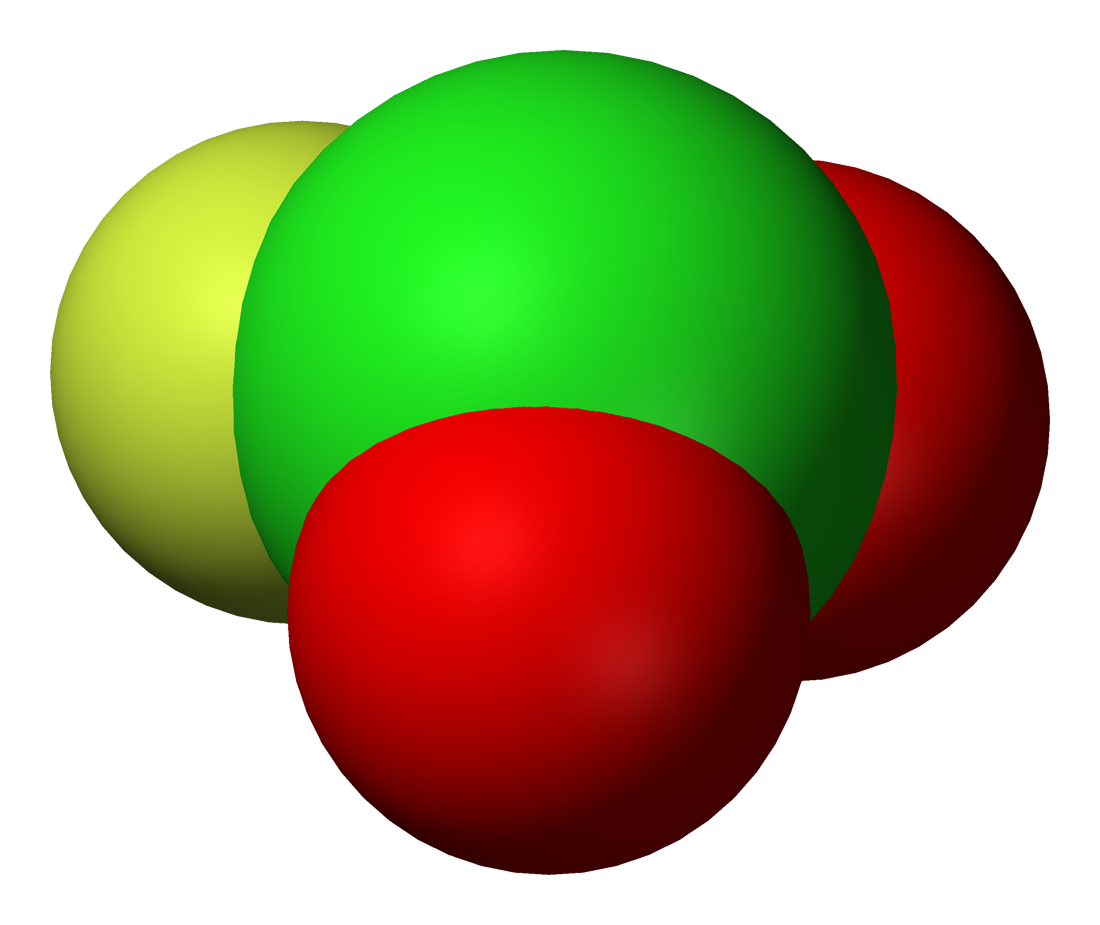

Names
- Other names: Chlorine dioxide fluoride; Chlorine(V) fluoride dioxide

Identifiers
| CAS Number | 13637-83-7 |
| 3D model (JSmol) | Interactive image |
| ChemSpider | 123044 |
| PubChem CID | 139523 |
| CompTox Dashboard (EPA) | DTXSID00159769 |
- InChI: InChI=1S/ClFO2/c2-1(3)4 Key: YVRLYFHVJLYEHM-UHFFFAOYSA-N; InChI=1/ClFO2/c2-1(3)4 Key: YVRLYFHVJLYEHM-UHFFFAOYAO
- SMILES: FCl(=O)=O

Properties
| Chemical formula | ClO_{2}F |
| Molar mass | 86.45 g·mol^{−1} |
| Appearance | Colorless gas |
| Density | 3.534 g/L |
| Melting point | −115 °C |
| Boiling point | −6 °C |

Related compounds
| Related compounds | Bromyl fluoride; Iodyl fluoride; Perchloryl fluoride; Chloryl trifluoride |
- Except where otherwise noted, data are given for materials in their standard state (at 25 °C [77 °F], 100 kPa). verify (what is ?) Infobox references

Chloryl fluoride is the chemical compound with the formula ClO_{2}F. This compound is a gas boiling at −6 °C. It is commonly encountered as side-product in reactions of chlorine fluorides with oxygen sources. It is the acyl fluoride of chloric acid.

== Preparation ==
ClO_{2}F was first reported by Schmitz and Schumacher in 1942, who prepared it by the fluorination of ClO_{2}. The compound is more conveniently prepared by reaction of sodium chlorate and chlorine trifluoride and purified by vacuum fractionation, i.e. selectively condensing this species separately from other products.

6 NaClO_{3} + 4 ClF_{3} → 6 ClO_{2}F + 2 Cl_{2} + 3 O_{2} + 6 NaF

== Structure ==
In contrast to O_{2}F_{2}, ClO_{2}F is a pyramidal molecule as predicted by VSEPR. The differing structures reflects the greater tendency of chlorine to exist in positive oxidation states with oxygen and fluorine ligands. The related Cl-O-F compound perchloryl fluoride, ClO_{3}F, is tetrahedral. The related bromine compound bromyl fluoride (BrO_{2}F) adopts the same structure as ClO_{2}F, whereas iodyl fluoride (IO_{2}F) forms a polymeric substance under standard conditions.

== Precautions ==
Rocket fuel chemist John Drury Clark reported in his book Ignition! that chloryl fluoride "is indecently reactive, and the hardest to keep of all the CI-O-F compounds, since it apparently dissolves the protective metal fluoride coatings that make the storage of ClF_{3} comparatively simple."
