= Perbromyl fluoride =

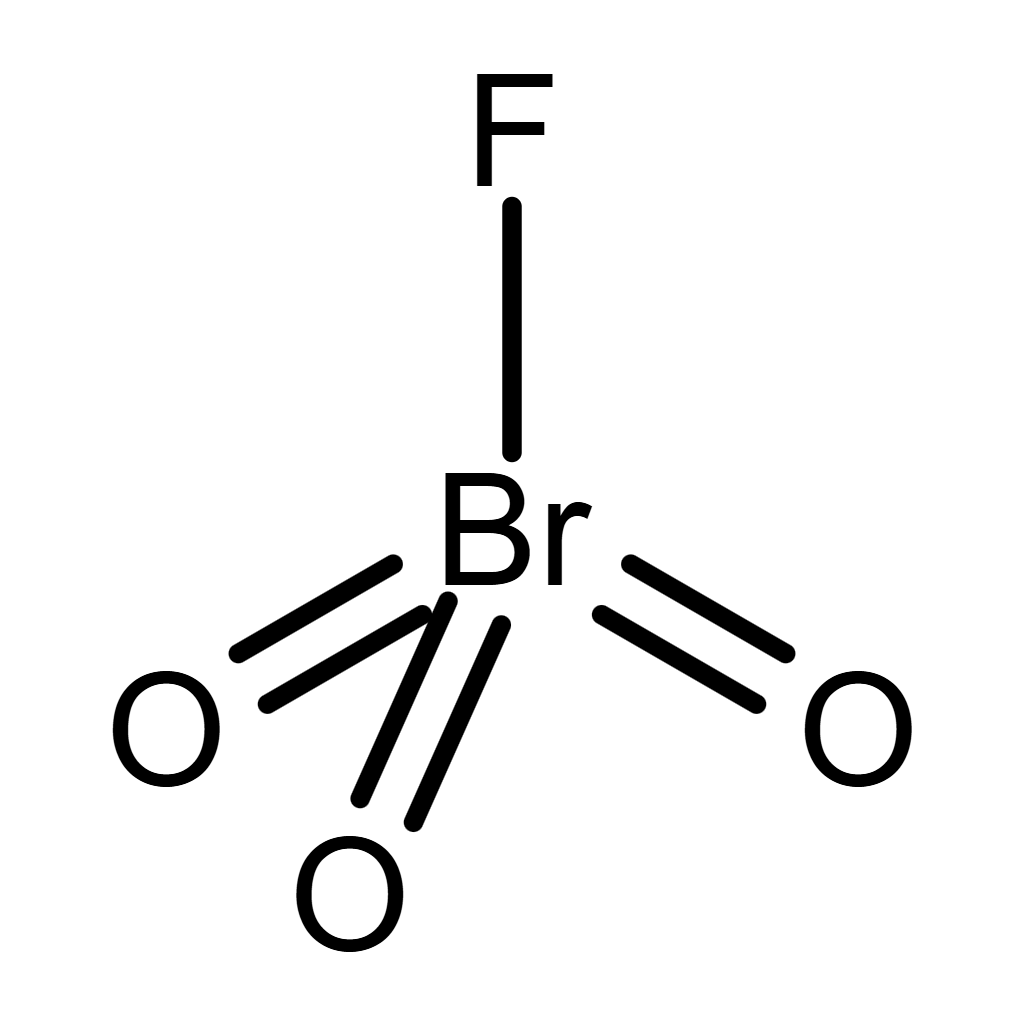

Names
- Other names Bromine fluoride trioxide

Identifiers
CAS Number	25251-03-0
3D model (JSmol)	Interactive image
PubChem CID	44233513
- InChI: InChI=1S/BrFO3/c2-1(3,4)5 Key: FHRGMUIQMATFDZ-UHFFFAOYSA-N
- SMILES: F[Br](=O)(=O)=O

Properties
Chemical formula	BrO_{3}F
Molar mass	146.899 g·mol^{−1}
Appearance	colorless gas
Melting point	−110 °C (−166 °F; 163 K) (approx. temperature of solidification)
Solubility in water	reacts with water

Related compounds
Related compounds	Periodyl fluoride Perchloryl fluoride
- Except where otherwise noted, data are given for materials in their standard state (at 25 °C [77 °F], 100 kPa). Infobox references

Perbromyl fluoride is an inorganic compound of bromine, fluorine, and oxygen with the chemical formula BrO_{3}F.

== Synthesis ==
Synthesis of perbromyl fluoride is by the effect of antimony pentafluoride on a solution of potassium perbromate in hydrofluoric acid:

KBrO_{4} + 2 SbF_{5} + 3 HF → BrO_{3}F + K[SbF_{6}] + H[SbF_{6}]·H_{2}O

== Physical properties ==
Perbromyl fluoride is a colorless gas at room temperature that is stable in the absence of moisture.

== Chemical properties ==
Perbromyl fluoride reacts with water to produce perbromic acid and hydrogen fluoride:

BrO_{3}F + H_{2}O → HBrO_{4} + HF
