= Piperidine =

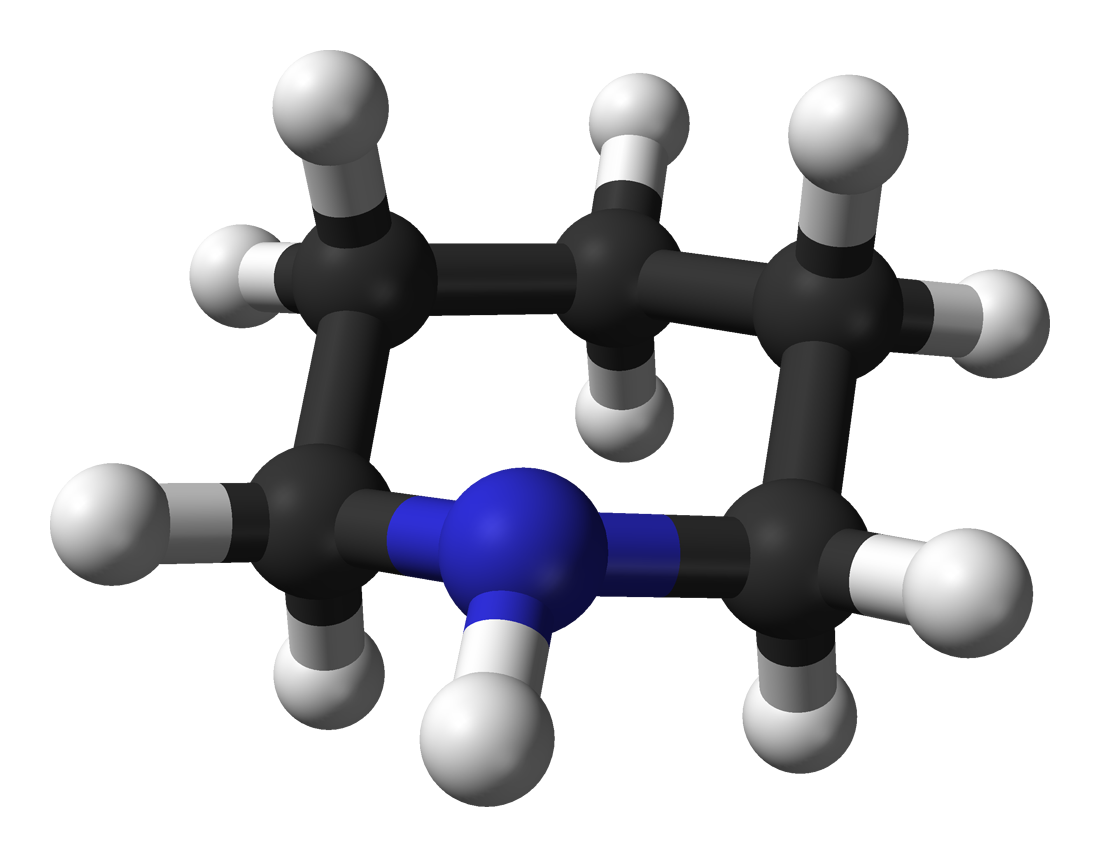

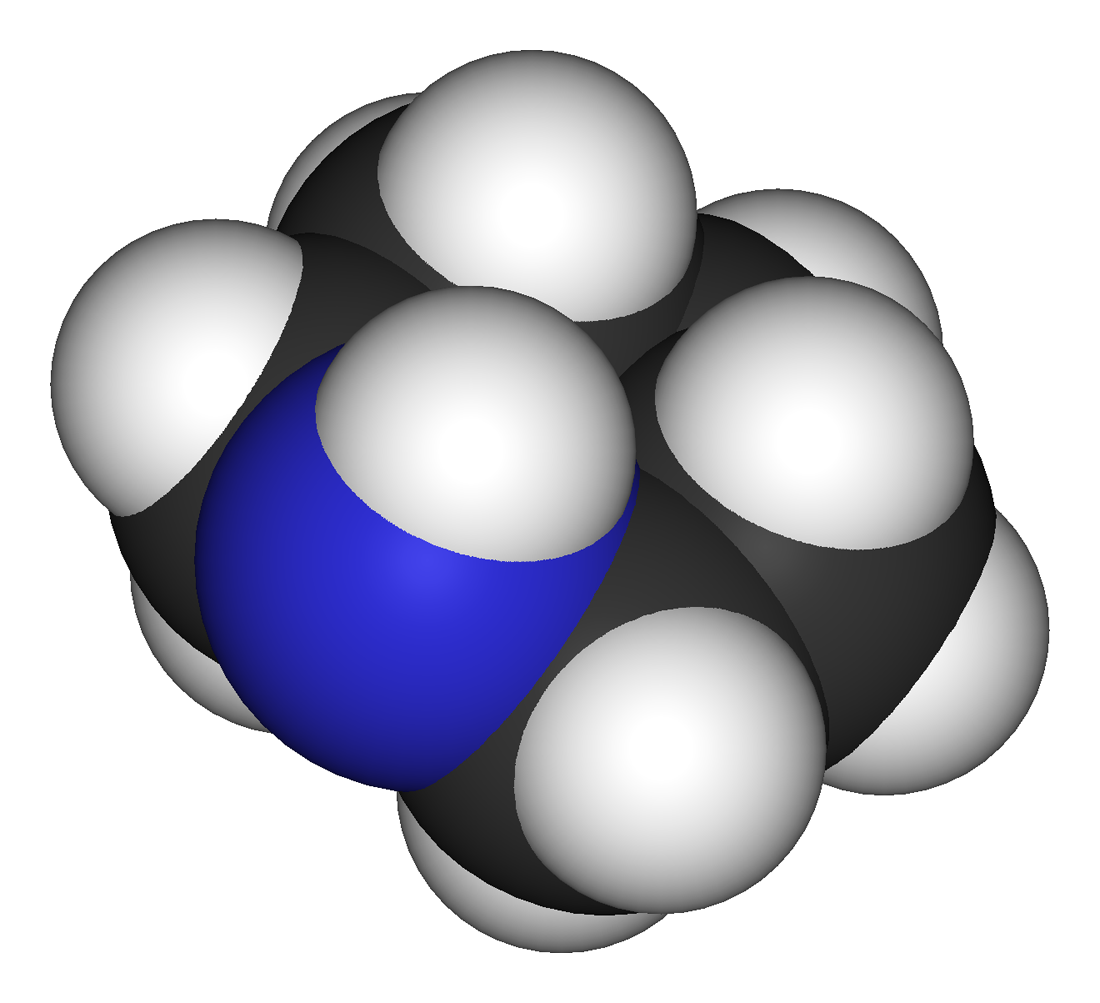

Names
- IUPAC name Piperidine
- Preferred IUPAC name Piperidine
- Other names Hexahydropyridine; Azacyclohexane; Pentamethyleneamine; Azinane

Identifiers
CAS Number	110-89-4
3D model (JSmol)	Interactive image
ChEBI	CHEBI:18049
ChEMBL	ChEMBL15487
ChemSpider	7791
ECHA InfoCard	100.003.467
EC Number	203-813-0
IUPHAR/BPS	5477
KEGG	C01746
PubChem CID	8082
RTECS number	TM3500000
UNII	67I85E138Y
UN number	2401
CompTox Dashboard (EPA)	DTXSID6021165
- InChI: InChI=1S/C5H11N/c1-2-4-6-5-3-1/h6H,1-5H2 Key: NQRYJNQNLNOLGT-UHFFFAOYSA-N; InChI=1/C5H11N/c1-2-4-6-5-3-1/h6H,1-5H2; InChI=1/C5H11N/c1-2-4-6-5-3-1/h6H,1-5H2 Key: NQRYJNQNLNOLGT-UHFFFAOYAY
- SMILES: C1CCNCC1

Properties
Chemical formula	C_{5}H_{11}N
Molar mass	85.150 g·mol^{−1}
Appearance	Colorless liquid
Odor	fishy-ammoniacal, pungent
Density	0.862 g/mL
Melting point	−7 °C (19 °F; 266 K)
Boiling point	106 °C (223 °F; 379 K)
Solubility in water	Miscible
Acidity (pK_{a})	11.22 (protonated)
Magnetic susceptibility (χ)	−64.2·10^{−6} cm^{3}/mol
Viscosity	1.573 cP at 25 °C

Hazards
- GHS labelling
Pictograms	(GHS02: Flammable) (GHS05: Corrosive) (GHS06: Toxic)
Signal word	Danger
Hazard statements	H225, H311, H314, H331
Precautionary statements	P210, P233, P240, P241, P242, P243, P260, P264, P271, P280, P301+P330+P331, P302+P352, P303+P361+P353, P304+P340, P305+P351+P338, P310, P311, P312, P321, P322, P361, P363, P370+P378, P403+P233, P403+P235, P405, P501
NFPA 704 (fire diamond)	3 3 0
Safety data sheet (SDS)	MSDS1
Legal status	BR: Class D1 (Drug precursors)

Related compounds
Related compounds	Pyridine; Pyrrolidine; Piperazine; Phosphorinane; Arsinane
- Except where otherwise noted, data are given for materials in their standard state (at 25 °C [77 °F], 100 kPa). verify (what is ?) Infobox references

Piperidine is an organic compound with the molecular formula (CH_{2})_{5}NH. This heterocyclic amine consists of a six-membered ring containing five methylene bridges (–CH_{2}–) and one amine bridge (–NH–). It is a colorless liquid with an odor described as objectionable, fishy or like ammonia typical of amines. The name comes from the genus name Piper, which is the Latin word for pepper. Although piperidine is a common organic compound, it is best known as a representative structure element within many pharmaceuticals and alkaloids, such as naturally-occurring solenopsins.

== Production ==
Piperidine was first reported in 1850 by the Scottish chemist Thomas Anderson and again, independently, in 1852 by the French chemist Auguste Cahours, who named it. Both of them obtained piperidine by reacting piperine with nitric acid.

Industrially, piperidine is produced by the hydrogenation of pyridine, usually over a molybdenum disulfide catalyst:

C_{5}H_{5}N + 3 H_{2} → C_{5}H_{10}NH

Pyridine can also be reduced to piperidine via a modified Birch reduction using sodium in ethanol.

== Natural occurrence of piperidine and derivatives ==
Piperidine itself has been obtained from black pepper, from Psilocaulon absimile (Aizoaceae), and in Petrosimonia monandra.

The piperidine structural motif is present in numerous natural alkaloids. These include piperine, which gives black pepper its spicy taste. This gave the compound its name. Other examples are the fire ant toxin solenopsin, the nicotine analog anabasine of tree tobacco (Nicotiana glauca), lobeline of Indian tobacco, and the toxic alkaloid coniine from poison hemlock, which was used to put Socrates to death.

== Conformation ==
Piperidine prefers a chair conformation, similar to cyclohexane. Unlike cyclohexane, piperidine has two distinguishable chair conformations: one with the N–H bond in an axial position, and the other in an equatorial position. After much controversy during the 1950s–1970s, the equatorial conformation was found to be more stable by 0.72 kcal/mol in the gas phase. In nonpolar solvents, a range between 0.2 and 0.6 kcal/mol has been estimated, but in polar solvents the axial conformer may be more stable. The two conformers interconvert rapidly through nitrogen inversion; the free energy activation barrier for this process, estimated at 6.1 kcal/mol, is substantially lower than the 10.4 kcal/mol for ring inversion. In the case of N-methylpiperidine, the equatorial conformation is preferred by 3.16 kcal/mol, which is much larger than the preference in methylcyclohexane, 1.74 kcal/mol.

axial conformation	equatorial conformation

== Reactions ==
Piperidine is widely used to convert ketones to enamines. Enamines derived from piperidine are substrates in the Stork enamine alkylation reaction.

Upon treatment with calcium hypochlorite, piperidine converts to N-chloropiperidine, a chloramine with the formula C_{5}H_{10}NCl. The resulting chloramine undergoes dehydrohalogenation to afford the cyclic imine.

== NMR chemical control ==
- ^{13}C NMR: (CDCl_{3}, ppm) 47, 27.2, 25.2
- ^{1}H NMR: (CDCl_{3}, ppm) 2.79, 2.19, 1.51

== Uses ==
Piperidine is used as a solvent and as a base. The same is true for certain derivatives: N-formylpiperidine is a polar aprotic solvent with better hydrocarbon solubility than other amide solvents, and 2,2,6,6-tetramethylpiperidine is a highly sterically hindered base, useful because of its low nucleophilicity and high solubility in organic solvents.

A significant industrial application of piperidine is for the production of dipiperidinyl dithiuram tetrasulfide, which is used as an accelerator of the sulfur vulcanization of rubber.

== List of piperidine medications ==
Minoxidil is a piperidine derivative widely used to prevent hair loss.

Piperidine and its derivatives are ubiquitous building blocks in pharmaceuticals and fine chemicals. The piperidine structure is found in, for example:

- Icaridin (Insect repellent)
- SSRIs (selective serotonin reuptake inhibitors)
  - Paroxetine
- Stimulants and nootropics:
  - Methylphenidate
  - Ethylphenidate
  - Pipradrol
  - Desoxypipradrol
- Histamine 1 (H_{1}) receptor antagonists/inverse agonists:
  - Loratadine
- Histamine 3 (H_{3}) receptor antagonists/inverse agonists:
  - Pitolisant
- SERM (selective estrogen receptor modulators)
  - Raloxifene
- Vasodilators
  - Minoxidil
- Antipsychotic medications:
  - Droperidol
  - Haloperidol
  - Melperone
  - Mesoridazine
  - Risperidone
  - Thioridazine
- Opioids:
  - Dipipanone
  - Fentanyl and analogs
  - Loperamide
  - Pethidine (meperidine)
  - Prodine
- Arylcyclohexylamines:
  - PCP and analogs
- anticholinergic chemical weapons
  - Ditran
  - N-Methyl-3-piperidyl benzilate (JB-336, BZ)

Piperidine is also commonly used in chemical degradation reactions, such as the sequencing of DNA in the cleavage of particular modified nucleotides. Piperidine is also commonly used as a base for the deprotection of Fmoc-amino acids used in solid-phase peptide synthesis.

Piperidine is listed as a Table II precursor under the United Nations Convention Against Illicit Traffic in Narcotic Drugs and Psychotropic Substances due to its use (peaking in the 1970s) in the clandestine manufacture of phencyclidine.
