= Periodyl fluoride =

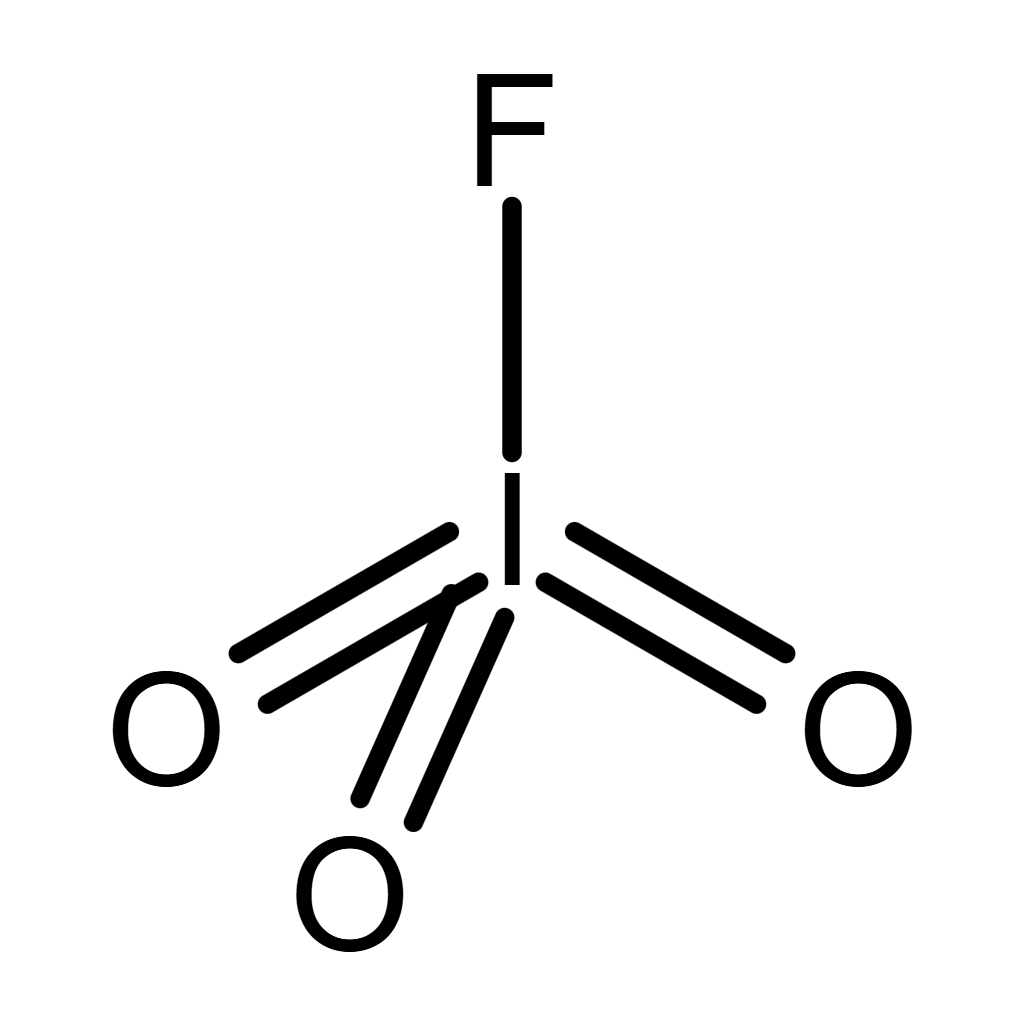

Names
- Other names Periodylfluoride

Identifiers
CAS Number	30708-86-2
3D model (JSmol)	Interactive image
PubChem CID	44233512
- InChI: InChI=1S/FIO3/c1-2(3,4)5 Key: OXDIZDWCOMFELV-UHFFFAOYSA-N
- SMILES: O=I(=O)(=O)F

Properties
Chemical formula	FIO_{3}
Molar mass	193.900 g·mol^{−1}
Appearance	colorless crystals

Related compounds
Related compounds	Iodosyl trifluoride Perchloryl fluoride Perbromyl fluoride
- Except where otherwise noted, data are given for materials in their standard state (at 25 °C [77 °F], 100 kPa). Infobox references

Periodyl fluoride is an inorganic compound of iodine, fluorine, and oxygen with the chemical formula IO_{3}F. The compound has been initially synthesized around 1950.

== Synthesis ==
Synthesis of periodyl fluoride is by fluorination of KIO_{4} in liquid HF:

KIO_{4} + 2 HF → IO_{3}F + KF + H_{2}O

== Physical properties ==
Periodyl fluoride forms colorless crystals. Decomposes at 90 to 100 °C.
