= Perchloryl fluoride =

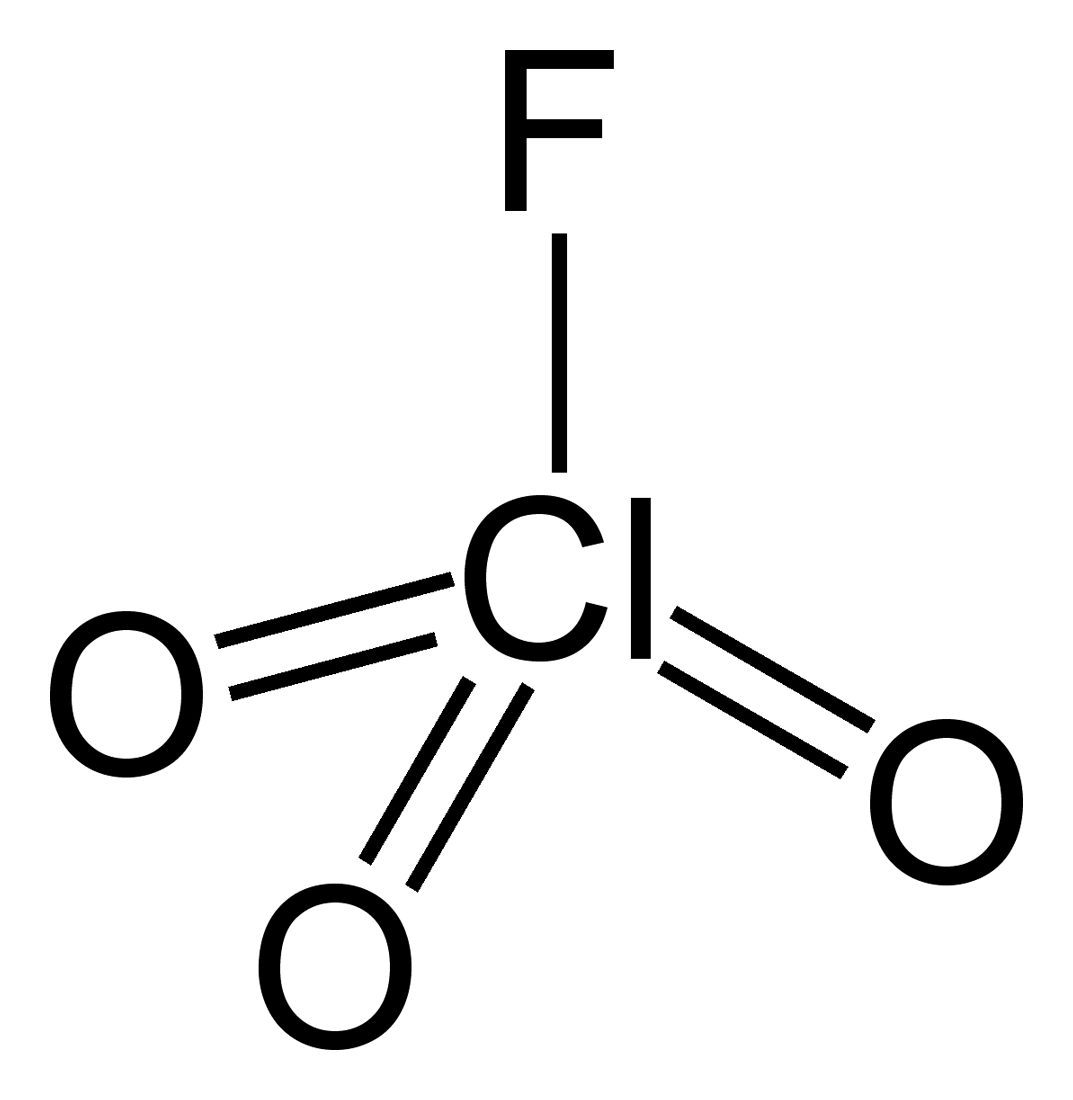
Perchloryl fluoride
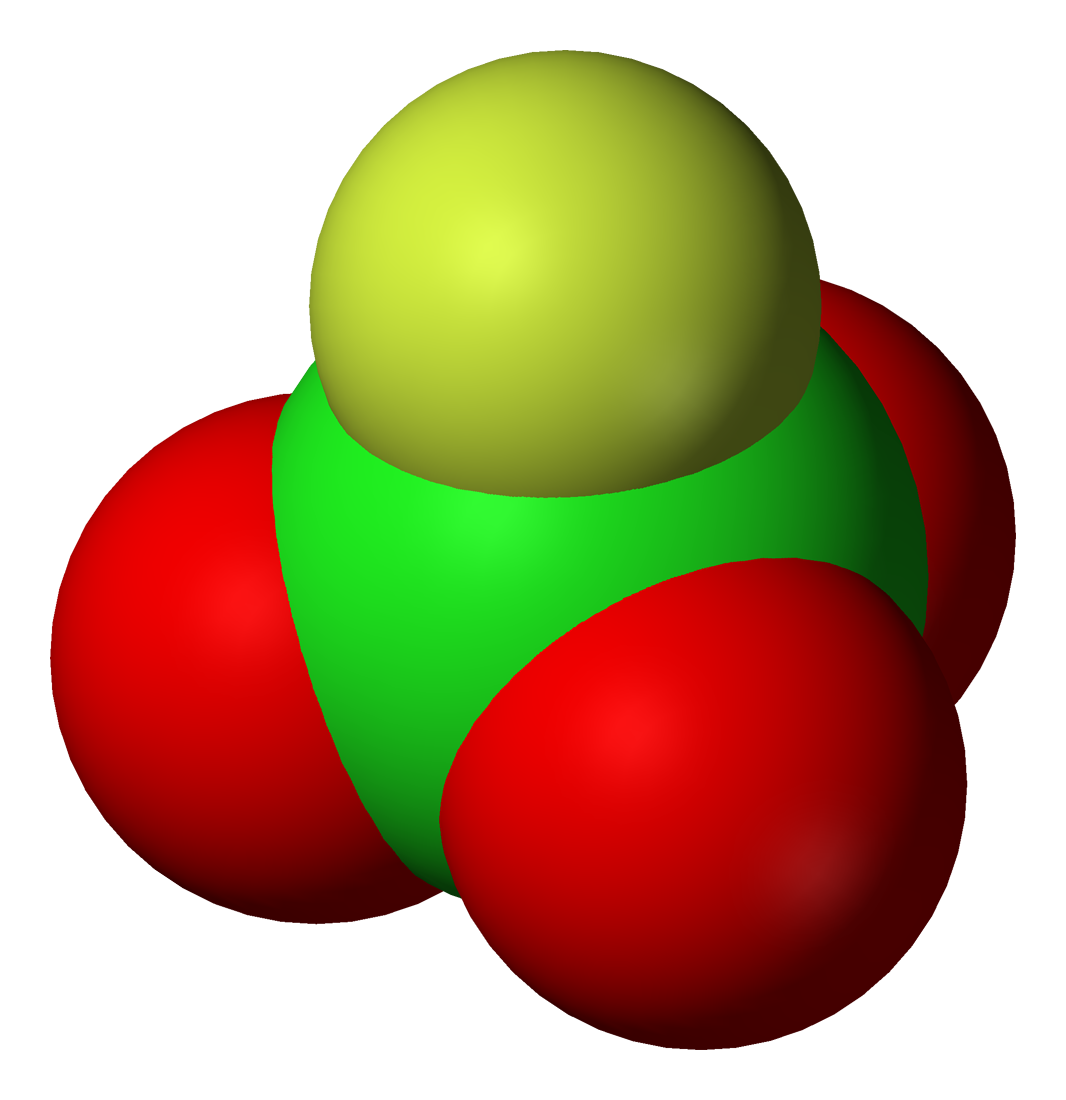

Names
- IUPAC name Perchloryl fluoride
- Other names: Chlorine oxyfluoride; Perchlorofluoride; Chlorine fluorine oxide; Trioxychlorofluoride; Perchloric acid fluoride

Identifiers
CAS Number	7616-94-6
3D model (JSmol)	Interactive image
ChemSpider	22680
ECHA InfoCard	100.028.660
EC Number	231-526-0
PubChem CID	24258
RTECS number	SD1925000
UNII	73NC8XM516
CompTox Dashboard (EPA)	DTXSID60894169
- InChI: InChI=1S/ClFO3/c2-1(3,4)5 Key: XHFXMNZYIKFCPN-UHFFFAOYSA-N; InChI=1/ClFO3/c2-1(3,4)5 Key: XHFXMNZYIKFCPN-UHFFFAOYAO
- SMILES: FCl(=O)(=O)=O

Properties
Chemical formula	ClO_{3}F
Molar mass	102.4496 g/mol
Appearance	Colorless gas
Odor	sweet odor
Density	1.434 g/cm^{3}
Melting point	−147.8 °C (−234.0 °F; 125.3 K)
Boiling point	−46.7 °C (−52.1 °F; 226.5 K)
Critical point (T, P)	95.2 °C (203.4 °F; 368.3 K), 53 standard atmospheres (5,400 kPa; 780 psi)
Solubility in water	0.06 g/(100 ml) (20 °C), slow hydrolysis
Vapor pressure	10.5 atm (20 °C)
Viscosity	3.91 × 10^{−3} Pa·s (@ melting point)

Structure
Molecular shape	Tetrahedral

Thermochemistry
Std molar entropy (S^{⦵}_{298})	278.97 J/(mol·K)
Std enthalpy of formation (Δ_{f}H^{⦵}_{298})	−21.42 kJ/mol

Hazards
- Occupational safety and health (OHS/OSH)
Main hazards	oxidizing, toxic. Non-corrosive.
NFPA 704 (fire diamond)	3 0 3 OX
Threshold limit value (TLV)	3 ppm
- Lethal dose or concentration (LD, LC)
LC_{50} (median concentration)	385 ppm (rat, 4 hr); 451 ppm (dog, 4 hr)
LC_{Lo} (lowest published)	2000 ppm (rat, 40 min); 451 ppm (dog, 4 hr)
- NIOSH (US health exposure limits)
PEL (Permissible)	TWA 3 ppm (13.5 mg/m^{3})
REL (Recommended)	TWA 3 ppm (14 mg/m^{3}) ST 6 ppm (28 mg/m^{3})
IDLH (Immediate danger)	100 ppm
- Except where otherwise noted, data are given for materials in their standard state (at 25 °C [77 °F], 100 kPa). verify (what is ?) Infobox references

Perchloryl fluoride is a reactive gas with the chemical formula ClO_{3}F. It has a characteristic sweet odor that resembles gasoline and kerosene. It is toxic and is a powerful oxidizing and fluorinating agent. It is the acid fluoride of perchloric acid.

In spite of its small enthalpy of formation (Δ_{f}H° = −5.2 kcal/mol (−22 kJ/mol)), it is kinetically stable, decomposing only at 400 °C. It is quite reactive towards reducing agents and anions, however, with the chlorine atom acting as an electrophile. It reacts explosively with reducing agents such as metal amides, metals, hydrides, etc. Its hydrolysis in water occurs very slowly, unlike that of chloryl fluoride.

== Synthesis and chemistry ==
Perchloryl fluoride is produced primarily by the fluorination of perchlorates. The initial syntheses in the early 1950s used fluorine gas or fluorides and anodic oxidation as the fluorinating agents, but these give explosive gaseous mixtures. A common fluorinator in modern syntheses is antimony pentafluoride:

ClO^{−}_{4} + 3 HF + 2 SbF_{5} → ClO_{3}F + [H_{3}O]^{+} + 2 [SbF_{6}]^{−}

Alternatively, potassium perchlorate reacts with excess fluorosulfuric acid to give potassium bisulfate and perchloryl fluoride:

KClO_{4} + HSO_{3}F → KHSO_{4} + FClO_{3}

ClO_{3}F reacts with alcohols to produce alkyl perchlorates, which are extremely shock-sensitive explosives. In the presence of a Lewis acid, it can be used for introducing the −ClO_{3} group into aromatic rings via electrophilic aromatic substitution.

== Applications ==
Perchloryl fluoride is used in organic chemistry as a mild fluorinating agent. It was the first industrially relevant electrophilic fluorinating agent, used since the 1960s for producing fluorinated steroids. In the presence of aluminum trichloride, it has also been used as an electrophilic perchlorylation reagent for aromatic compounds.

Perchloryl fluoride was investigated as a high performance liquid rocket fuel oxidizer. In comparison with chlorine pentafluoride and bromine pentafluoride, it has significantly lower specific impulse, but does not tend to corrode tanks. It does not require cryogenic storage. Rocket fuel chemist John Drury Clark reported in his book Ignition! that perchloryl fluoride is completely miscible with all-halogen oxidizers such as chlorine trifluoride and chlorine pentafluoride, and such a mixture provides the needed oxygen to properly burn carbon-containing fuels. It can also be used in flame photometry as an excitation source.

Perchloryl fluoride is a better dielectric gas than SF6 while having a reasonably low boiling point allowing for operation under wide ranges of conditions. However, its chemical reactivity (comparative to other gases) hindered practical utilization in such aspects.

== Safety ==
Perchloryl fluoride is toxic, with a TLV of 3 ppm. It is a strong lung- and eye-irritant capable of producing burns on exposed skin. Its IDLH level is 100 ppm. Symptoms of exposure include dizziness, headaches, syncope, and cyanosis. Exposure to toxic levels causes severe respiratory tract inflammation and pulmonary edema.

== See also ==
- Periodyl fluoride
- Perbromyl fluoride
