= Bromosyl trifluoride =

Names
- Other names: Bromine oxide trifluoride; Bromine(V) trifluoride oxide; Bromosyltrifluoride

Identifiers
CAS Number	61519-37-7
3D model (JSmol)	Interactive image
PubChem CID	21732508
- InChI: InChI=1S/BrF3O/c2-1(3,4)5 Key: VPGKBABVAVJLLQ-UHFFFAOYSA-N
- SMILES: O=Br(F)(F)F

Properties
Chemical formula	BrOF_{3}
Molar mass	152.898 g·mol^{−1}
Appearance	colorless liquid
Solubility in water	reacts

Related compounds
Related compounds	Chlorosyl trifluoride Iodosyl trifluoride
- Except where otherwise noted, data are given for materials in their standard state (at 25 °C [77 °F], 100 kPa). Infobox references

Bromosyl trifluoride is an inorganic compound of bromine, fluorine, and oxygen with the chemical formula BrOF_{3}.

== Synthesis ==
- Synthesis of bromosyl trifluoride is by reaction of anhydrous HF with K^{+}[BrOF_{4}]^{−} (potassium tetrafluorooxobromate(V)) at −78 °C, with potassium bifluoride as byproduct.

HF + K[BrOF_{4}] → BrOF_{3} + K[HF_{2}]

- Also it can be formed by a reaction of LiNO_{3} with BrF_{5}.

== Physical properties ==
Bromosyl trifluoride forms a colorless liquid at room temperature. It reacts with water.

== Chemical properties ==
Bromosyl trifluoride is quite unstable and decomposes to bromine trifluoride and molecular oxygen at room temperature:

2 BrOF_{3} → 2 BrF_{3} + O_{2}
