= Iodyl trifluoride =

Names
- Other names Iodine trifluoride dioxide

Identifiers
CAS Number	25402-50-0
3D model (JSmol)	Interactive image
- InChI: InChI=1S/F3IO2/c1-4(2,3,5)6 Key: IEYUHHXVKPWNHY-UHFFFAOYSA-N
- SMILES: F[I](=O)(=O)(F)F

Properties
Chemical formula	IO_{2}F_{3}
Molar mass	215.898 g·mol^{−1}
Appearance	yellow crystals
Melting point	41 °C (106 °F; 314 K)

Hazards
- Occupational safety and health (OHS/OSH)
Main hazards	ignites on contact with flammable organic substances

Related compounds
Related compounds	Iodosyl trifluoride Iodosyl pentafluoride
- Except where otherwise noted, data are given for materials in their standard state (at 25 °C [77 °F], 100 kPa). Infobox references

Iodyl trifluoride is an inorganic compound of iodine, fluorine, and oxygen with the chemical formula IO_{2}F_{3}. The compound was first obtained by Engelbrecht and Petersy in 1969.

== Synthesis ==
Iodyl trifluoride may be formed by the reaction of HO−IOF_{4} and oleum.

== Physical properties ==
Iodyl trifluoride forms yellow volatile crystals, which melt at 41 °C. Decomposes under direct sunlight or heating.

The molecules in the crystals are dimers. The compound is monomeric above 100 °C.

== Chemical properties ==
Iodyl trifluoride decomposes when heated:

2 IO_{2}F_{3} → 2 IOF_{3} + O_{2}
