= N-Chloropiperidine =

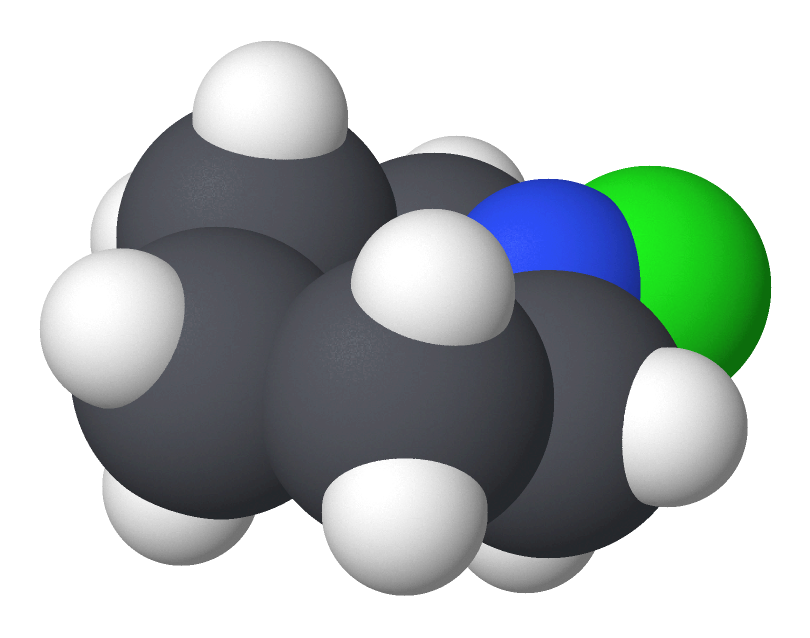

Names
- Preferred IUPAC name 1-Chloropiperidine

Identifiers
CAS Number	2156-71-0
3D model (JSmol)	Interactive image
ChemSpider	15680
PubChem CID	16540
UNII	4V5HK98PCN
CompTox Dashboard (EPA)	DTXSID10175894
- InChI: InChI=1S/C5H10ClN/c6-7-4-2-1-3-5-7/h1-5H2 Key: CIQJWKNJDQKPPO-UHFFFAOYSA-N
- SMILES: ClN1CCCCC1

Properties
Chemical formula	C_{5}H_{10}ClN
Molar mass	119.59 g·mol^{−1}
Appearance	Colorless liquid
Boiling point	50–60 °C (122–140 °F; 323–333 K) 40-50 mm Hg
- Except where otherwise noted, data are given for materials in their standard state (at 25 °C [77 °F], 100 kPa). Infobox references

N-Chloropiperidine is the organic compound with the formula C_{5}H_{10}NCl. A colorless liquid, it is a rare example of an organic chloramine, i.e. a compound with an N-Cl bond. It is prepared by treatment of piperidine with calcium hypochlorite. Typical of chloramines, the compound is so reactive that it is generated and used in situ rather than being isolated. The compound undergoes dehydrohalogenation to afford the cyclic imine.
