= Difluoramine =

Names
- IUPAC name Azonous difluoride

Identifiers
CAS Number	10405-27-3
3D model (JSmol)	Interactive image
ChemSpider	23575
PubChem CID	25242
CompTox Dashboard (EPA)	DTXSID00146230
- InChI: InChI=1S/F2HN/c1-3-2/h3H Key: ULFHSQLFQYTZLS-UHFFFAOYSA-N
- SMILES: N(F)F

Properties
Chemical formula	F_{2}HN
Molar mass	53.012 g·mol^{−1}

Related compounds
Related compounds	Nitrogen trifluoride; Fluoroamine; Chlorodifluoroamine
- Except where otherwise noted, data are given for materials in their standard state (at 25 °C [77 °F], 100 kPa). Infobox references

Difluoroamine (also called fluorimide or difluoramine) is an inorganic compound with the chemical formula NHF_{2}. It consists of an ammonia molecule on which two of the hydrogen atoms have been substituted by fluorine atoms, and is thus the fluorine analog of dichloramine.

== Synthesis ==
Difluoramine can be made by hydrolising N,N-difluorourea.

CH_{4}N_{2}O + 2 F_{2} → CH_{2}F_{2}N_{2}O + 2 HF

CH_{2}F_{2}N_{2}O + 2 HF + H_{2}O → HNF_{2} + CO_{2} + NH_{4}F•HF

It may also be produced in the reaction of tetrafluorohydrazine and thiophenol.

N_{2}F_{4} + 2 C_{6}H_{5}SH → 2 NHF_{2} + C_{6}H_{5}SSC_{6}H_{5}

It is produced in small amounts as a by product when nitrogen trifluoride is reduced by arsenic. Also it is a byproduct in the fluorination of urea. Small amounts are produced when ammonium hydrogen difluoride is electrolysed.
