= Chloryl trifluoride =

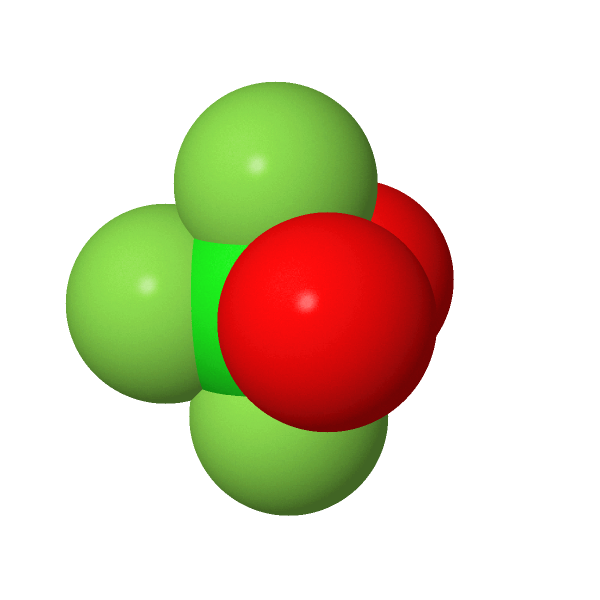

Names
- Other names Chlorine trifluoride dioxide, chlorine dioxytrifluoride, trifluorodioxychlorine

Identifiers
| CAS Number | 38680-84-1 |
| 3D model (JSmol) | Interactive image |
- InChI: InChI=1S/ClF3O2/c2-1(3,4,5)6 Key: JTEAZAJBVCLGDO-UHFFFAOYSA-N
- SMILES: O=[Cl](F)(F)(F)=O

Properties
| Chemical formula | ClF_{3}O_{2} |
| Molar mass | 124.44 g·mol^{−1} |
| Appearance | colorless gas |
| Density | 5.087 g/L |
| Melting point | −81 °C (−114 °F; 192 K) |
| Boiling point | −22 °C (−8 °F; 251 K) |
| Solubility in water | reacts with water |

Related compounds
| Related compounds | Iodyl trifluoride Bromyl trifluoride |
- Except where otherwise noted, data are given for materials in their standard state (at 25 °C [77 °F], 100 kPa). Infobox references

Chloryl trifluoride is an inorganic compound of chlorine, fluorine, and oxygen with the chemical formula ClO_{2}F_{3}.

== Synthesis ==
Synthesis of chloryl trifluoride can be by a reaction of chlorine monofluoride with dioxygen difluoride:

ClF + O_{2}F_{2} → ClO_{2}F_{3}

Alternatively it can be made by a reaction of chlorine trifluoride with oxygen gas:

ClF_{3} + O_{2} → ClO_{2}F_{3}

== Physical properties ==
Chloryl trifluoride is a colorless gas at standard conditions.

== Chemical properties ==
ClO_{2}F_{3} reacts with water.
