= Chlorodifluoroamine =

- Skeletal formula of nitrosyl iodide

Names
- IUPAC names Chloro(difluoro)amine; Nitrogen chloride difluoride
- Other names Difluorochloroamine, chlorodifluoroammonia, chlorodifluoroazane

Identifiers
CAS Number	13637-87-1
3D model (JSmol)	Interactive image
ChEBI	CHEBI:37383
ChemSpider	123045
Gmelin Reference	259733
PubChem CID	139524
CompTox Dashboard (EPA)	DTXSID10159770
- InChI: InChI=1S/ClF2N/c1-4(2)3 Key: ZIOUHCMXEAFYSA-UHFFFAOYSA-N
- SMILES: N(F)(F)Cl

Properties
Chemical formula	ClF_{2}N
Molar mass	87.45 g·mol^{−1}
Appearance	colorless gas
Melting point	−190 °C (−310.0 °F; 83.1 K)
Boiling point	−66 °C (−87 °F; 207 K)
Solubility in water	reacts with water

Related compounds
Related compounds	Monochloramine; Fluoroamine; Difluoramine
- Except where otherwise noted, data are given for materials in their standard state (at 25 °C [77 °F], 100 kPa). Infobox references

Chlorodifluoroamine is an inorganic chemical compound of nitrogen, chlorine, and fluorine with the molecular formula NClF_{2}.

== Synthesis ==
Chlorodifluoroamine can be synthesized by the effect of fluorine on sodium azide in the presence of sodium chloride:

2 F_{2} + NaN_{3} + NaCl → NClF_{2} + 2 NaF + N_{2}

The effect of fluorine and chlorine on sodium azide also forms the compound:

3 F_{2} + Cl_{2} + 2 NaN_{3} → 2 NClF_{2} + 2 NaF + 2 N_{2}

Also, the reaction of ammonium chloride with fluorine makes it:

NH_{4}Cl + 3 F_{2} → NF_{2}Cl + 4 HF

Other methods of synthesis are also known.

== Physical properties ==
The compound forms a colorless air-stable gas that decomposes when heated (sometimes with an explosion).

== Chemical properties ==
The compound decomposes in several ways when heated:

2 NClF_{2} → N_{2}F_{2} + Cl_{2}
6 NClF_{2} → 4 NF_{3} + N_{2} + 3 Cl_{2}
