= Nitrogen trichloride =

Chemical compound

- Structural formula of nitrogen trichloride

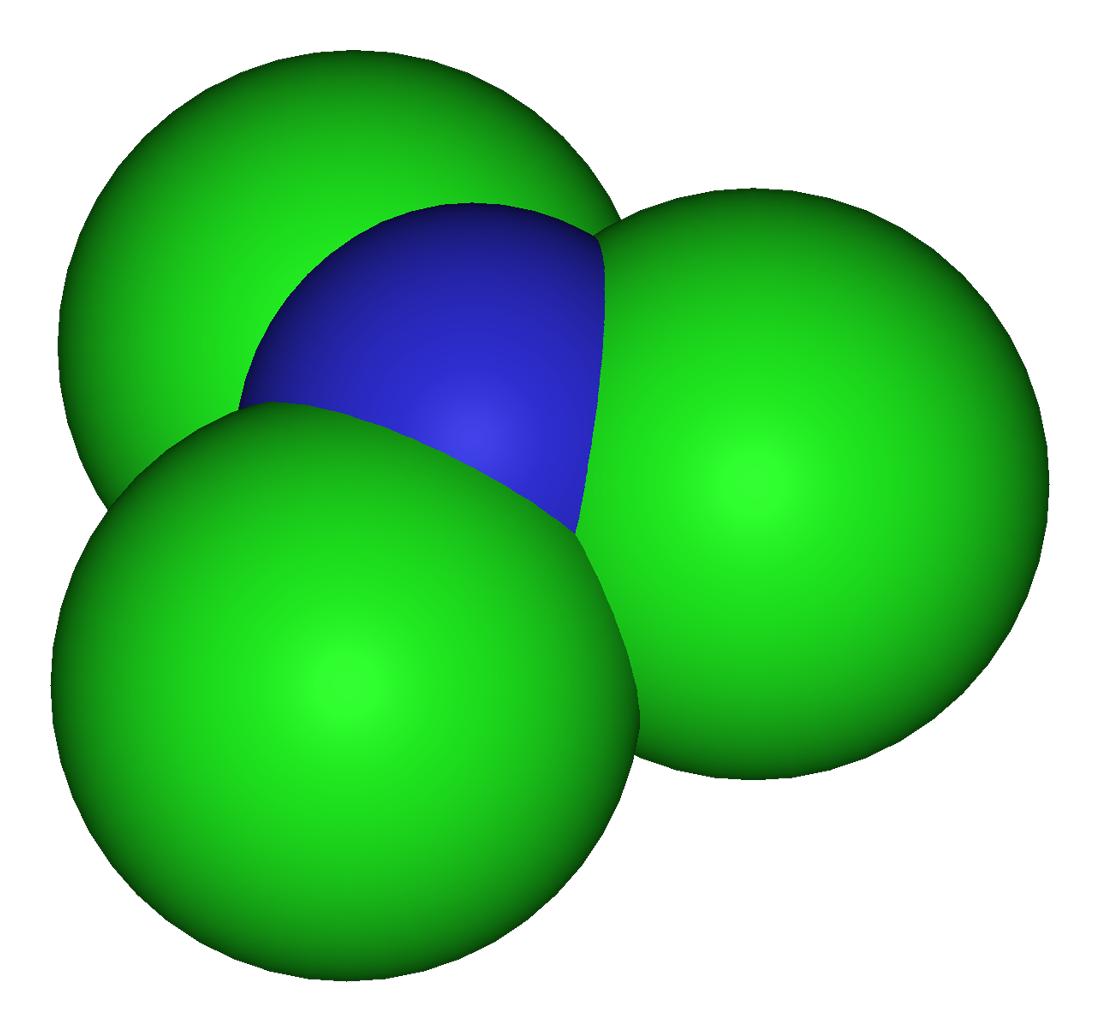
- Space-filling model of nitrogen trichloride Nitrogen, N Chlorine, Cl

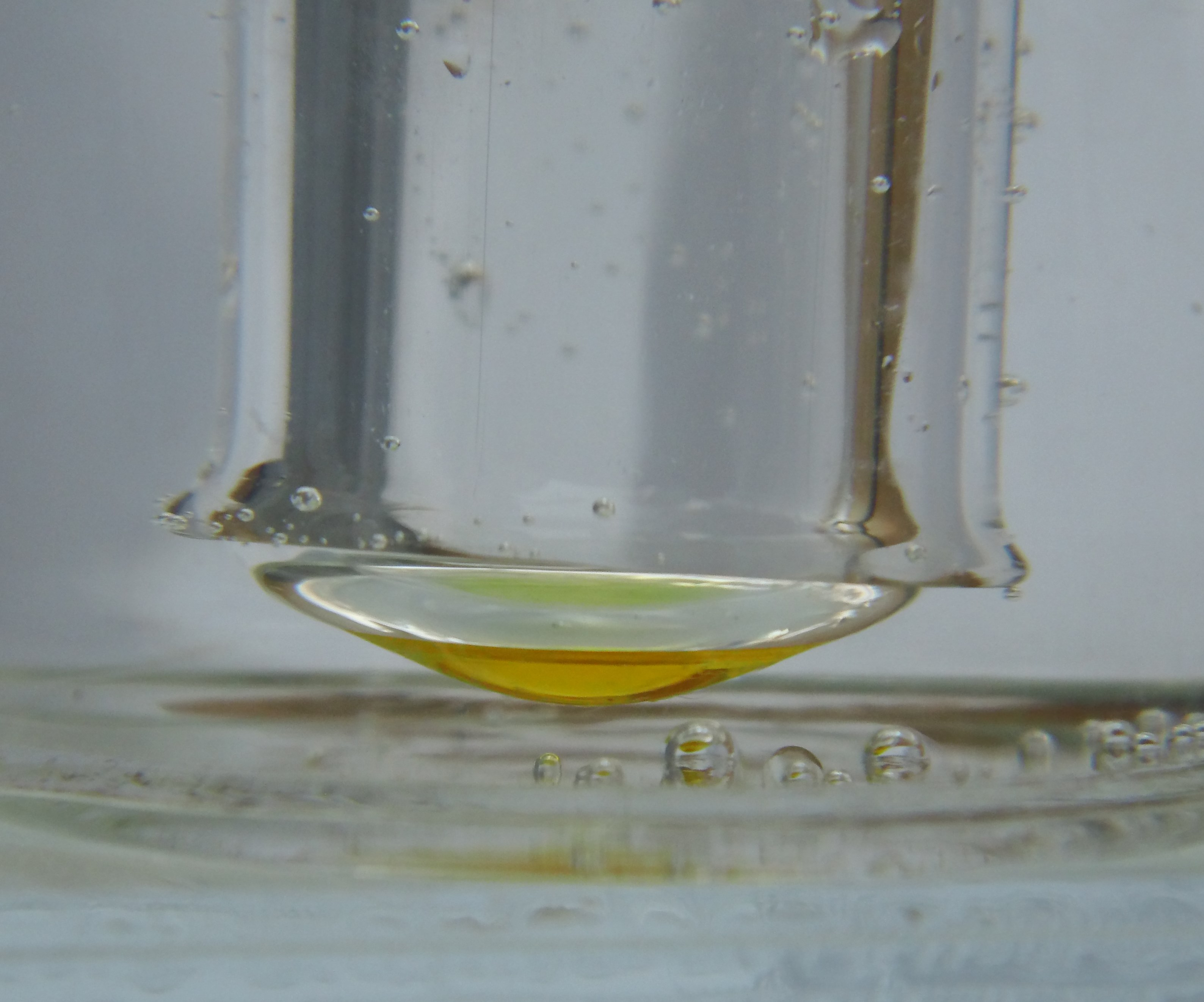
- Nitrogen trichloride

Names
- Other names Trichloramine; Agene; Nitrogen(III) chloride Trichloroazane; Trichlorine nitride

Identifiers
CAS Number	10025-85-1
3D model (JSmol)	Interactive image
ChEBI	CHEBI:37382
ChemSpider	55361
ECHA InfoCard	100.030.029
EC Number	233-045-1
Gmelin Reference	1840
PubChem CID	61437
RTECS number	QW974000
UNII	VA681HRW8W
CompTox Dashboard (EPA)	DTXSID4074938
- InChI: InChI=1S/Cl3N/c1-4(2)3 Key: QEHKBHWEUPXBCW-UHFFFAOYSA-N; InChI=1/Cl3N/c1-4(2)3 Key: QEHKBHWEUPXBCW-UHFFFAOYAZ
- SMILES: ClN(Cl)Cl

Properties
Chemical formula	NCl_{3}
Molar mass	120.36 g·mol^{−1}
Appearance	yellow oily liquid
Odor	chlorine-like
Density	1.653 g/mL
Melting point	−40 °C (−40 °F; 233 K)
Boiling point	71 °C (160 °F; 344 K)
Solubility in water	immiscible slowly decomposes
Solubility	soluble in benzene, chloroform, CCl_{4}, CS_{2}, PCl_{3}

Structure
Crystal structure	orthorhombic (below −40 °C)
Molecular shape	trigonal pyramidal
Dipole moment	0.6 D

Thermochemistry
Std enthalpy of formation (Δ_{f}H^{⦵}_{298})	232 kJ/mol

Hazards
NFPA 704 (fire diamond)	2 0 3 OX
Autoignition temperature	93 °C (199 °F; 366 K)

Related compounds
Other anions	Nitrogen trifluoride Nitrogen tribromide Nitrogen triiodide
Other cations	Phosphorus trichloride Arsenic trichloride
Related chloramines	Monochloramine; Dichloramine
Related compounds	Nitrosyl chloride
- Except where otherwise noted, data are given for materials in their standard state (at 25 °C [77 °F], 100 kPa). verify (what is ?) Infobox references

Nitrogen trichloride, also known as trichloramine, is the chemical compound with the formula NCl_{3}. This yellow, oily, and explosive liquid is most commonly encountered as a product of chemical reactions between ammonia-derivatives and chlorine (for example, in swimming pools). Alongside monochloramine and dichloramine, trichloramine is responsible for the distinctive 'chlorine smell' associated with swimming pools, where the compound is readily formed as a product from hypochlorous acid reacting with ammonia and other nitrogenous substances in the water, such as urea from urine.

== Preparation and occurrence ==
The compound is generated by treatment of ammonium chloride with calcium hypochlorite. When prepared in an aqueous-dichloromethane mixture, the trichloramine is extracted into the nonaqueous phase. Intermediates in this conversion include monochloramine and dichloramine, NH_{2}Cl and NHCl_{2}, respectively.

Nitrogen trichloride, trademarked as Agene, was at one time used to bleach flour, but this practice was banned in the United States in 1949 due to safety concerns.

== Structure and properties ==
Like ammonia, NCl_{3} is a pyramidal molecule. The N–Cl distances are 1.42 Å, and the Cl–N–Cl angles are 107°.

Nitrogen trichloride can form in small amounts when public water supplies are disinfected with monochloramine. It can also form in swimming pools by disinfecting chlorine reacting with urea in urine and sweat from bathers:

$$\ce{6 HClO + CO(NH2)2 -> CO2 + 5 H2O + 2 NCl3}$$

== Reactions and uses ==
The chemistry of NCl_{3} has been well explored. It is moderately polar with a dipole moment of 0.6 D. The nitrogen center is basic but much less so than ammonia. It is hydrolyzed by hot water to release ammonia and hypochlorous acid.

$$\ce{NCl3 + 3 H2O -> NH3 + 3 HOCl}$$

Concentrated samples of NCl_{3} can explode to give N_{2} and chlorine gas.

$$\ce{2NCl3 -> N2 + 3Cl2}$$

In the presence of aluminium trichloride, NCl_{3} reacts with some branched hydrocarbons to produce, after a hydrolysis step, amines.

== Safety ==
Nitrogen trichloride can irritate mucous membranes — it is a lachrymatory agent, but has never been used as such. The compound (rarely encountered) is a dangerous explosive, being sensitive to light, heat, even moderate shock, and organic compounds. Pierre Louis Dulong first prepared it in 1812, and lost several fingers and an eye in two explosions. In 1813, an NCl_{3} explosion blinded Sir Humphry Davy temporarily, inducing him to hire Michael Faraday as a co-worker. They were both injured in another NCl_{3} explosion shortly thereafter.

== See also ==
- List of food contamination incidents
- Nitrogen tribromide
- Nitrogen triiodide
