= N-Formylpiperidine =

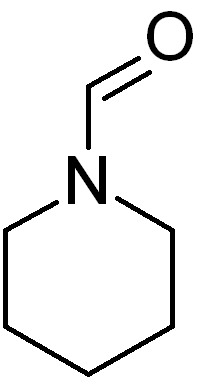
- Skeletal formula of N-formylpiperidine

Names
- Preferred IUPAC name Piperidine-1-carbaldehyde
- Other names 1-Formylpiperidine

Identifiers
CAS Number	2591-86-8
3D model (JSmol)	Interactive image
Beilstein Reference	107697
ChemSpider	16486
DrugBank	DB04113
ECHA InfoCard	100.018.170
EC Number	219-986-0
MeSH	N-Formylpiperidine
PubChem CID	17429
RTECS number	TN0380000
UNII	ZIQ29H6CZG
UN number	2810
CompTox Dashboard (EPA)	DTXSID8043941
- InChI: InChI=1S/C6H11NO/c8-6-7-4-2-1-3-5-7/h6H,1-5H2 Key: FEWLNYSYJNLUOO-UHFFFAOYSA-N; InChI=1/C6H11NO/c8-6-7-4-2-1-3-5-7/h6H,1-5H2 Key: FEWLNYSYJNLUOO-UHFFFAOYAJ
- SMILES: O=CN1CCCCC1

Properties
Chemical formula	C_{6}H_{11}NO
Molar mass	113.160 g·mol^{−1}
Density	1.019 g cm^{−3}
Boiling point	222 °C (432 °F; 495 K)
Vapor pressure	0.01 kPa

Hazards
- GHS labelling
Pictograms	(GHS06: Toxic) (GHS07: Exclamation mark)
Signal word	Danger
Hazard statements	H302, H311, H315, H319, H335
Precautionary statements	P261, P264, P270, P271, P280, P301+P312, P302+P352, P304+P340, P305+P351+P338, P312, P321, P322, P330, P332+P313, P337+P313, P361, P362, P363, P403+P233, P405, P501
NFPA 704 (fire diamond)	2 1 0
Flash point	102 °C (216 °F; 375 K)
- Except where otherwise noted, data are given for materials in their standard state (at 25 °C [77 °F], 100 kPa). verify (what is ?) Infobox references

N-Formylpiperidine is an organic compound with the formula (CH_{2})_{5}NCHO. It is the amide of formic acid and piperidine. It can be used as a polar aprotic solvent, with better hydrocarbon solubility than other amide solvents such as dimethylformamide (DMF). It has also been used to transfer the formyl group to a Grignard reagent, for example phenethylmagnesium chloride:

Ph(CH_{2})_{2}MgCl + (CH_{2})_{5}NCHO → Ph(CH_{2})_{2}CHO + (CH_{2})_{5}NMgCl

In some formylation reactions of alkyllithium compounds, N-formylpiperidine gives higher yields than DMF.
