= 1-Methylpiperidine =

Names
- Preferred IUPAC name 1-Methylpiperidine
- Other names N-methylpiperidine

Identifiers
CAS Number	626-67-5
3D model (JSmol)	Interactive image
ChEMBL	ChEMBL281417
ChemSpider	11788
ECHA InfoCard	100.009.964
EC Number	210-959-9
IUPHAR/BPS	5522
PubChem CID	12291
UNII	617374QZN4
UN number	2399
CompTox Dashboard (EPA)	DTXSID8060822
- InChI: InChI=1S/C6H13N/c1-7-5-3-2-4-6-7/h2-6H2,1H3 Key: PAMIQIKDUOTOBW-UHFFFAOYSA-N
- SMILES: CN1CCCCC1

Properties
Chemical formula	C_{6}H_{13}N
Molar mass	99.18 g·mol^{−1}
Density	0.82 g·cm^{−3} (20 °C)

Hazards
- GHS labelling
Pictograms	(GHS02: Flammable) (GHS05: Corrosive) (GHS06: Toxic) (GHS07: Exclamation mark)
Signal word	Danger
Hazard statements	H225, H301, H302, H311, H312, H314, H331, H412
Precautionary statements	P210, P233, P240, P241, P242, P243, P260, P262, P264, P264+P265, P270, P271, P273, P280, P301+P316, P301+P317, P301+P330+P331, P302+P352, P302+P361+P354, P303+P361+P353, P304+P340, P305+P354+P338, P316, P317, P321, P330, P361+P364, P362+P364, P363, P370+P378, P403+P233, P403+P235, P405, P501
- Except where otherwise noted, data are given for materials in their standard state (at 25 °C [77 °F], 100 kPa). Infobox references

1-Methylpiperidine (IUPAC nomenclature) is an organic chemical compound belonging to the group of cyclic compounds and tertiary amines. The compound serves as a starting material for organic syntheses and for the production of catalyst systems.

== Extraction and preparation ==
For the industrial production of 1-methylpiperidine, 5-amino-1-pentanol is reacted with methanol at 180–230 °C and 70–120 bar in the presence of an aluminum oxide-supported copper oxide catalyst.

The reaction is performed in the liquid phase in a continuous tubular or multi-tubular reactor. The catalyst is arranged as a fixed bed reactor, through which the reaction mixture can flow from either below or above. The product is purified by multistage distillation.

== Properties ==
=== Physical properties ===
1-Methylpiperidine has a relative density of 3.42 (density ratio to dry air at the same temperature and pressure) and a relative density of the vapor–air mixture of 1.10 (density ratio to dry air at 20 °C and under standard conditions). The dynamic viscosity at 20 °C is 5 mPa·s.

=== Chemical properties ===
1-Methylpiperidine is a highly flammable, colorless liquid with an amine-like odor. The compound belongs to the class of cyclic, tertiary amines and can also be considered a heterocyclic compound. N-Methylpiperidine is miscible with water and exhibits strong reactivity as an aqueous alkaline solution. At 20 °C, an aqueous solution of the compound (concentration: 100 g/l) has a pH value of 12. Violent reactions may occur with acids and oxidizing agents.

== Use ==
1-Methylpiperidine is used, among other applications, as an intermediate in the production of the growth regulator mepiquat chloride. It is also used as a solvent and in the synthesis of other chemicals. Furthermore, 1-methylpiperidine serves as a reagent for the synthesis of catalyst systems based on ruthenium. It is also employed in the preparation of antibacterial imidazoleium, pyrroleidinium and piperidine salts.

== Safety information ==
The vapors of 1-methylpiperidine form explosive mixtures with air. The substance is primarily absorbed via the respiratory tract. Significant absorption through the skin is also suspected. Ingestion or exposure causes acute irritation of the mucous membrane of the eye, the respiratory tract, and the skin. No chronic data are available for humans. Reproductive toxicity could not be demonstrated in animal studies, but no corresponding human data exist. No detailed information is available on mutagenicity or carcinogenicity. 1-Methylpiperidine has a lower explosion limit (LEL) of 1.1 % by volume and an upper explosion limit (OEL) of 9.9 % by volume. The ignition temperature is 205 °C, placing the substance in temperature class T3. With a flash point of 3 °C, 1-methylpiperidine is considered highly flammable. The compound is also classified as highly hazardous to the aquatic environment.
