= Perfluoromethyldiethylamine =

Names
- Preferred IUPAC name 1,1,2,2,2-Pentafluoro-N-(pentafluoroethyl)-N-(trifluoromethyl)ethan-1-amine
- Other names 1,1,2,2,2-Pentafluoro-N-(perfluoroethyl)-N-(trifluoromethyl)ethan-1-amine

Identifiers
CAS Number	758-48-5
3D model (JSmol)	Interactive image
ChemSpider	120339
PubChem CID	136571
UNII	QZ8LSG9H5L
CompTox Dashboard (EPA)	DTXSID10226714
- InChI: InChI=1S/C5F13N/c6-1(7,8)3(12,13)19(5(16,17)18)4(14,15)2(9,10)11 Key: KMPITNDOTGKQSE-UHFFFAOYSA-N
- SMILES: C(C(F)(F)F)(N(C(C(F)(F)F)(F)F)C(F)(F)F)(F)F

Properties
Chemical formula	C_{5}F_{13}N
Molar mass	321.041 g·mol^{−1}
Melting point	−123.0 °C; −189.5 °F; 150.1 K
- Except where otherwise noted, data are given for materials in their standard state (at 25 °C [77 °F], 100 kPa). Infobox references

Perfluoromethyldiethylamine is a tertiary perfluorinated amine with the chemical formula C_{5}F_{13}N. The compound consists of two pentafluoroethyl and one trifluoromethyl groups connected to nitrogen. The compound is produced for the electronics industry, along with other perfluoroalkylamines. Unlike ordinary amines, perfluoroamines are nonbasic.

== Preparation and use ==
Perfluoroalkylamines are prepared by electrofluorination of the parent amine using hydrogen fluoride as solvent and source of fluorine. The compound has two commercial uses, although details are often proprietary. It is a component in Fluosol, artificial blood. This application exploits the high solubility of oxygen and carbon dioxide in the solvent, as well as the low viscosity and toxicity. It is also a component of Fluorinert coolant liquids. CPUs of some computers are immersed in this liquid to facilitate cooling.

== Safety ==
Perfluoroalkyl amines are generally of very low toxicity, so much that they have been evaluated as synthetic blood.
