= Agene process =

Process for bleaching flour

The agene process is a former process for bleaching flour with agene (nitrogen trichloride). The practice was discontinued in 1949 once it became known that agene treated flour caused severe and widespread neurological disorders in humans and dogs.

British nutrition scientist and biochemist Sir Edward Mellanby was the first to publish research identifying the agene process as harmful with his 1946 paper, Diet and Canine Hysteria: Experimental Production by Treated Flour. Six months after Mellanby's paper was published, American writer James Rorty published an article in the New York University Law Review called Bleached Flour Gives Dogs Fits But It's Still Sold to Consumers, in which he criticized the continued use of the agene process to whiten and preserve flour for human consumption.

By some estimates, up to 80% of the flour produced from the early 20th century until 1949 in the United Kingdom was made using this process.
