= Dichloramine =

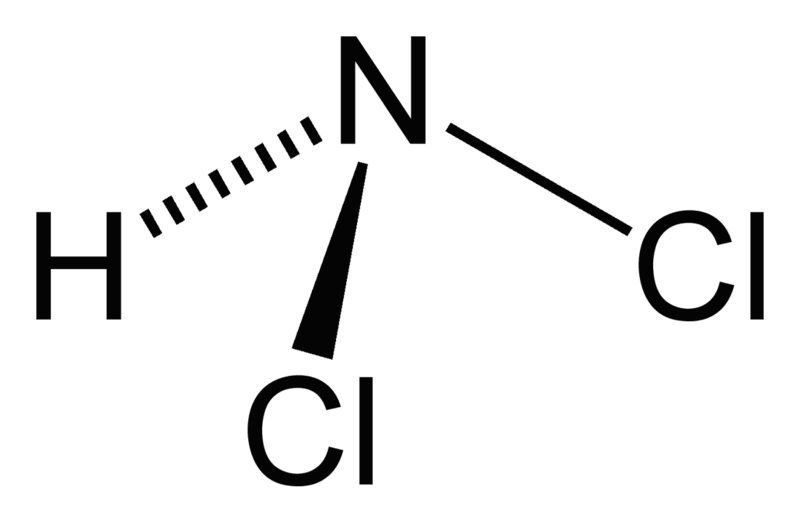

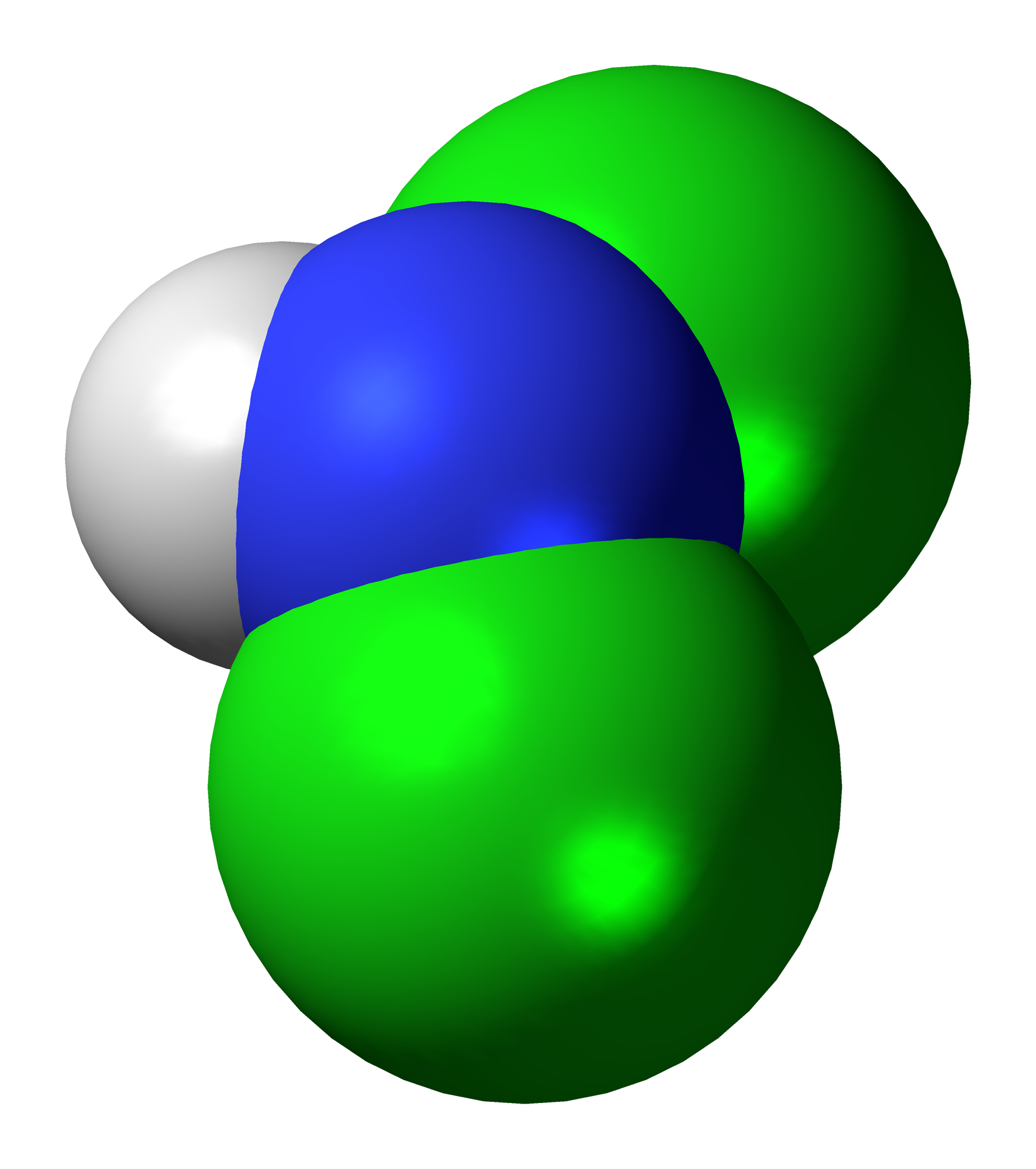
- Hydrogen, H Nitrogen, N Chlorine, Cl

Names
- IUPAC name Azonous dichloride
- Other names Chlorimide

Identifiers
| CAS Number | 3400-09-7 |
| 3D model (JSmol) | Interactive image |
| ChemSpider | 69389 |
| PubChem CID | 76939 |
| UNII | KGU33GRT44 |
| CompTox Dashboard (EPA) | DTXSID4074936 |
- InChI: InChI=1S/Cl2HN/c1-3-2/h3H Key: JSYGRUBHOCKMGQ-UHFFFAOYSA-N; InChI=1/Cl2HN/c1-3-2/h3H Key: JSYGRUBHOCKMGQ-UHFFFAOYAB
- SMILES: ClNCl

Properties
| Chemical formula | NHCl_{2} |
| Molar mass | 85.92 g·mol^{−1} |
| Appearance | yellow gas |

Related compounds
| Related compounds | Ammonia; Monochloramine; Nitrogen trichloride |
- Except where otherwise noted, data are given for materials in their standard state (at 25 °C [77 °F], 100 kPa). verify (what is ?) Infobox references

Dichloramine (IUPAC name: Azonous dichloride) is a reactive inorganic compound with the chemical formula NHCl_{2}. It is one of the three chloramines of ammonia, the others being monochloramine (NH_{2}Cl) and nitrogen trichloride (NCl_{3}). This yellow gas is unstable and reacts with many materials. It is formed by a reaction between ammonia and chlorine or sodium hypochlorite. It is a byproduct formed during the synthesis of monochloramine and nitrogen trichloride.

== Synthesis ==
Dichloramine can be prepared by a reaction between monochloramine and chlorine or sodium hypochlorite, which forms hydrogen chloride as a byproduct:

NH_{2}Cl + Cl_{2} → NHCl_{2} + HCl

It also occurs as a reaction between urea in urine and hypochlorite:

4 HClO + CO(NH_{2})_{2} → CO_{2} + 3 H_{2}O + 2 NHCl_{2}

== Reactions ==
Dichloramine reacts with the hydroxide ion, which can be present in water or comes from water molecules, to yield nitroxyl and the chloride ion.
