= Iodosyl pentafluoride =

Names
- Other names Iodine oxide pentafluoride, iodosylpentafluoride

Identifiers
CAS Number	16056-61-4
3D model (JSmol)	Interactive image
PubChem CID	23237529
- InChI: InChI=1S/F5IO/c1-6(2,3,4,5)7 Key: CVIVTNSVCYWLHI-UHFFFAOYSA-N
- SMILES: F[I](=O)(F)(F)(F)F

Properties
Chemical formula	IOF_{5}
Molar mass	237.895 g·mol^{−1}
Appearance	colorless liquid
Melting point	4.5 °C (40.1 °F; 277.6 K)

Related compounds
Related compounds	Iodosyl trifluoride
- Except where otherwise noted, data are given for materials in their standard state (at 25 °C [77 °F], 100 kPa). Infobox references

Iodosyl pentafluoride is an inorganic compound of iodine, fluorine, and oxygen with the chemical formula IOF_{5}.

== Synthesis ==
- Reaction of iodine heptafluoride with water:

IF_{7} + H_{2}O → IOF_{5} + 2 HF

- Reaction of iodine heptafluoride with silicon dioxide:

2 IF_{7} + SiO_{2} → 2 IOF_{5} + SiF_{4}

== Physical properties ==
Iodosyl pentafluoride forms a colorless liquid. The molecule of IOF_{5} is a distorted octahedron O=I(F_{4})−F. Its melting point 4.5 °C.

== Chemical properties ==
The compound reacts with graphite to form a black graphite intercalation compound. Iodosyl pentafluoride also forms adducts with arsenic pentafluoride and antimony pentafluoride.
