= Iodosyl trifluoride =

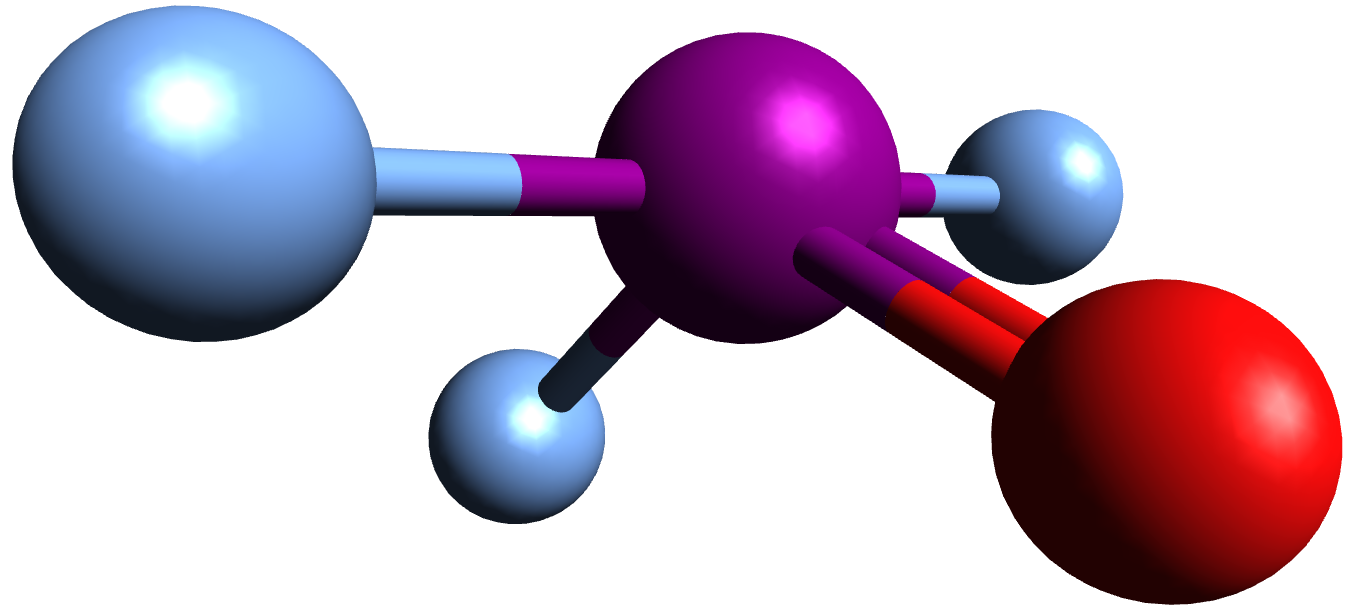

Names
- Other names: Iodine oxide trifluoride; Iodosyltrifluoride; Iodine oxytrifluoride

Identifiers
CAS Number	19058-78-7
3D model (JSmol)	Interactive image
PubChem CID	23236028
- InChI: InChI=1S/F3IO/c1-4(2,3)5 Key: SAHIKKKGOUDBAW-UHFFFAOYSA-N
- SMILES: F[I](=O)(F)F

Properties
Chemical formula	IOF_{3}
Molar mass	199.899 g·mol^{−1}
Appearance	colorless needles
Density	3.95 g/cm^{3}

Related compounds
Related compounds	Chlorosyl trifluoride; Iodosyl pentafluoride; Bromosyl trifluoride; Iodyl fluoride
- Except where otherwise noted, data are given for materials in their standard state (at 25 °C [77 °F], 100 kPa). Infobox references

Iodosyl trifluoride is an inorganic compound of iodine, fluorine, and oxygen with the chemical formula IOF_{3}.

== Synthesis ==
Synthesis of iodosyl trifluoride can be done by a reaction of iodine pentoxide with iodine pentafluoride.

I_{2}O_{5} + 3 IF_{5} → 5 IOF_{3}

Synthesis can be by a reaction of gases:

I_{2} + O_{2} + 3 F_{2} → 2 IOF_{3}

Or alternately by reaction of iodine pentafluoride with water:

IF_{5} + H_{2}O → IOF_{3} + 2 HF

== Physical properties ==
Iodosyl trifluoride forms hygroscopic colorless needles. Reacts with water.

== Chemical properties ==
Iodosyl trifluoride is hygroscopic and decomposes into IO_{2}F and IF_{5} at 110 °C (230 °F).
