= Monochloramine =

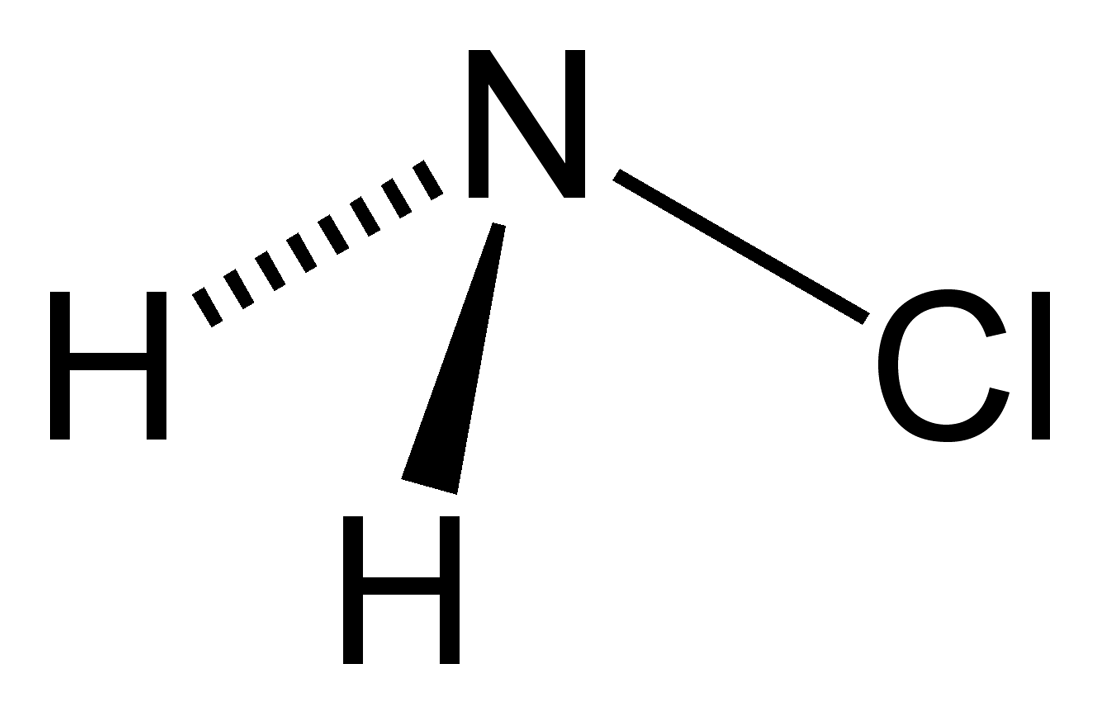
- Stereo, skeletal formula of chloramine with all explicit hydrogens added

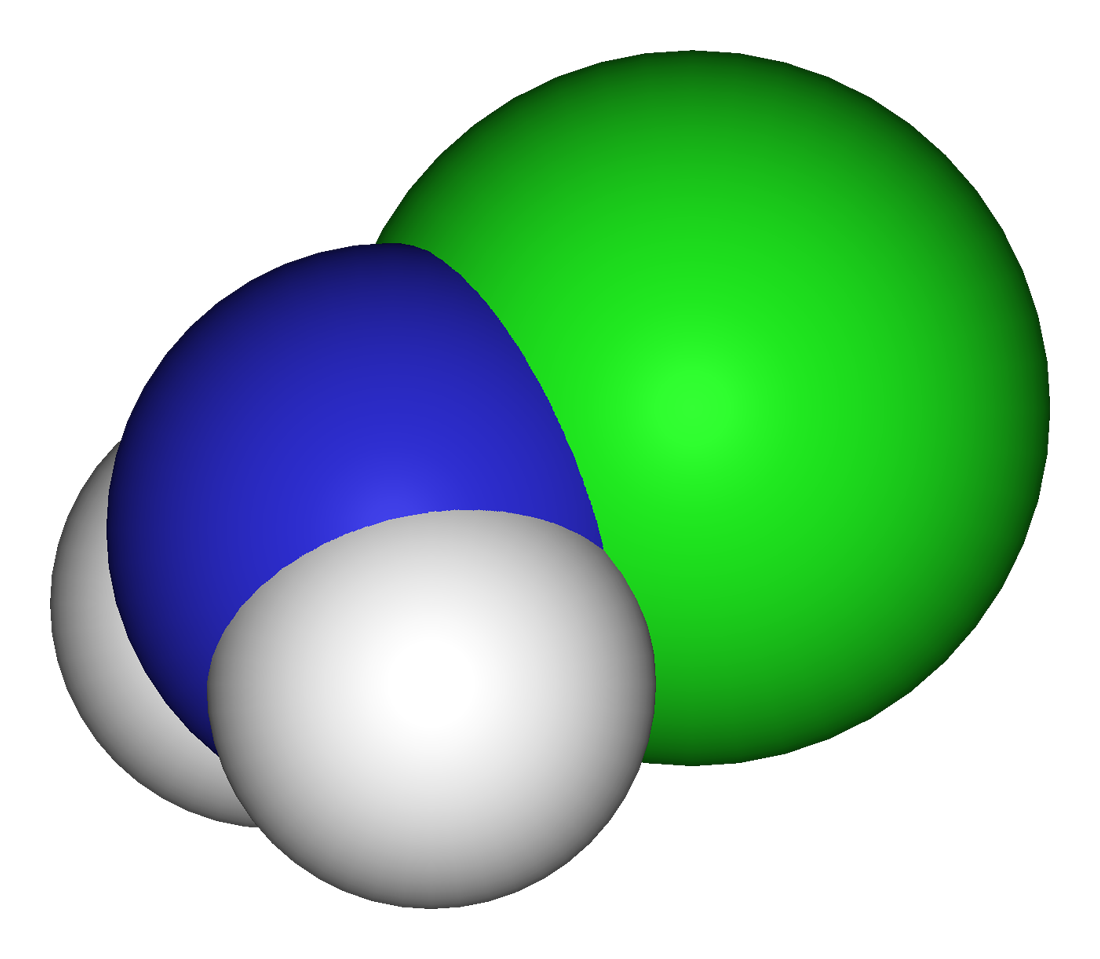
- Spacefill model of chloramine Hydrogen, H Nitrogen, N Chlorine, Cl

Names
- Other names: Chloramine; Chloramide

Identifiers
CAS Number	10599-90-3
3D model (JSmol)	Interactive image
ChEBI	CHEBI:82415
ChEMBL	ChEMBL1162370
ChemSpider	23735
ECHA InfoCard	100.031.095
EC Number	234-217-9
KEGG	C19359
MeSH	chloramine
PubChem CID	25423
UNII	KW8K411A1P
UN number	3093
CompTox Dashboard (EPA)	DTXSID8023842
- InChI: InChI=1S/ClH2N/c1-2/h2H2 Key: QDHHCQZDFGDHMP-UHFFFAOYSA-N
- SMILES: NCl

Properties
Chemical formula	NH_{2}Cl
Molar mass	51.476 g mol^{−1}
Appearance	Colorless gas
Melting point	−66 °C (−87 °F; 207 K)
Acidity (pK_{a})	14
Basicity (pK_{b})	15

Hazards
- Occupational safety and health (OHS/OSH)
Main hazards	Corrosive acid
Ingestion hazards	Corrosive; nausea and vomiting
Inhalation hazards	Corrosive
Eye hazards	Irritation
Skin hazards	Irritation
- GHS labelling
Pictograms	(GHS07: Exclamation mark) (GHS08: Health hazard) (GHS05: Corrosive)
Signal word	Danger
Hazard statements	H290, H314, H315, H319, H335, H372, H412
Precautionary statements	P234, P260, P264, P270, P271, P273, P280, P301+P330+P331, P302+P352, P303+P361+P353, P304+P340, P305+P351+P338, P310, P312, P314, P321, P332+P313, P337+P313, P362, P363, P390, P403+P233, P404, P405, P501
NFPA 704 (fire diamond)	3 1 1 ACID
- Lethal dose or concentration (LD, LC)
LD_{50} (median dose)	935 mg/kg (rat, oral)

Related compounds
Related compounds	Ammonia; Dichloramine; Nitrogen trichloride; Fluoroamine; Chlorodifluoroamine
- Except where otherwise noted, data are given for materials in their standard state (at 25 °C [77 °F], 100 kPa). verify (what is ?) Infobox references

Monochloramine, often called chloramine, is the chemical compound with the formula NH_{2}Cl. Together with dichloramine (NHCl_{2}) and nitrogen trichloride (NCl_{3}), it is one of the three chloramines of ammonia. It is a colorless liquid at its melting point of −66 °C (−87 °F), but it is usually handled as a dilute aqueous solution, and it is sometimes used as a disinfectant in this form. Chloramine is too unstable to have its boiling point measured.

== Water treatment ==
Chloramine is used as a disinfectant for water. It is less aggressive than chlorine and more stable against light than hypochlorites.

=== Drinking water disinfection ===
Chloramine is increasingly used in low concentrations as a secondary disinfectant in municipal water distribution systems as an alternative to chlorination, as monochloramine is much less reactive and does not dissipate as rapidly as elemental chlorine (referred to in water treatment as free chlorine). Chloramine also has a much lower, but still active, tendency than free chlorine to convert organic materials into chlorocarbons such as chloroform and carbon tetrachloride. Such compounds have been identified as carcinogens and in 1979 the United States Environmental Protection Agency (EPA) began regulating their levels in US drinking water.

Some of the unregulated byproducts may possibly pose greater health risks than the regulated chemicals.

Due to its acidic nature, adding chloramine to the water supply may increase exposure to lead in drinking water, especially in areas with older housing; this exposure can result in increased lead levels in the bloodstream, which may pose a significant health risk. Fortunately, water treatment plants can add caustic chemicals at the plant which have the dual purpose of reducing the corrosivity of the water, and stabilizing the disinfectant.

=== Swimming pool disinfection ===
In swimming pools, chloramines are formed by the reaction of free chlorine with amine groups present in organic substances, mainly those biological in origin (e.g., urea in sweat and urine). Chloramines, compared to free chlorine, are both less effective as a sanitizer and, if not managed correctly, more irritating to the eyes of swimmers. Chloramines are responsible for the distinctive "chlorine" smell of swimming pools, which is often misattributed to elemental chlorine by the public. Some pool test kits designed for use by homeowners do not distinguish free chlorine and chloramines, which can be misleading and lead to non-optimal levels of chloramines in the pool water. There is also evidence that exposure to chloramine can contribute to respiratory problems, including asthma, among swimmers. Respiratory problems related to chloramine exposure are common and prevalent among competitive swimmers.

Though chloramine's distinctive smell has been described by some as pleasant and even nostalgic, its formation in pool water as a result of bodily fluids being exposed to chlorine can be minimised by encouraging showering and other hygiene methods prior to entering the pool, as well as refraining from swimming while suffering from digestive illnesses and taking breaks to use the bathroom, instead of simply urinating in the pool.

== Safety ==
US EPA drinking water quality standards limit chloramine concentration for public water systems to 4 parts per million (ppm) based on a running annual average of all samples in the distribution system. In order to meet EPA-regulated limits on halogenated disinfection by-products, many utilities are switching from chlorination to chloramination. While chloramination produces fewer regulated total halogenated disinfection by-products, it can produce greater concentrations of unregulated iodinated disinfection byproducts and N-nitrosodimethylamine. Both iodinated disinfection by-products and N-nitrosodimethylamine have been shown to be genotoxic, causing damage to the genetic information within a cell resulting in mutations which may lead to cancer.

Another newly-identified byproduct of chloramine is chloronitramide anions, whose toxicity has not yet been determined.

=== Lead poisoning ===
When a community water supply switches from chlorine to monochloramine as a disinfectant, lead is known to leach from lead pipes.

Chlorine's oxidative nature stabilizes a passivation layer of lead dioxide in lead pipes, but chloramine is a weaker oxidant than elemental chlorine. Thus, when chlorine is replaced by monochloramine in water supplies, lead dioxide can be reduced to more water-soluble forms of lead, leading to increased lead concentrations in drinking water.

== Synthesis and chemical reactions ==
Chloramine is readily soluble in water and ether, but less so in chloroform and carbon tetrachloride. It is highly unstable when concentrated. Pure chloramine decomposes violently above −40 °C (−40 °F). When in a gaseous form and an aqueous solution, it is thermally slightly more stable.

=== Production ===
In dilute aqueous solution, chloramine is prepared by the reaction of ammonia with sodium hypochlorite:

NH_{3} + NaOCl → NH_{2}Cl + NaOH

Chloramine also occurs from the reaction of urea in urine:

2 HClO + CO(NH_{2})_{2} → CO_{2} + H_{2}O + 2 NH_{2}Cl

Gaseous chloramine can be obtained from the reaction of gaseous ammonia with chlorine gas (diluted with nitrogen gas):

2 NH_{3} + Cl_{2} ⇌ NH_{_{2}}Cl + NH_{4}Cl

Pure chloramine can be prepared by passing fluoroamine through calcium chloride:

2 NH_{2}F + CaCl_{2} → 2 NH_{2}Cl + CaF_{2}

=== Decomposition ===
The covalent N−Cl bonds of chloramines are readily hydrolyzed with release of hypochlorous acid:

RR′NCl + H_{2}O ⇌ RR′NH + HOCl

The quantitative hydrolysis constant (K value) represents the bactericidal power of chloramines, and generally ranges from 10^{−4} to 10^{−10} (2.8×10^{−10} for monochloramine). It is given by the formula below:

$$K = \frac{ c_{\text{RR}'\text{NH}} \cdot c_\text{HOCl} }{ c_{\text{RR}'\text{NCl}} }$$

In aqueous solution, chloramine slowly decomposes to dinitrogen and ammonium chloride in a neutral or mildly alkaline (pH ≤ 11) medium:

3 NH_{2}Cl → N_{2} + NH_{4}Cl + 2 HCl

However, only a few percent of a 0.1 M chloramine solution in water decomposes according to the formula in several weeks. At pH values above 11, the following reaction with hydroxide ions slowly occurs:

3 NH_{2}Cl + 3 OH^{−} → NH_{3} + N_{2} + 3 Cl^{−} + 3 H_{2}O

In an acidic medium at pH values of around 4, chloramine disproportionates to form dichloramine, which in turn disproportionates again at pH values below 3 to form nitrogen trichloride:

2 NH_{2}Cl + H^{+} ⇌ NHCl_{2} + NH^{+}_{4}
3 NHCl_{2} + H^{+} ⇌ 2 NCl_{3} + NH^{+}_{4}

At low pH values, nitrogen trichloride dominates and at pH 3–5 dichloramine dominates. These equilibria are disturbed by the irreversible decomposition of both compounds:

NHCl_{2} + NCl_{3} + 2 H_{2}O → N_{2} + 3 HCl + 2 HOCl

=== Reactions ===
In water, chloramine is pH-neutral. It is an oxidizing agent (acidic solution: E° = +1.48 V, in basic solution E° = +0.81 V):

NH_{2}Cl + 2 H^{+} + 2 e^{−} → NH^{+}_{4} + Cl^{−}

Reactions of chloramine include radical, nucleophilic, and electrophilic substitution of chlorine, electrophilic substitution of hydrogen, and oxidative additions.

Chloramine can, like hypochlorous acid, donate positively charged chlorine in reactions with nucleophiles (Nu^{−}):

Nu^{−} + NH_{3}Cl^{+} → NuCl + NH_{3}

Examples of chlorination reactions include transformations to dichloramine and nitrogen trichloride in acidic medium, as described in the decomposition section.

Chloramine may also aminate nucleophiles (electrophilic amination):

Nu^{−} + NH_{2}Cl → NuNH_{2} + Cl^{−}

The amination of ammonia with chloramine to form hydrazine is an example of this mechanism seen in the Olin Raschig process:

NH_{2}Cl + NH_{3} + NaOH → N_{2}H_{4} + NaCl + H_{2}O

Chloramine electrophilically aminates itself in neutral and alkaline media to start its decomposition:

2 NH_{2}Cl → N_{2}H_{3}Cl + HCl

The chlorohydrazine (N_{2}H_{3}Cl) formed during self-decomposition is unstable and decomposes itself, which leads to the net decomposition reaction:

3 NH_{2}Cl → N_{2} + NH_{4}Cl + 2 HCl

Monochloramine oxidizes sulfhydryls and disulfides in the same manner as hypochlorous acid, but only possesses 0.4% of the biocidal effect of HClO.

== See also ==
- Disinfection
- Disinfection by-products
- Water treatment
- Pathogen
- Chloramines
