= Percent active chlorine =

Unit of concentration for hypochlorite-based bleaches

Percent active chlorine is a unit of concentration used for hypochlorite-based bleaches. One gram of a 100% active chlorine bleach has the quantitative bleaching capacity as one gram of free chlorine. The term "active chlorine" is used because most commercial bleaches also contain chlorine in the form of chloride ions, which have no bleaching properties.

Liquid bleaches for domestic use fall in 3 categories: for pool-treatment (10% hypochlorite solutions, without surfactants and detergents), for laundry and general purpose cleaning, at 3–5% active chlorine (which are usually recommended to be diluted substantially before use), and in pre-mixed specialty formulations targeted at particular cleaning, bleaching or disinfecting applications. Commercial chlorine bleaches range from under 10% active chlorine to over 40%.

Formula	Molecular Wt.	Activity/mol	Active chlorine
Cl_{2}	70.90	1	100.0%
NaClO·2 1/2H_{2}O	119.40	1	59.3%
Ca(ClO)_{2}	142.90	2	99.2%
LiClO	58.39	1	121.4%

Values can be higher than 100% because hypochlorite ion has a molecular weight of 51.45 g/mol, whereas dichlorine Cl_{2} has a molecular weight of 70.90 g/mol. Dichlorine has a reference bleaching potential of 100% for its molecular weight. Hypochlorite (ClO) also has a molecule-to-molecule bleaching potential the same as dichlorine. However, its lower molecular weight leads to a higher potential bleaching power. In the example of lithium hypochlorite, the molecular weight 58.39, so it only takes 58.39 grams (2.060 ounces) to equal the bleaching power of 70.90 grams (2.501 ounces) of dichlorine. Therefore $70.90 \div 58.39 = 1.214$ or $121.4%$.

Percent active chlorine values have now virtually replaced the older system of chlorometric degrees: 1% active chlorine is equivalent to 3.16 °Cl. Taking the (reasonable) assumption that all active chlorine present in a liquid bleach is in the form of hypochlorite ions, 1% active chlorine is equivalent to 0.141 mol/kg ClO^{−}(0.141 mol/L if we assume density=1). For a solid bleach, 100% active chlorine is equivalent to 14.1 mol/kg ClO^{−}: lithium hypochlorite has a molar mass of 58.39 g/mol, equivalent to 17.1 mol/kg or 121% active chlorine.

Active chlorine values are usually determined by adding an excess of potassium iodide to a sample of bleach solution and titrating the iodine liberated by displacing it with atomic chlorine with a standard sodium thiosulfate solution and iodine indicator.

$\ce{Cl2 + 2I- -> I2 + 2 Cl}$ or $\ce{ClO- + 2I- + 2H+ -> I2 + H2O + Cl-}$

then

$\ce{2S2O3^2- + I2 -> S4O6^2- + 2I-}$

From the above equations it can be seen that 2 moles of thiosulfate is equivalent to 70.9 grams (2.50 ounces) of active chlorine.

Again the percentage of available chlorine can be calculated through the concept of normality. The gram equivalent of bleaching powder is equal to the gram equivalent of the standard titrant used.

The amount of available chlorine can then be calculated using the following formula:

$\text{Percentage available chlorine} \times \frac{\text{Weight of chlorine}}{\text{Weight of bleaching powder}} \times 100 = \text{Amount of available chlorine}$
