= Potassium hypochlorite =

- Potassium hypochlorite

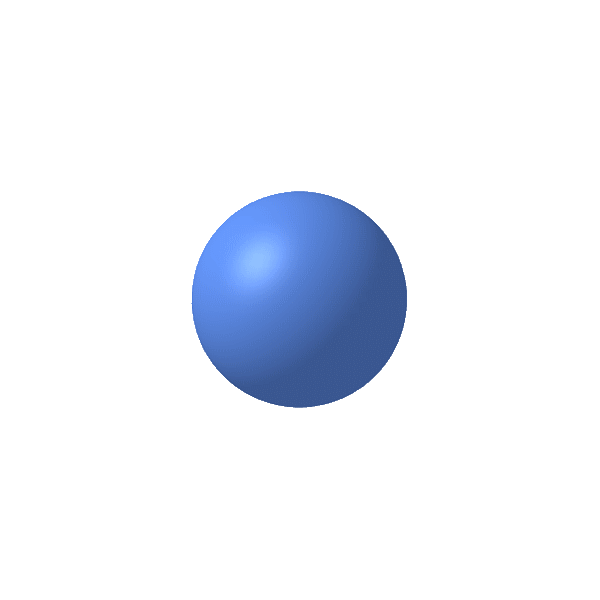

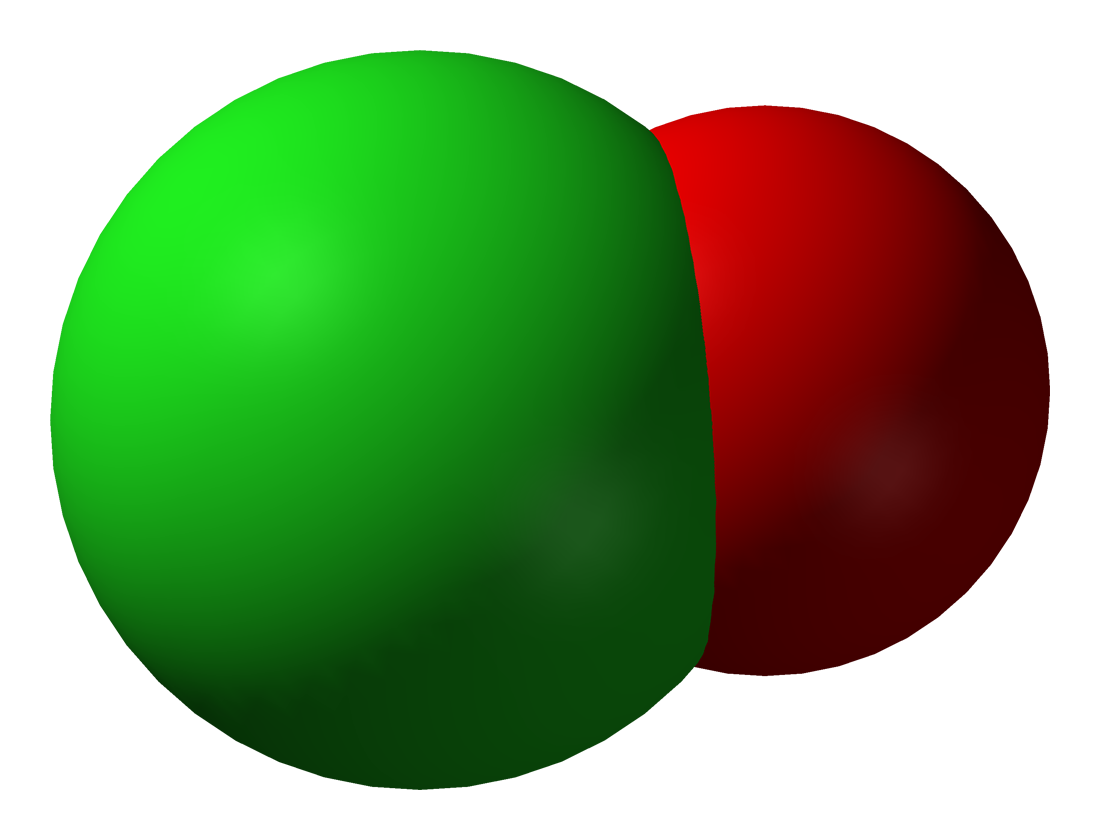

Names
- IUPAC name Potassium hypochlorite
- Other names: Hypochlorous acid, potassium salt (1:1); Potassium chloroxide

Identifiers
CAS Number	7778-66-7
3D model (JSmol)	Interactive image
ChemSpider	56409
ECHA InfoCard	100.029.008
EC Number	231-909-2
PubChem CID	23665762
UNII	G27K3AQ7DW
UN number	1791
CompTox Dashboard (EPA)	DTXSID6042317
- InChI: InChI=1/ClO.K/c1-2;/q-1;+1 Key: SATVIFGJTRRDQU-UHFFFAOYAH
- SMILES: [K+].[O-]Cl

Properties
Chemical formula	KOCl
Molar mass	90.55 g·mol^{−1}
Appearance	Colorless liquid (light yellow when impure) (aqueous solution)
Odor	Pungent irritating chlorine-like (aqueous solution)
Density	1.160 g/cm^{3}
Melting point	−2 °C (28 °F; 271 K)
Boiling point	102 °C (216 °F; 375 K) (decomposes)
Solubility in water	25%

Pharmacology
ATC code	D08 (WHO)

Hazards
- GHS labelling
Pictograms	(GHS07: Exclamation mark) (GHS09: Environmental hazard)
Signal word	Warning
Hazard statements	H336, H411
Precautionary statements	P261, P271, P273, P304+P340, P312, P391, P403+P233, P405, P501
Safety data sheet (SDS)	MSDS

Related compounds
Other anions	Potassium chloride; Potassium chlorite; Potassium chlorate; Potassium perchlorate
Other cations	Lithium hypochlorite; Sodium hypochlorite; Calcium hypochlorite; Barium hypochlorite; Silver hypochlorite
Related compounds	Hypochlorite; Chlorine monoxide; Hypochlorous acid; Methyl hypochlorite
- Except where otherwise noted, data are given for materials in their standard state (at 25 °C [77 °F], 100 kPa). Infobox references

Potassium hypochlorite is a chemical compound with the chemical formula KOCl, also written as KClO. It is the potassium salt of hypochlorous acid. It consists of potassium cations (K^{+}) and hypochlorite anions (^{−}OCl). It is used in variable concentrations, often diluted in water solution. Its aqueous solutions are colorless liquids (light yellow when impure) that have a strong chlorine smell. It is used as a biocide and disinfectant.

== Preparation ==
Potassium hypochlorite is produced by the disproportionation reaction of chlorine with a solution of potassium hydroxide:

Cl_{2} + 2 KOH → KCl + KOCl + H_{2}O

This is the traditional method, first used by Claude Louis Berthollet in 1789.

Another production method is electrolysis of potassium chloride solution. With both methods, the reaction mixture must be kept cold to prevent formation of potassium chlorate.

== Uses ==
Potassium hypochlorite is used for sanitizing surfaces as well as disinfecting drinking water. Because its degradation leaves behind potassium chloride rather than sodium chloride, its use has been promoted in agriculture, where addition of potassium to soil is desired.

== History ==
Potassium hypochlorite was first produced in 1789 by Claude Louis Berthollet in his laboratory located in Javel in Paris, France, by passing chlorine gas through a solution of potash lye. The resulting liquid, known as "Eau de Javel" ("Javel water"), was a weak solution of potassium hypochlorite. Due to production difficulties, the product was then modified using sodium instead of potassium, giving rise to sodium hypochlorite, widely used today as a disinfectant.

== Safety and toxicology ==
Like sodium hypochlorite, potassium hypochlorite is an irritant. It can cause severe damage on contact with the skin, eyes, and mucous membranes. Inhalation of a mist of KOCl can cause bronchus and lung irritation, difficulty breathing, and in severe cases pulmonary edema. Ingestion of strong concentrations can be lethal. Symptoms of contact or inhalation can be delayed.

Potassium hypochlorite is not considered to cause a fire or explosive hazards by itself. However, it can react explosively with numerous chemicals, including urea, ammonium salts, methanol, acetylene, and many organic compounds. Heating and acidification can produce toxic chlorine gas. Containers may explode upon exposure to heat. Potassium hypochlorite forms highly explosive NCl_{3} upon contact with urea or ammonia.
