= Barium hypochlorite =

Identifiers
CAS Number	13477-10-6
3D model (JSmol)	Interactive image
ChemSpider	55536
PubChem CID	61628
CompTox Dashboard (EPA)	DTXSID70928747
- InChI: InChI=1S/Ba.2ClO/c;2*1-2/q+2;2*-1 Key: HPEWZLCIOKVLBZ-UHFFFAOYSA-N
- SMILES: [O-]Cl.[O-]Cl.[Ba+2]

Properties
Chemical formula	Ba(OCl)_{2}
Molar mass	240.232 g/mol
Appearance	white to colorless crystals
Melting point	235 °C (455 °F; 508 K) (decomposes)
Solubility in water	reacts

Related compounds
Other anions	Barium chloride; Barium chlorite; Barium chlorate; Barium perchlorate
Other cations	Lithium hypochlorite; Sodium hypochlorite; Potassium hypochlorite; Calcium hypochlorite; Silver hypochlorite
Related compounds	Hypochlorite; Chlorine monoxide; Hypochlorous acid; Methyl hypochlorite
- Except where otherwise noted, data are given for materials in their standard state (at 25 °C [77 °F], 100 kPa). Infobox references

Barium hypochlorite is a chemical compound with the chemical formula Ba(OCl)_{2} (also written as Ba(ClO)_{2}). It is the barium salt of hypochlorous acid. It consists of barium cations Ba^{2+} and hypochlorite anions ^{−}OCl.

== Applications ==
It is used as a bleaching agent of textiles, paper and pulp; in the decontamination of explosives; as an antiseptic; as an ingredient to make chloropicrin.
