= Electrolysed water =

Chemical mixture in water solution

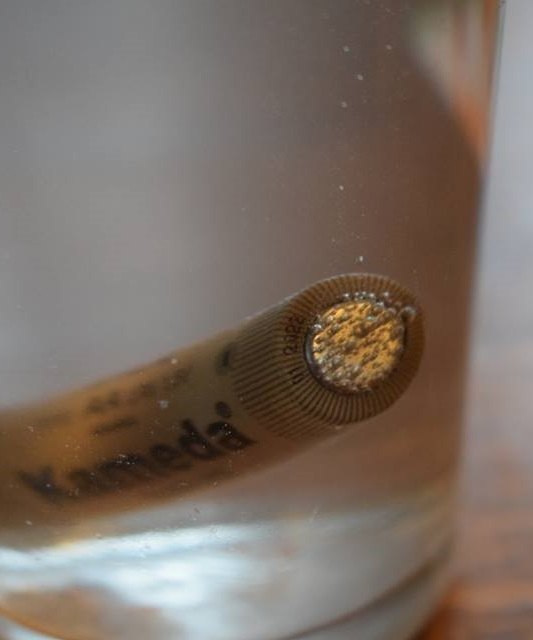
An AA battery in a glass of tap water with salt showing hydrogen produced at the negative terminal

Electrolysed water (also electrolyzed water, EOW, electrolyzed oxidizing water, electro-activated water, super-oxidized solution or electro-chemically activated water solution) is produced by the electrolysis of water containing dissolved sodium chloride. The electrolysis of salt solutions produces a solution of hypochlorous acid and sodium hydroxide. The hypochlorous acid and sodium hydroxide (essentially, bleach) generated by electrolysis can be used as a disinfectant, if the solution is used immediately before the solution degrades.

== Creation ==
The electrolysis occurs in a vessel with separation of the cathodic and anodic solutions.

At the cathode, hydrogen gas and hydroxide ions are produced, leading to an alkaline solution that consists essentially of sodium hydroxide.

At the anode, chloride ions can be oxidized to elemental chlorine, which is present in acidic solution and can be corrosive to metals. If the solution near the anode is acidic then it will contain elemental chlorine.

The key to delivering a powerful sanitizing agent is to form hypochlorous acid without elemental chlorine. This occurs at around neutral pH. Hypochlorous is a weak acid and an oxidizing agent. This "acidic electrolyzed water" can be raised in pH by mixing in the desired amount of hydroxide ion solution from the cathode compartment, yielding a solution of Hypochlorous acid (HOCl) and sodium hydroxide (NaOH). A solution at pH 7.3 will contain equal concentrations of hypochlorous acid and hypochlorite ion; reducing the pH will shift the balance toward the hypochlorous acid. At a pH between 5.5 and 6.0 approximately 90% of the ions are in the form of hypochlorous acid.

== Proposed use as a disinfectant ==
Both sodium hydroxide and hypochlorous acid can be disinfecting agents; The key to effective sanitation is to have a high proportion of hypochlorous acid present, this happens between acidic and neutral pH conditions.

Under some controlled circumstances, EOW can kill bacteria and inactivate viruses. Freshly made EOW (used within 2 minutes of creation) was shown to achieve a 5-log reduction in pathogens.

The disinfectant claims of EOW are based on a formulation containing a mixed oxidant with a corrosive pH of 2.53.

== EPA registration ==
Although the field of electro-chemical activation (ECA) technology has existed for more than 40 years, companies producing such solutions have only recently approached the U.S. Environmental Protection Agency (EPA) seeking registration. Recently, a number of companies that manufacture electrolytic devices have sought and received EPA registration as a disinfectant.

== Drawbacks and risks ==
Electrolyzed alkaline water loses its potency quickly and cannot be stored for long. Electrolysis machines can be, but are not necessarily, expensive to purchase and operate. The electrolysis process needs to be monitored and measured to obtain the correct potency.

Hypochlorous acid, hypochlorite ions, and free chlorine can all react with benign contaminants in tap water to create undesired and harmful byproducts. See disinfection by-products for more information.

== See also ==
- Chloralkali process
- Water ionizer
- Electrolysis of water
- Electrochemical engineering
- Mixed oxidant
