= Calcium oxychloride =

Calcium oxychloride may refer to:

- Calcium hypochlorite (Ca(OCl)_{2})
- Calcium hydroxychloride (CaOHCl_{2})
