= Mixed oxidant =

A mixed oxidant solution (MOS) is a type of disinfectant that has many uses including disinfecting, sterilizing, and eliminating pathogenic microorganisms in water. An MOS may have advantages such as a higher disinfecting power, stable residual chlorine in water, elimination of biofilm, and safety. The main components of an MOS are chlorine and its derivatives (ClO^{−} and HClO), which are produced by electrolysis of sodium chloride. It may also contain high amounts of hydroxy radicals, chlorine dioxide, dissolved ozone, hydrogen peroxide and oxygen from which the name "mixed oxidant" is derived.

== Performance ==
=== Reactions ===
A mixed oxidant solution (MOS) is produced by on-site electrolysis. The concentration of disinfectant output is proportional to the concentration of salt input, voltage, temperature, current, and electrolysis time. An MOS production system contains corrosion-resistant electrodes or dimensionally-stable anodes (DSA) and is made so that different voltages for electrolysis are applied simultaneously to different parts. In this way, different reactions occur at the anode and cathode poles, and therefore, various oxidizing substances are produced.

In this process, the chloride ions at the anode are converted to chlorine gas. After reducing the concentration of chloride ions in the presence of ClO^{−} and Cl_{2} compounds in the solution and applying the required conditions, ClO_{2} is produced and the final solution is stored.

Half-reaction	E° (V)
2Cl^{−} ⇌ Cl_{2} + 2e^{−}	−1.36
0.5Cl_{2} + H_{2}O ⇌ HClO + H^{+} + e^{−}	−1.61
Cl^{−} + H_{2}O ⇌ HClO + H^{+} + e^{−}	-1.48
Cl^{−} + 2OH^{−} ⇌ ClO^{−} + H_{2}O + 2e^{−}	-0.81
HClO + H_{2}O → ClO_{2}+ 3H^{+}+ 3e^{−}	-1.19

For generating ozone, the conditions for water electrolysis reactions must be provided. In this case, the following half reactions take place (which are given below). Hydrogen gas is produced at the cathode and oxygen gas at the anode. By increasing the voltage, the anode half reaction is changed and ozone is produced.

Half-reaction	E° (V)
2H_{2}O + 2e^{−} ⇌ H_{2} + 2OH^{−}	−0.8277
2H_{2}O ⇌ O_{2} + 4H^{+} + 4e^{−}	−1.229
3H_{2}O ⇌ O_{3}+6H^{+}+6e^{−}	−1.53

The rate of ozone generation is influenced by the conditions of the electrolysis reactor. Sustained reactions are capable of generating a solution saturated in ozone, though the solubility of ozone depends on the concentration of other ions.

In the next stage, with little change in reaction conditions, hydrogen peroxide is produced. Hydrogen peroxide and ozone are produced by different half reactions, but each of them may occur in practice.

Half-reaction	E° (V)
O_{2} + H_{2}O ⇌ O_{3} + 2H^{+} + 2e^{−}	−2.076
O_{2} + 2OH^{−} ⇌ O_{3} + H_{2}O + 2e^{−}	−1.24
3H_{2}O ⇌ O_{3} + 6H^{+} + 6e^{−}	−1.53
O_{2} + 2H^{+} + 2e^{−} ⇌ H_{2}O_{2}	−0.7
2H_{2}O ⇌ H_{2}O_{2} + 2H^{+} + 2e^{−}	−1.776
HO_{2} + H^{+} + e^{−} ⇌ H_{2}O_{2}	−1.495

Various conditions, including changes in voltage, current, concentration, pH, temperature, flow, and pressure will change the standard reduction potential, and as a result, the rate of various reactions. However, the extent of the electrodes in the reactor, creating multiple layers of electrolyte and unequal conditions on the electrodes surfaces, will cause major changes in the standard modes of the half reactions.

=== Production Cell ===
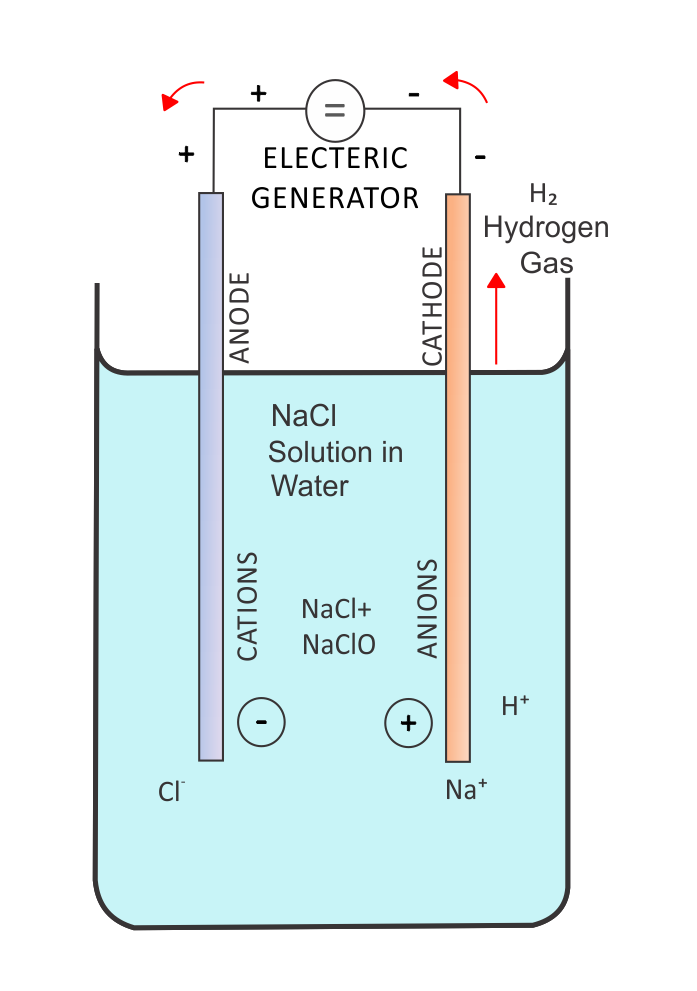
Operation principle of NaCl electrolysis cell

The basis of the mixed oxidant production cell is electrolysis of a water solution of sodium chloride. For producing a mixed oxidants solution, different types of electrolysis cells such as a membrane cell or a standard contact cell (both unipolar and bipolar) are used.

==== Membrane cell ====
This cell consists of anode and cathode electrodes with an ion exchange membrane between them. This membrane allows cations pass through it and leads them to the cathode. This cell has two inputs and two outputs for water. One pair of input and output is located at the cathode side and the other pair is located at the anode side.

Certain cells feature various types of membranes. Some use ion exchange membranes capable of transporting cations and anions across sides. In these cells, a brine solution is introduced from one side, while water is fed from the opposite side.

The half reaction in the cathode chamber is as follows:

2NaCl + 2H_{2}O + 2e^{−}→ 2NaOH + 2Cl^{−}+ H_{2}

On the anode side, part of the chloride ions are oxidized and dissolved in the passing water in the forms of Cl_{2}, HOCl and small amounts of ClO_{2} due to the electrolysis of water. Small amounts of ozone and oxygen gas are produced at the anode side. The main half reaction at the anode side is:

2Cl^{−}→ 2e^{−}+ Cl_{2}

Cl^{−}+ H_{2}O → HClO + H^{+}+ 2e^{−}

When water flows through the anode chamber, it dissolves chlorine and its compounds. By adding the necessary quantity of this mixture to water, it can be purified. The solution exiting the anode chamber in membrane reactors is acidic, with a pH of about 2-3. Fixed titanium electrodes, which are resistant to corrosion at the anode, are suitable for this kind of electrolysis cell.

==== Membraneless cell ====
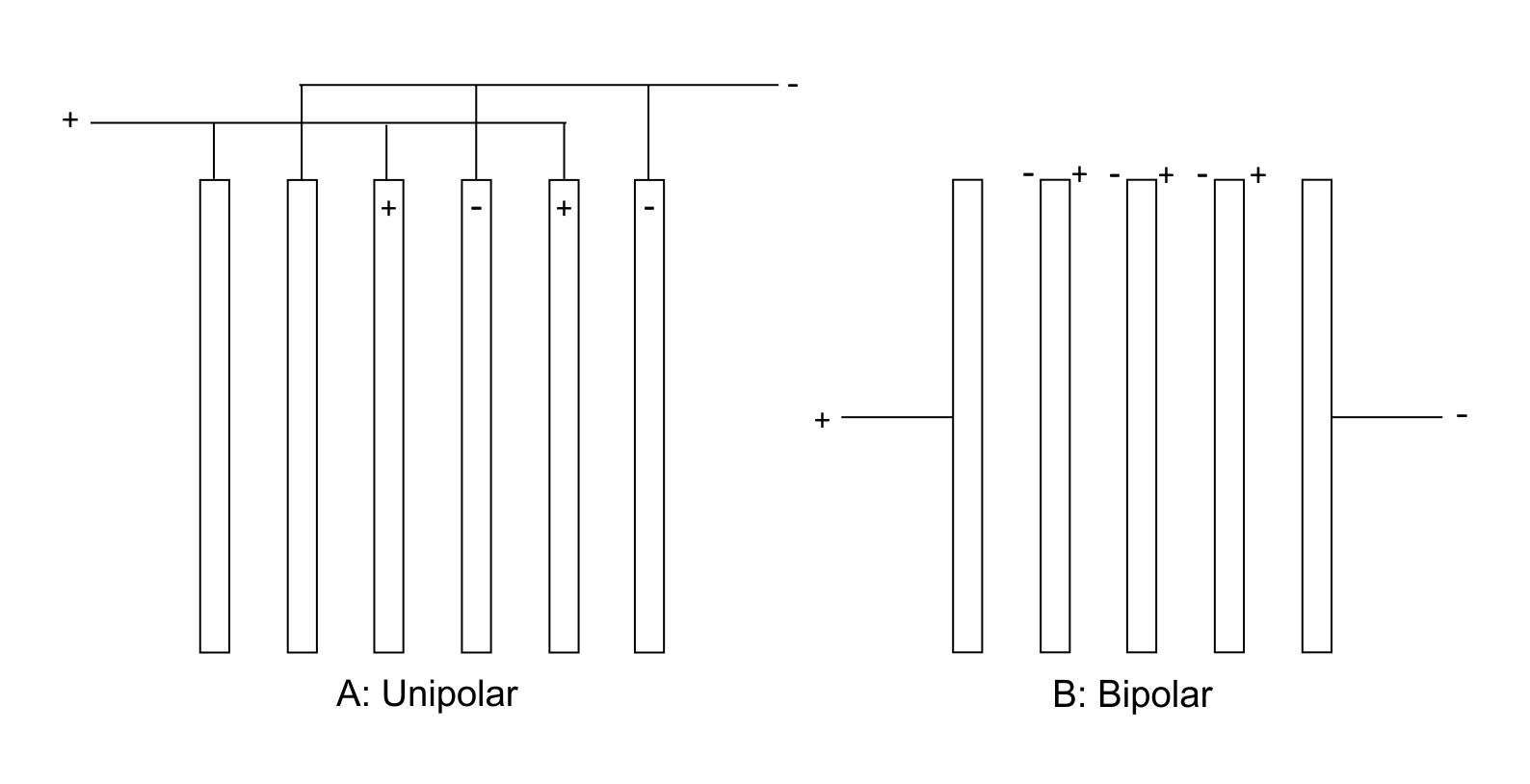
Electrode arrangements in salt electrolysis reactors

The structure of the cell without a membrane is similar to a membrane cell, with the exception that it has one brine solution input and one output for the products. In this case, the anode and cathode products are mixed and go to the cell output. Since the pH of the produced solution is around 8-9, using this solution for disinfection may be unsuitable for base-sensitive applications. Acidic solution is added to reduce pH in these situations. This type of cell can be unipolar or bipolar, as described below.

===== Types of cell connections =====
Electrolysis cells with more than one anode and cathode pair have two types of arrangement: unipolar and bipolar.

Unipolar arrangement: Cells are arranged in parallel and therefore have the same potential difference between the anode-cathode pair. The total current flow is equal to the sum of each pair's current and the voltage is equal to one pair's voltage. In this case, the whole system voltage is low and its current is high.

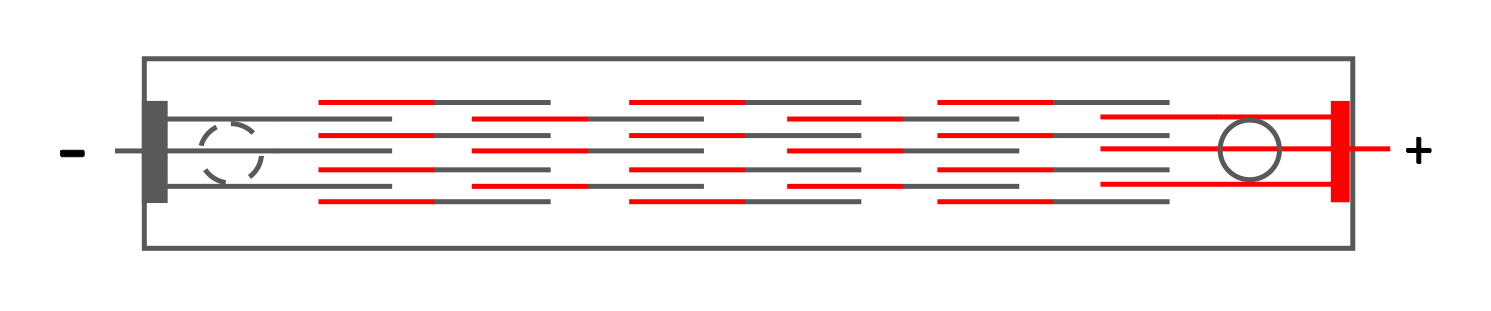
An example of a bipolar arrangement. Half of each electrode plate on both sides is an anode; the other half is the cathode

Bipolar arrangement: Cells are connected in series. Bipolar ordering has multiple configurations. In one case, central electrodes on one side act as the anode and on the other side act as the cathode. In other cases, half of the electrode plate on both sides is the anode and the other half is the cathode.

== Comparisons ==
=== Advantages of Mixed oxidant solution compared to other disinfecting methods ===
Application of mixed-oxidant solution for disinfecting water has several advantages compared to other methods, such as sodium hypochlorite bleach and calcium hypochlorite. The disinfecting effect of applying mixed oxidant is more efficacious and has fewer safety concerns than other methods, such as chlorination and ozonation. It is generally regarded as safer and with fewer risks. A summary of the comparison between the disinfection methods is provided in the table below.

Comparing methods of water disinfection
	Mixed oxidant	Bleach produced locally	UV	Ozone	Chlorine dioxide	Chloramine	Calcium hypochlorite	Bleach	Chlorine gas
Effective Disinfection	yes	yes	yes	yes	yes	yes	yes	yes	yes
safety	yes	yes	yes	no	no	no	no	no	no
Residual chlorine	yes	yes	no	no	no	yes	yes	yes	yes
Less trihalomethanes production	yes	no	yes	yes	yes	yes	no	no	no
Less chlorite and bromate production	yes	yes	yes	yes	no	yes	yes	yes	yes
Biofilm removal	yes	no	no	no	yes	no	no	no	no
Algae removal	yes	no	no	yes	yes	no	no	no	no
Virus removal	yes	no	no	yes	no	no	no	no	no
Remove parasite eggs	yes	no	no	no	no	no	no	no	no
Usage in the pretreatment	yes	no	no	yes	yes	yes	no	no	no
Removing taste and odor	yes	no	no	yes	no	no	no	no	yes
Easy maintenance	yes	yes	no	no	no	yes	no	no	yes

In the next table, the effectiveness of mixed oxidant and bleach in terms of deactivating bacteria and viruses has been compared. In many cases a mixed oxidant is more effective against pathogens either by inactivating more pathogens, requiring less contact time, or less product than bleach. An MOS is also effective against more bacteria and viruses than bleach.

Comparison of Mixed oxidant and Bleach in terms of deactivating bacteria and viruses
Microorganisms	Injection rate (mg/L)		Contact time (min)		Inactivation (log)		Differentiating Parameter
Microorganisms	Mixed oxidant	Bleach	Mixed oxidant	Bleach	Mixed oxidant	Bleach	Differentiating Parameter
Bacteria
Vibrio cholerae	2	2	1.8	4.0	4		time
Escherichia coli	2	2	3.8	5.0	4		time
Pseudomonas aeruginosa	2	2	10	10	>4.8	2.2	Efficacy
Legionella pneumophila	2	2	10	10	5	4.7	Efficacy
Staphylococcus aureus	2	2	60	60	1.6	0.8	Efficacy
Staphylococcus aureus	4	4	60	60	3.7	2.3	Efficacy
Listeria monocytogenes	2	2	60	60	2	0.8	Efficacy
Listeria monocytogenes	4	4	60	60	3.7	1.2	Efficacy
Bacteria spores
Bacillus stearothermophilus	2	2	30	30	>5	2.5	Efficacy
Clostridium perfringens spore	2	2	13	18	2		time
Bacillus globigii spores Bacillus anthracis (Sterne) spores	2.5	2.5	15	15	3.6	2.4	Efficacy
Viruses
MS2 Coliphage	2	2	70	168	4		time
Vaccine (Smallpox surrogate)	5	~70	20	10	4	3	Time, concentration, efficacy
Poliovirus vaccine strain 1	>4	NA	30	NA	>5.5		NA
Rotavirus SA-11	>4	NA	30	NA	>5.5		NA
Protozoa oocysts
Giardia lamblia	>4	NA	30	NA	4		NA
Cryptosporidium parvum	5	5	240	1440	3	>none	Time and efficacy
Cryptosporidium parvum oocysts	25	25	240	240	>1	0.25	Efficacy, qRT-PCR and Tissue culture of infectivity.

=== Comparison of the membrane cell and membraneless cell ===
A mixed oxidant production cell generally works regardless of a membrane. Each of these structures has advantages and disadvantages that should be considered. The membraneless cell output contains hydroxide ions which increase the pH; therefore it affects the composition of the output products. To keep the pH in the neutral range, hydrochloric acid or sulfuric acid must be added to the disinfected water. In this kind of cell, the main product is sodium hypochlorite. On the other hand, in cells with 1 membrane, the anode output (anolyte) is acidic and the cathode output (catholyte) is basic. The anolyte (acidic solution) contains more than four types of oxidants, which can make disinfecting more effective. The output components of these two different cells are compared in the table below.

Comparing output compounds of the membrane cell and the membraneless cell
Oxidizing substance	Units	Membrane cell	Membraneless cell
Oxidizing substance	Units	pH=2–3	pH=8
ozone	ppm	20	-
Chlorine dioxide	ppm	26	-
Hypochlorous acid	ppm	1800	-
Sodium hypochlorite	ppm	-	1400
Hydrogen Peroxide	ppm	40	0
Oxygen	ppm	11	5
ORP	mV	1140	966

At pH higher than 5, most of the hypochlorous acid turns into hypochlorite ions, which is a weaker oxidant compared to hypochlorous acid. Moreover, in a membrane cell, other powerful oxidants such as ozone, chlorine dioxide and hydrogen peroxide can be produced, which are effective for killing bacteria and omitting biofilms in water distribution systems and containers.

Comparing membraneless cell and membrane cell
Property	Units	Bipolar cell without Membrane	Membrane cell
Salt intake	Grams per grams of Chlorine	5	5
Electricity consumption	Watt per grams of Mixed oxidant	7	7
Acid consumption		Hydrochloric acid	Citric acid
Water consumption	Liter per grams of Mixed oxidant	1	2
Maximum concentration of Mixed oxidants	Grams per liter	1.6	1.8
Chlorine smell		yes	yes
Solution pH		8–9	2.5–3

Membrane cell systems have been developed for the chloralkali process. Since 1987, practically all new chloralkali plants worldwide apply the membrane system. However, due to their long lifetime and high replacement costs, the existing mercury and diaphragm cells are only very slowly being replaced with membrane cells.

== Applications ==
Mixed oxidant solutions for water treatment may improve safety, lower general corrosion rates, increase performance, and save money. MOS may be more effective than bleach and can be used for a variety of applications. Some of these applications are cited below.

Cooling water treatment: An MOS for industrial cooling water treatment and disinfection improves safety and thermal efficiency, lowers general corrosion rates, increases performance, and saves money, resulting in a reduction of downtime, maintenance, and expense. Additionally, it can improve workplace safety by eliminating the handling and storage of hazardous chemicals while maintaining steady microbiological control.

Cooling tower water treatment: An MOS improves cooling tower efficiency, safety, and cost compared to conventional biocide treatment methods for legionella prevention, biofilm removal, and inactivation of other performance-inhibiting waterborne organisms.

Industrial process water and wastewater treatment: As the lowest cost supplier of chlorine for disinfection and oxidation of process water and wastewater prior to discharge, an MOS is used in industrial wastewater treatment. MOS chemistry is more effective at biofilm control. Biochemical and Chemical oxygen demand removal, breakpoint chlorination of ammonia and hydrogen sulfide removal.

Municipal wastewater: As one of the world's most precious natural resources, the reuse of water is becoming increasingly important. MOS is both the most cost-effective solution and the preferred technology for disinfection and oxidation of wastewater for reuse or reintroduction into the environment eliminating many of the negative problems associated with traditional chlorine disinfection.

Drinking water & beverage facilities: An MOS is a proven disinfectant for improving the quality and safety of drinking water with economic savings. It helps provide clean and safe drinking water for rural to urban communities, as well as for food and beverage facilities. It is suited for carbonated soft drinks bottling, brewing, dairy farms and dairy and food processing applications.

Aquatics and pools: An alternative to chlorine for pool cleaning is an MOS. It can reduce skin and eye irritation, and skin redness and dryness often associated with chlorine. An MOS can also reduce maintenance time and costs compared to chlorine as the need for "shocking" and draining the pool is minimized or unnecessary.

Farm applications: There are many disinfecting needs an MOS is utilized for in farm application such as livestock watering, drinking water disinfection, dairy, milking operations, pre- and post-teat dip, CIP sanitizer, poultry cooling & humidification pad treatment, irrigation & drip line cleaning, and iron and manganese removal from the water supply.

Crude oil & gas water management: Enhanced oil recovery almost always involves some kind of water treatment processes. Water treatment technology in the crude oil and gas industry includes disinfection treatment for produced water, frac-water, disposal well sites, enhanced oil recovery, and hydrogen sulfide removal.

== See also ==
- Salt water chlorination
