= Eow =

Eow or EOW may refer to:

- Auiones, Germanic tribes of the 1st century C.E.
- E. O. Wilson (1929–2021), American biologist, theorist, naturalist and author
- Electrolysed water, produced by the electrolysis of ordinary tap water containing dissolved sodium chloride
- Erik Olin Wright (1947–2019), American sociologist
- End of Watch, a 2012 American police film
- The Legend of Zelda: Echoes of Wisdom, a 2024 action-adventure video game
