= Silver hypochlorite =

Names
- IUPAC name Silver(I) hypochlorite
- Other names Argentous hypochlorite Silver hypochlorite

Identifiers
CAS Number	475461-52-0
3D model (JSmol)	Interactive image
PubChem CID	161181821
- InChI: InChI=1S/Ag.ClO/c;1-2/q+1;-1 Key: USOFCTBGGPGUEF-UHFFFAOYSA-N
- SMILES: [O-]Cl.[Ag+]

Properties
Chemical formula	AgOCl
Molar mass	159.32 g·mol^{−1}
Solubility in water	very soluble

Related compounds
Other anions	Silver chloride; Silver chlorite; Silver chlorate; Silver hypobromite; Silver hypoiodite; Silver perchlorate
Other cations	Sodium hypochlorite; Potassium hypochlorite; Calcium hypochlorite; Barium hypochlorite
Related compounds	Hypochlorous acid; Methyl hypochlorite
- Except where otherwise noted, data are given for materials in their standard state (at 25 °C [77 °F], 100 kPa). Infobox references

Silver hypochlorite is a chemical compound with the chemical formula AgOCl (also written as AgClO). It is an ionic compound of silver and the polyatomic ion hypochlorite. The compound is very unstable and rapidly decomposes. It is the silver(I) salt of hypochlorous acid. The salt consists of silver(I) cations (Ag^{+}) and hypochlorite anions (^{−}OCl).

== Properties ==
Silver hypochlorite is very unstable, and its solution will soon disproportionate into silver chlorate and silver chloride:

3 AgOCl → AgClO_{3} + 2 AgCl

If the AgOCl solution is heated to 60 °C, it will rapidly disproportionate. Adding silver oxide stabilizes the solution.

== Synthesis ==
Silver hypochlorite can be prepared by bubbling chlorine through an aqueous suspension of silver oxide:

2 Cl_{2} + Ag_{2}O + H_{2}O → 2 AgCl + 2 HOCl
2 HOCl + Ag_{2}O → H_{2}O + 2 AgOCl

It can also be prepared by the reaction of hypochlorous acid with silver nitrate, producing silver hypochlorite and nitric acid.

HOCl + AgNO_{3} → AgOCl + HNO_{3}
