= Lithium hypochlorite =

Identifiers
CAS Number	13840-33-0
3D model (JSmol)	Interactive image
ChemSpider	55593
ECHA InfoCard	100.034.130
PubChem CID	23665767
RTECS number	NH3486000
UNII	HTN55M2443
CompTox Dashboard (EPA)	DTXSID1034688
- InChI: InChI=1S/ClO.Li/c1-2;/q-1;+1 Key: LWXVCCOAQYNXNX-UHFFFAOYSA-N; InChI=1/ClO.Li/c1-2;/q-1;+1 Key: LWXVCCOAQYNXNX-UHFFFAOYAC
- SMILES: [Li+].[O-]Cl

Properties
Chemical formula	LiOCl
Molar mass	58.39 g·mol^{−1}
Appearance	Colorless or white crystalline solid
Odor	chlorine-like odor
Density	0.531 g/cm^{3} (20 °C)
Melting point	135 °C (275 °F; 408 K)
Boiling point	1,336 °C (2,437 °F; 1,609 K)
Solubility in water	soluble

Related compounds
Other anions	Lithium chloride; Lithium chlorate; Lithium perchlorate
Other cations	Sodium hypochlorite; Potassium hypochlorite; Calcium hypochlorite; Barium hypochlorite; Silver hypochlorite
Related compounds	Hypochlorous acid; Lithium hypofluorite; Methyl hypochlorite

Hazards
Autoignition temperature	> 180 °C (356 °F; 453 K)
- Except where otherwise noted, data are given for materials in their standard state (at 25 °C [77 °F], 100 kPa). verify (what is ?) Infobox references

Lithium hypochlorite is a chemical compound with the chemical formula of LiOCl. It is the lithium salt of hypochlorous acid. It consists of lithium cations (Li^{+}) and hypochlorite anions (^{−}OCl). It is a colorless, crystalline compound. It has been used as a disinfectant for pools, and is also used as a reagent for some chemical reactions.

== Safety ==
Doses of 500 mg/kg cause detrimental clinical signs and significant mortality in rats. The use of chlorine-based disinfectants in domestic water, although widespread, has led to some controversy because of the formation of small quantities of harmful byproducts such as chloroform. Studies showed no uptake of lithium if pools with lithium hypochlorite have been used.

== Use in swimming pools ==
Lithium hypochlorite has been used as a fast-acting disfinectant for vinyl swimming pools. However, due to the increasing demand for lithium in lithium-ion batteries, manufacturers have stopped producing lithium hypochlorite, making it much harder to find these days.

== See also ==
- Sodium hypochlorite
