= Acetyl hypochlorite =

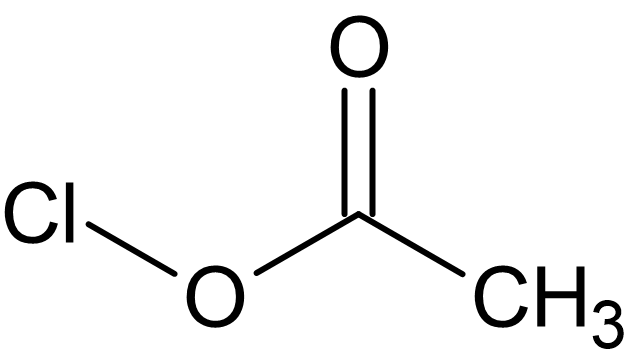

Names
- Systematic IUPAC name Chloro acetate
- Other names: Chlorine acetate; Chlorine(I) acetate; Chloro methylformate

Identifiers
CAS Number	758-11-2
3D model (JSmol)	Interactive image
ChemSpider	14669201
PubChem CID	12616564
- InChI: Key: ZFDLFHQAGYPRBY-UHFFFAOYSA-N; InChI=1S/C2H3ClO2/c1-2(4)5-3/h1H3
- SMILES: CC(=O)OCl

Properties
Chemical formula	C_{2}ClH_{3}O_{2}
Molar mass	94.50 g/mol
Appearance	Colorless liquid
Melting point	100 °C (212 °F; 373 K) (decomposes)
Solubility in water	Reacts
- Except where otherwise noted, data are given for materials in their standard state (at 25 °C [77 °F], 100 kPa). Infobox references

Acetyl hypochlorite, also known as chlorine acetate, is a chemical compound with the formula CH_{3}COOCl. It is a photosensitive colorless liquid that is a short lived intermediate in the Hunsdiecker reaction.

== Preparation, properties, and structure ==
Acetyl hypochlorite is reported to be produced by the reaction of acetic anhydride and dichlorine monoxide at very low temperatures:

Cl_{2}O + (CH3CO)_{2}O → 2CH_{3}COOCl

The liquid can be distilled at reduced pressure, however it cannot be heated, as it violently decomposes at 100 °C to acetic anhydride, oxygen, and chlorine gas, and reacts with water and alcohols. This is a problem in the Hunsdiecker reaction, as it results in a lower yield from the decomposition of this compound if using water or an alcohol as a solvent, so the reaction uses the nonpolar carbon tetrachloride instead. The compound must be stored under 0 °C in the dark, as it slowly decomposes in the presence of light or above 0 °C into methyl chloride and carbon dioxide.

This compound reacts with various metals such as zinc and mercury to produce their respective chlorides and acetates.

In modern uses, the compound is usually prepared in situ, by the reaction of mercury acetate or acetic acid and chlorine or hypochlorous acid, usually in a solvent such as carbon tetrachloride. The compound is in equilibrium with a mixture of acetic acid and hypochlorous acid.

The carbonyl oxygen and the hypochlorite ion were shown to be on the same side. The O-Cl bond was shown to be 1.70 Å, and the molecular geometry around the central carbon was trigonal planar.

== Uses ==
This compound is used for the chlorination of various compounds, especially aromatic compounds, such as the chlorination of methyl acetamide, and has been proven to be a better chlorinating agent than molecular chlorine and hypochlorous acid. However, this reaction is an unwanted side reaction in the Hunsdiecker reaction involving aromatic carboxylates.

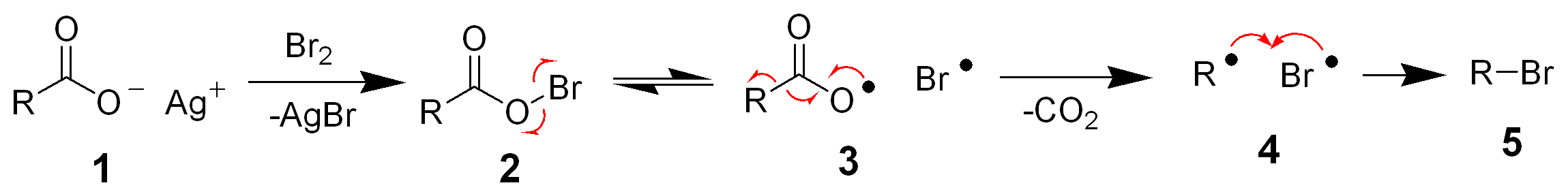

The Hunsdieker reaction is a mechanism to convert salts of carboxylic acids(usually salts of silver) into organic halides which uses aryl hypohalites, such as acetyl hypochlorite (produced in situ by the reaction of silver acetate and chlorine). In the mechanism of this reaction, 2 is the aryl hypohalite intermediate. However, the chlorine analog of the Hunsdiecker reaction is not efficient compared to the bromine and iodine and is not used very much compared to them due to the inconvenience of using a gaseous reagent.

An important use of this compound is the conversion of alkenes into vicinal diols, such as butene into 1,2-butanediol, where acetyl hypochlorite appears at an intermediate; the iodine version of this reaction is known as the Prévost reaction.
