= Calcium hydroxychloride =

Names
- IUPAC name Calcium chloride hydroxide
- Other names: Calcium chloride hydroxide (1/1/1); Calcium hydroxychloride

Identifiers
CAS Number	14031-58-4; 127886-77-5
3D model (JSmol)	Interactive image
PubChem CID	19779969
CompTox Dashboard (EPA)	DTXSID60599844
- InChI: InChI=1S/Ca.ClH.H2O/h;1H;1H2/q+2;;/p-2 Key: CTUDRLGCNRAIEA-UHFFFAOYSA-L
- SMILES: [OH-].[Cl-].[Ca+2]

Properties
Chemical formula	Ca(OH)Cl
Molar mass	92.54 g·mol^{−1}
Appearance	white solid
Density	2.4 g/cm^{3}

Related compounds
Related compounds	Zinc chloride hydroxide monohydrate; Hibbingite; Magnesium hydroxychloride; Aluminium chlorohydrate; Cumengeite; Dicopper chloride trihydroxide
- Except where otherwise noted, data are given for materials in their standard state (at 25 °C [77 °F], 100 kPa). Infobox references

Calcium hydroxychloride or calcium chloride hydroxide is an inorganic compound with the chemical formula Ca(OH)Cl. It consists of calcium cations (Ca^{2+}) and chloride (Cl^{−}) and hydroxide (OH^{−}) anions. A white solid, it forms by the reaction of hydrogen chloride with calcium hydroxide. According to X-ray crystallography, it adopts a layered structure related to brucite (magnesium hydroxide, Mg(OH)_{2}).

Calcium hydroxychloride is sometimes confused with calcium hypochlorite. Calcium hydroxychloride is a double salt, which consists of calcium cations Ca^{2+} and two kinds of anions, chloride Cl^{−} and hydroxide OH^{−}, while calcium hypochlorite consists of calcium cations Ca^{2+} and only one kind of anions, hypochlorite OCl^{−}.

Calcium hydroxychloride may form on concrete roads and bridges as a consequence of the use of calcium chloride as a deicing agent. Calcium chloride reacts with calcium hydroxide (portlandite) present in cement hydration products and forms a deleterious expanding phase also named CAOXY (abbreviation for calcium oxychloride) by concrete technologists. The stress induced into concrete by crystallisation pressure and CAOXY salt expansion can considerably reduce the strength of concrete.
