= Sodium hypochlorite washes =

Skin cleaners

Sodium hypochlorite washes are skin cleansers formulated with sodium hypochlorite (NaOCl) and surfactants. These cleansing liquids or gels are lathered onto wet skin and rinsed off. They are recommended for inflammatory skin conditions (eczema, atopic dermatitis and radiation dermatitis), microbial driven skin disorders (folliculitis, acne, ring worm, skin infections and staph colonization) and body odor.

== Sodium hypochlorite bath ==
Sodium hypochlorite baths became an acceptable treatment of atopic dermatitis due to a 2009 landmark study by JT Huan. The use of sodium hypochlorite in the form of a bleach bath, has been reported to improve atopic dermatitis severity in children with moderate-to-severe dermatitis or eczema.

Solutions of 0.005–0.006% NaOCl are considered safe and still maintain bactericidal activity against Staphylococcus aureus. Bleach bath dilution can be achieved by adding approximately 1/4 cup (60 mL) of household bleach (6% or 8.5%) to a half-full bathtub (20 US gallons or 75 litres) of water. A person would then submerge themselves, from the neck down, or the affected area in the bath for 10 to 30 minutes. Significant reduction in eczema severity was demonstrated in 31 Staphylococcus aureus infected atopic dermatitis patients after 3 months of using dilute bleach baths twice a week, in a randomized, single-blind, placebo-controlled trial. In another clinical trial, Wong evaluated 36 moderate-to-severe atopic dermatitis patients with clinical skin infection and reported improved disease severity with the use of twice-weekly dilute bleach baths.

In addition to having bactericidal activity, sodium hypochlorite baths have been shown to have a direct effect on suppressing NF-κB signaling in the outermost layer of skin in mice, and reduced dermatitis severity in a mouse model of radiation dermatitis. Findings suggest that sodium hypochlorite baths may have a direct suppressive effect on the inflammation. The same investigators demonstrated an anti-aging effect of bleach bath in mice.

Some cases of severe burns have been reported for using too much bleach within the water. Using too little bleach may not be effective and the American Academy of Dermatology recommends using regular strength bleach, not concentrate.

== Sodium hypochlorite cleansers ==
A sodium hypochlorite cleanser is used to cleanse and soothe skin that is prone to infection and conditions such as eczema, atopic dermatitis, folliculitis and other skin conditions. The idea for cleansers came from bleach baths which were used to kill bacteria to prevent infections and treat infections after they occurred. Cleansers were formulated into body washes for gentle, convenient use in the shower as opposed to having bath treatments.

A 2013 study with 18 children (6 months of age and older), showed positive responses using a sodium hypochlorite-formulated body wash called CLn BodyWash to treat atopic dermatitis. The study used an Investigator Global Assessment (IGA) score and measured the body surface area affected by the dermatitis. Patients saw an overall IGA improvement with a mean reduction of 14.8% in affected body surface area. A 2014 study led by Dr Adelaide Herbert showed a decrease in severity scores of 23–35% within 2 weeks and 35–45% reduction in severity scores after 6 weeks using this same wash.
