= Calcium hypochlorite =

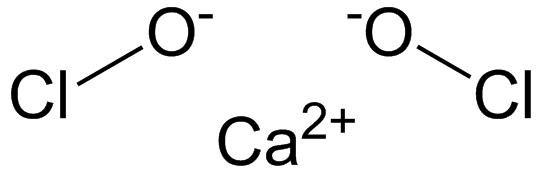
- Calcium oxychloride

Names
- Other names: Hypochlorous acid calcium salt; Bleaching powder; Chloride of lime

Identifiers
CAS Number	7778-54-3
3D model (JSmol)	Interactive image
ChEBI	CHEBI:31342
ChEMBL	ChEMBL2251447
ChemSpider	22912
ECHA InfoCard	100.029.007
EC Number	231-908-7
KEGG	D01727
PubChem CID	24504
RTECS number	NH3485000
UNII	11DXB629VZ
UN number	1748 2208
CompTox Dashboard (EPA)	DTXSID1029700
- InChI: InChI=1S/Ca.2ClO/c;2*1-2/q+2;2*-1 Key: ZKQDCIXGCQPQNV-UHFFFAOYSA-N; InChI=1S/Cacl.ClO/c;1-2/q+2;2*-1 Key: ZKQDCIXGCQPQNV-UHFFFAOYAV
- SMILES: Cl[O-].[Ca+2].Cl[O-]

Properties
Chemical formula	Ca(OCl)_{2}
Molar mass	142.98 g·mol^{−1}
Appearance	white/gray powder
Density	2.35 g/cm^{3} (20 °C)
Melting point	100 °C (212 °F; 373 K)
Boiling point	175 °C (347 °F; 448 K) decomposes
Solubility in water	21 g/(100 mL) at 25 °C
Solubility	reacts in alcohol

Hazards
- GHS labelling
Pictograms	(GHS03: Oxidizing) (GHS05: Corrosive) (GHS07: Exclamation mark) (GHS09: Environmental hazard)
Signal word	Danger
Hazard statements	H272, H302, H314, H400
Precautionary statements	P210, P220, P221, P260, P264, P270, P273, P280, P301+P312, P301+P330+P331, P303+P361+P353, P304+P340, P305+P351+P338, P310, P321, P330, P363, P370+P378, P391, P405, P501
NFPA 704 (fire diamond)	3 0 1 OX
Flash point	Non-flammable
- Lethal dose or concentration (LD, LC)
LD_{50} (median dose)	850 mg/kg (oral, rat)
Safety data sheet (SDS)	ICSC 0638

Related compounds
Other anions	Calcium chloride; Calcium chlorite; Calcium chlorate; Calcium perchlorate
Other cations	Lithium hypochlorite; Sodium hypochlorite; Potassium hypochlorite; Barium hypochlorite; Silver hypochlorite
Related compounds	Hypochlorite; Chlorine monoxide; Hypochlorous acid; Methyl hypochlorite
- Except where otherwise noted, data are given for materials in their standard state (at 25 °C [77 °F], 100 kPa). verify (what is ?) Infobox references

Calcium hypochlorite is an inorganic compound with chemical formula Ca(ClO)_{2}, also written as Ca(OCl)_{2}. It is a white solid, although commercial samples appear yellow. It strongly smells of chlorine, owing to its slow decomposition in moist air. This compound is relatively stable as a solid and solution and has greater available chlorine than sodium hypochlorite. "Pure" samples have 99.2% active chlorine. Given common industrial purity, an active chlorine content of 65-70% is typical. It is the main active ingredient of commercial products called bleaching powder, (Note: also chlorine powder, chloride of lime, chlorinated lime, "dry chlorine") used for water treatment and as a bleaching agent.

== History ==
Charles Tennant and Charles Macintosh developed an industrial process in the late 18th century for the manufacture of chloride of lime, patenting it in 1799. Tennant's process is essentially still used today, and became of military importance during World War I, because calcium hypochlorite was the active ingredient in trench disinfectant.

== Uses ==
=== Sanitation ===
Calcium hypochlorite is commonly used to sanitize swimming pools and disinfect drinking water. Generally the commercial substances are sold with a purity of 65% to 73% with other chemicals present, such as calcium chloride and calcium carbonate, resulting from the manufacturing process. In solution, calcium hypochlorite could be used as a general purpose sanitizer, but due to calcium residue (making the water harder), sodium hypochlorite (bleach) is usually preferred.

=== Organic chemistry ===
Calcium hypochlorite is a general oxidizing agent and therefore finds some use in organic chemistry. For instance the compound is used to cleave glycols, α-hydroxy carboxylic acids and keto acids to yield fragmented aldehydes or carboxylic acids. Calcium hypochlorite can also be used in the haloform reaction to manufacture chloroform. Calcium hypochlorite can be used to oxidize thiol and sulfide byproducts in organic synthesis and thereby reduce their odour and make them safe to dispose of. The reagent used in organic chemistry is similar to the sanitizer at ~70% purity.

== Production ==
Calcium hypochlorite is produced industrially by reaction of moist slaked calcium hydroxide with chlorine gas. The one-step reaction is shown below:

2 Cl_{2} + 2 Ca(OH)_{2} → CaCl_{2} + Ca(OCl)_{2} + 2 H_{2}O

Industrial setups allow for the reaction to be conducted in stages to give various compositions, each producing different ratios of calcium hypochlorite, unconverted lime, and calcium chloride. In one process, the chloride-rich first stage water is discarded, while the solid precipitate is dissolved in a mixture of water and lye for another round of chlorination to reach the target purity. Commercial calcium hypochlorite consists of anhydrous Ca(OCl)_{2}, dibasic calcium hypochlorite Ca_{3}(OCl)_{2}(OH)_{4} (also written as Ca(OCl)_{2}·2Ca(OH)_{2}), and dibasic calcium chloride Ca_{3}Cl_{2}(OH)_{4} (also written as CaCl_{2}·2Ca(OH)_{2}).

== Reactions ==
Calcium hypochlorite reacts rapidly with acids producing calcium chloride, chlorine gas, and water:

Ca(ClO)_{2} + 4 HCl → CaCl_{2} + 2 Cl_{2} + 2 H_{2}O

== Safety ==
It is a strong oxidizing agent, as it contains a hypochlorite ion at the valence +1 (redox state: Cl+1).

Calcium hypochlorite should not be stored wet and hot, or near any acid, organic materials, or metals. The unhydrated form is safer to handle.

== See also ==
- Calcium hydroxychloride
- Sodium hypochlorite
