= Tert-Butyl hypochlorite =

tert-Butyl hypochlorite

Names
- Preferred IUPAC name tert-Butyl hypochlorite

Identifiers
CAS Number	507-40-4
3D model (JSmol)	Interactive image
ChemSpider	454718
ECHA InfoCard	100.007.339
EC Number	208-072-7
PubChem CID	521297
UNII	LS2JTI16JZ
UN number	3255
CompTox Dashboard (EPA)	DTXSID3074941
- InChI: InChI=1S/C4H9ClO/c1-4(2,3)6-5/h1-3H3 Key: IXZDIALLLMRYOU-UHFFFAOYSA-N
- SMILES: ClOC(C)(C)C

Properties
Chemical formula	(CH_{3})_{3}COCl
Molar mass	108.57 g·mol^{−1}
Appearance	Yellow liquid
Density	0.9583 g/cm^{3}
Boiling point	79.6 °C (175.3 °F; 352.8 K) explosive
Solubility in water	Sparingly

Hazards
- GHS labelling
Pictograms	(GHS02: Flammable) (GHS03: Oxidizing) (GHS05: Corrosive) (GHS08: Health hazard)
Signal word	Danger
Hazard statements	H225, H250, H251, H271, H314, H334
Precautionary statements	P210, P220, P221, P222, P233, P235+P410, P240, P241, P242, P243, P260, P264, P280, P283, P285, P301+P330+P331, P302+P334, P303+P361+P353, P304+P340, P304+P341, P305+P351+P338, P306+P360, P310, P321, P342+P311, P363, P370+P378, P371+P380+P375, P403+P235, P405, P407, P413, P420, P422, P501
- Except where otherwise noted, data are given for materials in their standard state (at 25 °C [77 °F], 100 kPa). Infobox references

tert-Butyl hypochlorite is the organic compound with the formula (CH_{3})_{3}COCl. A yellow liquid, it is a rare example of an organic hypochlorite, i.e. a compound with an O-Cl bond. It is a reactive material that is useful for chlorinations. It can be viewed as a lipophilic version of sodium hypochlorite (bleach).

== Synthesis and reactions ==
It is produced by chlorination of tert-butyl alcohol in the presence of base:

(CH_{3})_{3}COH + Cl_{2} + NaOH → (CH_{3})_{3}COCl + NaCl + H_{2}O

tert-Butyl hypochlorite is useful in the preparation of organic chloramines:

R_{2}NH + (CH_{3})_{3}COCl → R_{2}NCl + (CH_{3})_{3}COH
