= Hypochlorous acid =

- hypochlorous acid bonding

- hypochlorous acid space filling Hydrogen, H Oxygen, O Chlorine, Cl

Names
- IUPAC name Hypochlorous acid
- Other names: Chloranol; Chloric(I) acid; Chlorine hydroxide; Chlorooxidane; Hydrogen hypochlorite; Hypochloric acid; Hydroxidochlorine

Identifiers
CAS Number	7790-92-3
3D model (JSmol)	Interactive image
ChEBI	CHEBI:24757
ChemSpider	22757
ECHA InfoCard	100.029.302
EC Number	232-232-5
PubChem CID	24341
UNII	712K4CDC10
CompTox Dashboard (EPA)	DTXSID3036737
- InChI: InChI=1S/ClHO/c1-2/h2H Key: QWPPOHNGKGFGJK-UHFFFAOYSA-N; InChI=1/ClHO/c1-2/h2H Key: QWPPOHNGKGFGJK-UHFFFAOYAT
- SMILES: OCl

Properties
Chemical formula	HOCl
Molar mass	52.46 g·mol^{−1}
Appearance	Colorless aqueous solution
Density	Variable
Solubility in water	Soluble
Acidity (pK_{a})	7.53
Conjugate base	Hypochlorite

Hazards
- Occupational safety and health (OHS/OSH)
Main hazards	corrosive, oxidizing agent
- GHS labelling
Hazard statements	H320, H335
Precautionary statements	P301+P330+P331, P302+P352, P304+P340, P305+P351+P338
NFPA 704 (fire diamond)	3 0 4 OX
Safety data sheet (SDS)	chemfresh.com

Related compounds
Other anions	Hypofluorous acid; Hypobromous acid; Hypoiodous acid
Related compounds	Dichlorine monoxide; Chlorine monoxide; Hypochlorite; Lithium hypochlorite; Sodium hypochlorite; Potassium hypochlorite; Calcium hypochlorite; Barium hypochlorite; Silver hypochlorite; Methyl hypochlorite; tert-Butyl hypochlorite; Acetyl hypochlorite; Chlorine
- Except where otherwise noted, data are given for materials in their standard state (at 25 °C [77 °F], 100 kPa). verify (what is ?) Infobox references

Hypochlorous acid is an inorganic compound with the chemical formula ClOH, also written as HClO, HOCl, or ClHO. Its structure is H−O−Cl. It is an acid that forms when chlorine dissolves in water, and itself partially dissociates, forming a hypochlorite anion, ClO^{−}. HClO and ClO^{−} are oxidizers, and the primary disinfection agents of chlorine solutions. HClO cannot be isolated from these solutions due to rapid equilibration with its precursor, chlorine, and its anhydride, dichlorine monoxide.

Because of its strong antimicrobial properties, the related compounds sodium hypochlorite (NaOCl) and calcium hypochlorite (Ca(OCl)_{2}) are ingredients in many commercial bleaches, deodorants, and disinfectants. The white blood cells of mammals, such as humans, also contain hypochlorous acid as a tool against foreign bodies. In living organisms, HOCl is generated by the reaction of hydrogen peroxide with chloride ions under the catalysis of the heme enzyme myeloperoxidase (MPO).

Like many other disinfectants, hypochlorous acid solutions will destroy pathogens, such as COVID-19, adsorbed on surfaces.

== History ==
Hypochlorous acid was discovered in 1834 by the French chemist Antoine Jérôme Balard (1802–1876) by adding a dilute suspension of mercury(II) oxide in water to a flask of chlorine gas. He also named the acid and its compounds.

Hypochlorous acid is relatively easy to make, but it is difficult to maintain a stable solution. It is not until recent years that scientists have been able to cost-effectively produce and maintain hypochlorous acid water for stable commercial use.

== Uses ==
- In organic synthesis, HClO converts alkenes to chlorohydrins.
- In biology, hypochlorous acid is generated in activated neutrophils by myeloperoxidase-mediated peroxidation of chloride ions, and contributes to the destruction of bacteria and other microbes.
- In medicine, hypochlorous acid water has been used as a disinfectant and sanitiser.
- In wound care, and as of early 2016, the U.S. Food and Drug Administration has approved products whose main active ingredient is hypochlorous acid for use in treating wounds and various infections in humans and pets. It is also FDA-approved as a preservative for saline solutions.
- In disinfection, it has been used in the form of liquid spray, wet wipes and aerosolised application. Recent [when?] studies have shown hypochlorous acid water to be suitable for fog and aerosolised application for disinfection chambers and suitable for disinfecting indoor settings, such as offices, hospitals and healthcare clinics.
- In food service and water distribution, specialized equipment to generate weak solutions of HClO from water and salt is sometimes used to generate adequate quantities of safe (unstable) disinfectant to treat food preparation surfaces and water supplies. It is also commonly used in restaurants due to its non-flammable and nontoxic characteristics.
- In water treatment, hypochlorous acid is the active sanitizer in hypochlorite-based products (e.g. used in swimming pools).
- Similarly, in ships and yachts, marine sanitation devices use electricity to convert seawater into hypochlorous acid to disinfect macerated faecal waste before discharge into the sea.
- In deodorization, hypochlorous acid has been tested to remove up to 99% of foul odours, including garbage, rotten meat, toilet, stool, and urine odours.

== Formation, stability and reactions ==
Addition of chlorine to water gives both hydrochloric acid (HCl) and hypochlorous acid (HClO):

Cl_{2} + H_{2}O ⇌ HClO + HCl
Cl_{2} + 4 OH^{−} ⇌ 2 ClO^{−} + 2 H_{2}O + 2 e^{−}
Cl_{2} + 2 e^{−} ⇌ 2 Cl^{−}

When acids are added to aqueous salts of hypochlorous acid (such as sodium hypochlorite in commercial bleach solution), the resultant reaction is driven to the left, and chlorine gas is formed. Thus, the formation of stable hypochlorite bleaches is facilitated by dissolving chlorine gas into basic water solutions, such as sodium hydroxide.

The acid can also be prepared by dissolving dichlorine monoxide in water; under standard aqueous conditions, anhydrous hypochlorous acid is currently impossible to prepare due to the readily reversible equilibrium between it and its anhydride:

2 HClO ⇌ Cl_{2}O + H_{2}O, K = 3.55 × 10^{−3} dm^{3}/mol (at 0 °C)

The presence of light or transition metal oxides of copper, nickel, or cobalt accelerates the exothermic decomposition into hydrochloric acid and oxygen:

2 Cl_{2} + 2 H_{2}O → 4 HCl + O_{2}

=== Fundamental reactions ===
In aqueous solution, hypochlorous acid partially dissociates into the anion hypochlorite ClO^{−}:

HClO ⇌ ClO^{−} + H^{+}

Salts of hypochlorous acid are called hypochlorites. One of the best-known hypochlorites is NaClO, the active ingredient in bleach.

HClO is a stronger oxidant than chlorine under standard conditions.

2 HClO(aq) + 2 H^{+} + 2 e^{−} ⇌ Cl_{2}(g) + 2 H_{2}O, E = +1.63 V

HClO reacts with HCl to form chlorine:

HClO + HCl → H_{2}O + Cl_{2}

HClO reacts with ammonia to form monochloramine:

NH_{3} + HClO → NH_{2}Cl + H_{2}O

HClO can also react with organic amines, forming N-chloroamines.

Hypochlorous acid exists in equilibrium with its anhydride, dichlorine monoxide.

2 HClO ⇌ Cl_{2}O + H_{2}O, K = 3.55 × 10^{−3} dm^{3}/mol (at 0 °C)

=== Reactivity of HClO with biomolecules ===
Hypochlorous acid reacts with a wide variety of biomolecules, including DNA, RNA, fatty acid groups, cholesterol and proteins.

==== Reaction with protein sulfhydryl groups ====
Knox et al. first noted that HClO is a sulfhydryl inhibitor that, in sufficient quantity, could completely inactivate proteins containing sulfhydryl groups. This is because HClO oxidises sulfhydryl groups, leading to the formation of disulfide bonds that can result in crosslinking of proteins. The HClO mechanism of sulfhydryl oxidation is similar to that of monochloramine, and may only be bacteriostatic, because once the residual chlorine is dissipated, some sulfhydryl function can be restored. One sulfhydryl-containing amino acid can scavenge up to four molecules of HClO. Consistent with this, it has been proposed that sulfhydryl groups of sulfur-containing amino acids can be oxidized a total of three times by three HClO molecules, with the fourth reacting with the α-amino group. The first reaction yields sulfenic acid (R−S−OH) then sulfinic acid (R−S(=O)−OH) and finally R−S(=O)_{2}−OH. Sulfenic acids form disulfides with another protein sulfhydryl group, causing cross-linking and aggregation of proteins. Sulfinic acid and R−S(=O)_{2}−OH derivatives are produced only at high molar excesses of HClO, and disulfides are formed primarily at bacteriocidal levels. Disulfide bonds can also be oxidized by HClO to sulfinic acid. Because the oxidation of sulfhydryls and disulfides evolves hydrochloric acid, this process results in the depletion HClO.

==== Reaction with protein amino groups ====
Hypochlorous acid reacts readily with amino acids that have amino group side-chains, with the chlorine from HClO displacing a hydrogen, resulting in an organic chloramine. Chlorinated amino acids rapidly decompose, but protein chloramines are longer-lived and retain some oxidative capacity. Thomas et al. concluded from their results that most organic chloramines decayed by internal rearrangement and that fewer available NH2 groups promoted attack on the peptide bond, resulting in cleavage of the protein. McKenna and Davies found that 10 mM or greater HClO is necessary to fragment proteins in vivo. Consistent with these results, it was later proposed that the chloramine undergoes a molecular rearrangement, releasing HCl and ammonia to form an aldehyde. The aldehyde group can further react with another amino group to form a Schiff base, causing cross-linking and aggregation of proteins.

==== Reaction with DNA and nucleotides ====
Hypochlorous acid reacts slowly with DNA and RNA as well as all nucleotides in vitro. GMP is the most reactive because HClO reacts with both the heterocyclic NH group and the amino group. In similar manner, TMP with only a heterocyclic NH group that is reactive with HClO is the second-most reactive. AMP and CMP, which have only a slowly reactive amino group, are less reactive with HClO. UMP has been reported to be reactive only at a very slow rate. The heterocyclic NH groups are more reactive than amino groups, and their secondary chloramines are able to donate the chlorine. These reactions likely interfere with DNA base pairing, and, consistent with this, Prütz has reported a decrease in viscosity of DNA exposed to HClO similar to that seen with heat denaturation. The sugar moieties are nonreactive and the DNA backbone is not broken. NADH can react with chlorinated TMP and UMP as well as HClO. This reaction can regenerate UMP and TMP and results in the 5-hydroxy derivative of NADH. The reaction with TMP or UMP is slowly reversible to regenerate HClO. A second slower reaction that results in cleavage of the pyridine ring occurs when excess HClO is present. NAD^{+} is inert to HClO.

==== Reaction with lipids ====
Hypochlorous acid reacts with unsaturated bonds in lipids, but not saturated bonds, and the ClO^{−} ion does not participate in this reaction. This reaction occurs by hydrolysis with addition of chlorine to one of the carbons and a hydroxyl to the other. The resulting compound is a chlorohydrin. The polar chlorine disrupts lipid bilayers and could increase permeability. When chlorohydrin formation occurs in lipid bilayers of red blood cells, increased permeability occurs. Disruption could occur if enough chlorohydrin is formed. The addition of preformed chlorohydrin to red blood cells can affect permeability as well. Cholesterol chlorohydrin have also been observed, but do not greatly affect permeability, and it is believed that Cl_{2} is responsible for this reaction. Hypochlorous acid also reacts with a subclass of glycerophospholipids called plasmalogens, yielding chlorinated fatty aldehydes which are capable of protein modification and may play a role in inflammatory processes such as platelet aggregation and the formation of neutrophil extracellular traps.

== Mode of disinfectant action ==
E. coli exposed to hypochlorous acid lose viability in less than 0.1 seconds due to inactivation of many vital systems. Hypochlorous acid has a reported LD_{50} of 0.0104–0.156 ppm and 2.6 ppm caused 100% growth inhibition in 5 minutes. However, the concentration required for bactericidal activity is also highly dependent on bacterial concentration.

=== Inhibition of glucose oxidation ===
In 1948, Knox et al. proposed the idea that inhibition of glucose oxidation is a major factor in the bacteriocidal nature of chlorine solutions. They proposed that the active agent or agents diffuse across the cytoplasmic membrane to inactivate key sulfhydryl-containing enzymes in the glycolytic pathway. This group was also the first to note that chlorine solutions (HClO) inhibit sulfhydryl enzymes. Later studies have shown that, at bacteriocidal levels, the cytosol components do not react with HClO. In agreement with this, McFeters and Camper found that aldolase, an enzyme that Knox et al. proposes would be inactivated, was unaffected by HClO in vivo. It has been further shown that loss of sulfhydryls does not correlate with inactivation. That leaves the question concerning what causes inhibition of glucose oxidation. The discovery that HClO blocks induction of β-galactosidase by added lactose led to a possible answer to this question. The uptake of radiolabeled substrates by both ATP hydrolysis and proton co-transport may be blocked by exposure to HClO preceding loss of viability. From this observation, it proposed that HClO blocks uptake of nutrients by inactivating transport proteins. The question of loss of glucose oxidation has been further explored in terms of loss of respiration. Venkobachar et al. found that succinic dehydrogenase was inhibited in vitro by HClO, which led to the investigation of the possibility that disruption of electron transport could be the cause of bacterial inactivation. Albrich et al. subsequently found that HClO destroys cytochromes and iron-sulfur clusters and observed that oxygen uptake is abolished by HClO and adenine nucleotides are lost. It was also observed that irreversible oxidation of cytochromes paralleled the loss of respiratory activity. One way of addressing the loss of oxygen uptake was by studying the effects of HClO on succinate-dependent electron transport. Rosen et al. found that levels of reductable cytochromes in HClO-treated cells were normal, and these cells were unable to reduce them. Succinate dehydrogenase was also inhibited by HClO, stopping the flow of electrons to oxygen. Later studies revealed that Ubiquinol oxidase activity ceases first, and the still-active cytochromes reduce the remaining quinone. The cytochromes then pass the electrons to oxygen, which explains why the cytochromes cannot be reoxidized, as observed by Rosen et al. However, this line of inquiry was ended when Albrich et al. found that cellular inactivation precedes loss of respiration by using a flow mixing system that allowed evaluation of viability on much smaller time scales. This group found that cells capable of respiring could not divide after exposure to HClO.

=== Depletion of adenine nucleotides ===
Having eliminated loss of respiration, Albrich et al. proposes that the cause of death may be due to metabolic dysfunction caused by depletion of adenine nucleotides. Barrette et al. studied the loss of adenine nucleotides by studying the energy charge of HClO-exposed cells and found that cells exposed to HClO were unable to step up their energy charge after addition of nutrients. The conclusion was that exposed cells have lost the ability to regulate their adenylate pool, based on the fact that metabolite uptake was only 45% deficient after exposure to HClO and the observation that HClO causes intracellular ATP hydrolysis. It was also confirmed that, at bacteriocidal levels of HClO, cytosolic components are unaffected. So it was proposed that modification of some membrane-bound protein results in extensive ATP hydrolysis, and this, coupled with the cells inability to remove AMP from the cytosol, depresses metabolic function. One protein involved in loss of ability to regenerate ATP has been found to be ATP synthetase. Much of this research on respiration reconfirms the observation that relevant bacteriocidal reactions take place at the cell membrane.

=== Inhibition of DNA replication ===
Recently it has been proposed that bacterial inactivation by HClO is the result of inhibition of DNA replication. When bacteria are exposed to HClO, there is a precipitous decline in DNA synthesis that precedes inhibition of protein synthesis, and closely parallels loss of viability. During bacterial genome replication, the origin of replication (oriC in E. coli) binds to proteins that are associated with the cell membrane, and it was observed that HClO treatment decreases the affinity of extracted membranes for oriC, and this decreased affinity also parallels loss of viability. A study by Rosen et al. compared the rate of HClO inhibition of DNA replication of plasmids with different replication origins and found that certain plasmids exhibited a delay in the inhibition of replication when compared to plasmids containing oriC. Rosen's group proposed that inactivation of membrane proteins involved in DNA replication are the mechanism of action of HClO.

=== Protein unfolding and aggregation ===
HClO is known to cause post-translational modifications to proteins, the notable ones being cysteine and methionine oxidation. A recent examination of HClO's bactericidal role revealed it to be a potent inducer of protein aggregation. Hsp33, a chaperone known to be activated by oxidative heat stress, protects bacteria from the effects of HClO by acting as a holdase, effectively preventing protein aggregation. Strains of Escherichia coli and Vibrio cholerae lacking Hsp33 were rendered especially sensitive to HClO. Hsp33 protected many essential proteins from aggregation and inactivation due to HClO, which is a probable mediator of HClO's bactericidal effects.

== Hypochlorites ==
Hypochlorites are the salts of hypochlorous acid; commercially important hypochlorites are calcium hypochlorite and sodium hypochlorite.

=== Production of hypochlorites using electrolysis ===
Solutions of hypochlorites can be produced in-situ by electrolysis of an aqueous sodium chloride solution in both batch and flow processes. The composition of the resulting solution depends on the pH at the anode. In acid conditions the solution produced will have a high hypochlorous acid concentration, but will also contain dissolved gaseous chlorine, which can be corrosive; at a neutral pH the solution will be around 75% hypochlorous acid and 25% hypochlorite. Some of the chlorine gas produced will dissolve forming hypochlorite ions. Hypochlorites are also produced by the disproportionation of chlorine gas in alkaline solutions.

== Safety ==
HClO is classified as non-hazardous by the Environmental Protection Agency in the US. As an oxidising agent, it can be corrosive or irritant depending on its concentration and pH.

In a clinical test, hypochlorous acid water was tested for eye irritation, skin irritation, and toxicity. The test concluded that it was non-toxic and non-irritating to the eye and skin.

In a 2017 study, a saline hygiene solution preserved with pure hypochlorous acid was shown to reduce the bacterial load significantly without altering the diversity of bacterial species on the eyelids. After 20 minutes of treatment, there was more than 99% reduction of the Staphylococci bacteria.

== Commercialisation ==
Commercial disinfection applications remained elusive for a long time after the discovery of hypochlorous acid because the stability of its solution in water is difficult to maintain. The active compounds quickly deteriorate back into salt water, losing the solution its disinfecting capability, which makes it difficult to transport for wide use. It is less commonly used as a disinfectant compared to bleach and alcohol due to cost, despite its stronger disinfecting capabilities.

Technological developments have reduced manufacturing costs and allow for manufacturing and bottling of hypochlorous acid water for home and commercial use. However, most hypochlorous acid water has a short shelf life. Storing away from heat and direct sunlight can help slow the deterioration. The further development of continuous flow electrochemical cells has been implemented in new products, allowing the commercialisation of domestic and industrial continuous flow devices for the in-situ generation of hypochlorous acid for disinfection purposes.

== See also ==
- Dichlorine monoxide: the corresponding acidic oxide
- Hypofluorous acid
- Perchloric acid
