= Sodium hypochlorite =

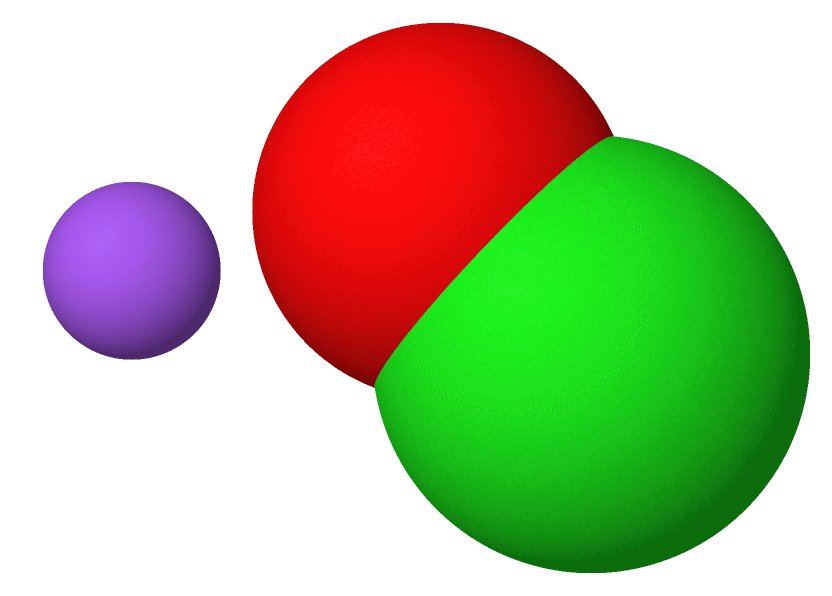
- Sodium, Na Oxygen, O Chlorine, Cl

Names
- IUPAC name Sodium hypochlorite
- Other names: Antiformin; Bleach; Chloride of soda; Sodium chloroxide; In dilution: Carrel-Dakin solution; Modified Dakin's solution; Surgical chlorinated soda solution

Identifiers
CAS Number	7681-52-9 (anhydrous); 10022-70-5 (pentahydrate)
3D model (JSmol)	Interactive image
ChEBI	CHEBI:32146
ChemSpider	22756
DrugBank	DBSALT001517
ECHA InfoCard	100.028.790
EC Number	231-668-3
KEGG	D01711
PubChem CID	23665760
RTECS number	NH3486300
UNII	DY38VHM5OD
UN number	1791
CompTox Dashboard (EPA)	DTXSID8021276
- InChI: InChI=1S/ClO.Na/c1-2;/q-1;+1 Key: SUKJFIGYRHOWBL-UHFFFAOYSA-N; InChI=1/ClO.Na/c1-2;/q-1;+1 Key: SUKJFIGYRHOWBL-UHFFFAOYAD
- SMILES: [Na+].[O-]Cl

Properties
Chemical formula	NaOCl or NaClO
Molar mass	74.44 g·mol^{−1}
Appearance	White crystalline solid (anhydrous); Colorless or slightly yellow or greenish-yellow crystalline solid (pentahydrate)
Odor	Chlorine-like and sweetish (pentahydrate)
Density	1.11 g/cm^{3}
Melting point	18 °C (64 °F; 291 K) (pentahydrate)
Boiling point	101 °C (214 °F; 374 K) (decomposes) (pentahydrate)
Solubility in water	29.3 g/(100 mL) (0 °C)
Acidity (pK_{a})	7.5185
Basicity (pK_{b})	6.4815

Thermochemistry
Std enthalpy of formation (Δ_{f}H^{⦵}_{298})	−347.1 kJ/mol

Pharmacology
ATC code	D08AX07 (WHO)

Hazards
- Occupational safety and health (OHS/OSH)
Main hazards	corrosive, oxidizing agent
- GHS labelling
Pictograms	(GHS05: Corrosive) (GHS09: Environmental hazard)
Signal word	Danger
Hazard statements	H302, H314, H410
Precautionary statements	P260, P264, P273, P280, P301+P330+P331, P303+P361+P353, P304+P340, P305+P351+P338, P310, P321, P363, P391, P405, P501
NFPA 704 (fire diamond)	2 0 1 OX
Safety data sheet (SDS)	ICSC 1119 (solution, > 10% active chlorine); ICSC 0482 (solution, < 10% active chlorine)

Related compounds
Other anions	Sodium chloride; Sodium chlorite; Sodium chlorate; Sodium perchlorate
Other cations	Lithium hypochlorite; Potassium hypochlorite; Calcium hypochlorite; Barium hypochlorite; Silver hypochlorite
Related compounds	Hypochlorite; Chlorine monoxide; Hypochlorous acid; Methyl hypochlorite
- Except where otherwise noted, data are given for materials in their standard state (at 25 °C [77 °F], 100 kPa). verify (what is ?) Infobox references

Sodium hypochlorite is an alkaline inorganic chemical compound with the formula NaOCl (also written as NaClO). It is commonly known in a dilute aqueous solution as bleach or chlorine bleach. It is the sodium salt of hypochlorous acid, consisting of sodium cations (Na^{+}) and hypochlorite anions (^{−}OCl, also written as OCl^{−} and ClO^{−}).

The anhydrous compound is unstable and may decompose explosively. It can be crystallized as a pentahydrate NaOCl·5H_{2}O, a pale greenish-yellow solid which is not explosive and is stable if kept refrigerated.

Sodium hypochlorite is most often encountered as a pale greenish-yellow dilute solution referred to as chlorine bleach, which is a household chemical widely used (since the 18th century) as a disinfectant and bleaching agent. In solution, the compound is unstable and easily decomposes, liberating chlorine, which is the active principle of such products. Sodium hypochlorite is still the most important chlorine-based bleach.

Its corrosive properties, common availability, and reaction products make it a significant safety risk. In particular, mixing liquid bleach with other cleaning products, such as acids found in limescale-removing products, will release toxic chlorine gas. A common misconception is that mixing bleach with ammonia also releases chlorine, but in reality they react to produce still dangerously toxic chloramines such as nitrogen trichloride. With excess ammonia and sodium hydroxide, hydrazine may be generated.

== Chemistry ==
=== Stability of the solid ===
Anhydrous sodium hypochlorite can be prepared but, like many hypochlorites, it is highly unstable and decomposes explosively on heating or friction. The decomposition is accelerated by carbon dioxide at Earth's atmospheric levels - around 4 parts per ten thousand. It is a white solid with the orthorhombic crystal structure.

Sodium hypochlorite can also be obtained as a crystalline pentahydrate NaOCl·5H_{2}O, which is not explosive and is much more stable than the anhydrous compound. The formula is sometimes given in its hydrous crystalline form as 2NaOCl·10H_{2}O. The Cl–O bond length in the pentahydrate is 1.686 Å. The transparent, light greenish-yellow, orthorhombic crystals contain 44% NaOCl by weight and melt at 25–27 °C. The compound decomposes rapidly at room temperature, so it must be kept under refrigeration. At lower temperatures, however, it is quite stable: reportedly only 1% decomposition after 360 days at 7 °C.

A 1966 US patent claims that stable solid sodium hypochlorite dihydrate NaOCl·2H_{2}O can be obtained by carefully excluding chloride ions (Cl^{−}), which are present in the output of common manufacturing processes and are said to catalyze the decomposition of hypochlorite into chlorate (ClO^{−}_{3}) and chloride. In one test, the dihydrate was claimed to show only 6% decomposition after 13.5 months of storage at −25 °C. The patent also claims that the dihydrate can be reduced to the anhydrous form by vacuum drying at about 50 °C, yielding a solid that showed no decomposition after 64 hours at −25 °C.

=== Equilibria and stability of solutions ===
At typical ambient temperatures, sodium hypochlorite is more stable in dilute solutions that contain solvated Na^{+} and OCl^{−} ions. The density of the solution is 1.093 g/mL at 5% concentration, and 1.21 g/mL at 14%, 20 °C. Stoichiometric solutions are fairly alkaline, with pH 11 or higher since the hypochlorite ion is a weak base:

OCl^{−} + H_{2}O ⇌ HOCl + OH^{−}

The following species and equilibria are present in NaOCl/NaCl solutions:

HOCl(aq) ⇌ H^{+} + OCl^{−}
HOCl(aq) + Cl^{−} + H^{+} ⇌ Cl_{2}(aq) + H_{2}O
Cl_{2}(aq) + Cl^{−} ⇌ Cl^{−}_{3}
Cl_{2}(aq) ⇌ Cl_{2}(g)

The second equilibrium equation above will be shifted to the right if the chlorine Cl_{2} is allowed to escape as gas. The ratios of Cl_{2}, HOCl, and OCl^{−} in solution are also pH dependent. At pH below 2, the majority of the chlorine in the solution is in the form of dissolved elemental Cl_{2}. At pH greater than 7.4, the majority is in the form of hypochlorite ClO^{−}. The equilibrium can be shifted by adding acids (such as hydrochloric acid) or bases (such as sodium hydroxide) to the solution:

ClO^{−}(aq) + 2 HCl(aq) → Cl_{2}(g) + H_{2}O + Cl^{−}(aq)
Cl_{2}(g) + 2 OH^{−}(aq) → ClO^{−}(aq) + Cl^{−}(aq) + H_{2}O

At a pH of about 4, such as obtained by the addition of strong acids like hydrochloric acid, the amount of undissociated (nonionized) HOCl is highest. The reaction can be written as:

^{−}OCl + H^{+} ⇌ HOCl

Sodium hypochlorite solutions combined with acid evolve chlorine gas, particularly strongly at pH < 2, by the reactions:

HOCl(aq) + Cl^{−} + H^{+} ⇌ Cl_{2}(aq) + H_{2}O
Cl_{2}(aq) ⇌ Cl_{2}(g)

At pH > 8, the chlorine is practically all in the form of hypochlorite anions (OCl^{−}). The solutions are fairly stable at pH 11–12. Even so, one report claims that a conventional 13.6% NaOCl reagent solution lost 17% of its strength after being stored for 360 days at 7 °C. For this reason, in some applications one may use more stable chlorine-releasing compounds, such as calcium hypochlorite Ca(ClO)_{2} or trichloroisocyanuric acid (CNClO)_{3}.

Anhydrous sodium hypochlorite is soluble in methanol, and solutions are stable.

=== Decomposition to chlorate or oxygen ===
In solution, under certain conditions, the hypochlorite anion may also disproportionate (autoxidize) to chloride and chlorate:

3 ClO^{−} + H^{+} → HClO_{3} + 2 Cl^{−}

In particular, this reaction occurs in sodium hypochlorite solutions at high temperatures, forming sodium chlorate and sodium chloride:

3 NaOCl(aq) → 2 NaCl(aq) + NaClO_{3}(aq)

This reaction is exploited in the industrial production of sodium chlorate.

An alternative decomposition of hypochlorite produces oxygen instead:

2 OCl^{−} → 2 Cl^{−} + O_{2}

In hot sodium hypochlorite solutions, this reaction competes with chlorate formation, yielding sodium chloride and oxygen gas:

2 NaOCl(aq) → 2 NaCl(aq) + O_{2}(g)

These two decomposition reactions of NaOCl solutions are maximized at pH around 6. For example, at 80 °C, with NaOCl and NaCl concentrations of 80 mM, over the pH range 5−10.5, both reactions have rate proportional to $[\ce{HOCl}]^2 [\ce{OCl-}]$, decomposition is fastest at pH 6.5, and chlorate is produced with ~95% efficiency. Above pH 11, both reactions have rate proportional to $[\ce{OCl-}]^2$, decomposition is much slower, and chlorate is produced with ~90% efficiency. This decomposition is affected by light and metal ion catalysts such as copper, nickel, cobalt, and iridium. Catalysts like sodium dichromate Na_{2}Cr_{2}O_{7} and sodium molybdate Na_{2}MoO_{4} may be added industrially to reduce the oxygen pathway, but a report claims that only the latter is effective.

=== Titration ===
Titration of hypochlorite solutions is often done by adding a measured sample to an excess amount of acidified solution of potassium iodide (KI) and then titrating the liberated iodine (I_{2}) with a standard solution of sodium thiosulfate or phenylarsine oxide, using starch as indicator, until the blue color disappears.

According to one US patent, the stability of sodium hypochlorite content of solids or solutions can be determined by monitoring the infrared absorption due to the O–Cl bond. The characteristic wavelength is given as 140.25 μm for water solutions, 140.05 μm for the solid dihydrate NaOCl·2H_{2}O, and 139.08 μm for the anhydrous mixed salt Na_{2}(OCl)(OH).

=== Oxidation of organic compounds ===
Oxidation of starch by sodium hypochlorite, which adds carbonyl and carboxyl groups, is relevant to the production of modified starch products.

In the presence of a phase-transfer catalyst, alcohols are oxidized to the corresponding carbonyl compound (aldehyde or ketone). Sodium hypochlorite can also oxidize organic sulfides to sulfoxides or sulfones; disulfides or thiols to sulfonyl halides; and imines to oxaziridines. It can also de-aromatize phenols.

=== Oxidation of metals and complexes ===
Heterogeneous reactions of sodium hypochlorite and metals such as zinc proceed slowly to give the metal oxide or hydroxide:

NaOCl + Zn → ZnO + NaCl

Homogeneous reactions with metal coordination complexes proceed somewhat faster. This has been exploited in the Jacobsen epoxidation.

=== Other reactions ===
If not properly stored in airtight containers, sodium hypochlorite reacts with carbon dioxide to form sodium carbonate:

2 NaOCl + CO_{2} + H_{2}O → Na_{2}CO_{3} + 2 HOCl

Sodium hypochlorite reacts with most nitrogen compounds to form volatile monochloramines, dichloramines, and nitrogen trichloride:

NH_{3} + NaOCl → NH_{2}Cl + NaOH
NH_{2}Cl + NaOCl → NHCl_{2} + NaOH
NHCl_{2} + NaOCl → NCl_{3} + NaOH

=== Neutralization ===
Sodium thiosulfate is an effective chlorine neutralizer. Rinsing with a 5 mg/L solution, followed by washing with soap and water, will remove chlorine odor from the hands.

== Production ==
=== Chlorination of soda ===
Potassium hypochlorite was first produced in 1789 by Claude Louis Berthollet in his laboratory on the Quai de Javel in Paris, France, by passing chlorine gas through a solution of potash lye. The resulting liquid, known as "Eau de Javel" ("Javel water"), was a weak solution of potassium hypochlorite. Antoine Labarraque replaced potash lye by the cheaper soda lye, thus obtaining sodium hypochlorite (Eau de Labarraque).

Cl_{2}(g) + 2 NaOH(aq) → NaCl(aq) + NaClO(aq) + H_{2}O

Hence, chlorine is simultaneously reduced and oxidized; this process is known as disproportionation.

The process is also used to prepare the pentahydrate NaOCl·5H_{2}O for industrial and laboratory use. In a typical process, chlorine gas is added to a 45–48% NaOH solution. Some of the sodium chloride precipitates and is removed by filtration, and the pentahydrate is then obtained by cooling the filtrate to 12 °C.

=== From calcium hypochlorite ===
Another method involved the reaction of sodium carbonate ("washing soda") with chlorinated lime ("bleaching powder"), a mixture of calcium hypochlorite Ca(OCl)_{2}, calcium chloride CaCl_{2}, and calcium hydroxide Ca(OH)_{2}:

Na_{2}CO_{3}(aq) + Ca(OCl)_{2}(aq) → CaCO_{3}(s) + 2 NaOCl(aq)
Na_{2}CO_{3}(aq) + CaCl_{2}(aq) → CaCO_{3}(s) + 2 NaCl(aq)
Na_{2}CO_{3}(aq) + Ca(OH)_{2}(s) → CaCO_{3}(s) + 2 NaOH(aq)

This method was commonly used to produce hypochlorite solutions for use as a hospital antiseptic that was sold after World War I under the names "Eusol", an abbreviation for Edinburgh University Solution Of (chlorinated) Lime – a reference to the university's pathology department, where it was developed.

=== Electrolysis of brine ===
Near the end of the nineteenth century, E. S. Smith patented the chloralkali process: a method of producing sodium hypochlorite involving the electrolysis of brine to produce sodium hydroxide and chlorine gas, which then mixed to form sodium hypochlorite. The key reactions are:

2 Cl^{−} → Cl_{2} + 2 e^{−} (at the anode)
2 H_{2}O + 2 e^{−} → H_{2} + 2 ^{−}OH (at the cathode)

Both electric power and brine solutions were in cheap supply at the time, and various enterprising marketers took advantage of the situation to satisfy the market's demand for sodium hypochlorite. Bottled solutions of sodium hypochlorite were sold under numerous trade names.

Today, an improved version of this method, known as the Hooker process (named after Hooker Chemicals, acquired by Occidental Petroleum), is the only large-scale industrial method of sodium hypochlorite production. In the process, sodium hypochlorite (NaClO) and sodium chloride (NaCl) are formed when chlorine is passed into a cold dilute sodium hydroxide solution. The chlorine is prepared industrially by electrolysis with minimal separation between the anode and the cathode. The solution must be kept below 40 °C (by cooling coils) to prevent the undesired formation of sodium chlorate.

Commercial solutions always contain significant amounts of sodium chloride (common salt) as the main by-product, as seen in the equation above.

=== From hypochlorous acid and soda ===
A 1966 patent describes the production of solid stable dihydrate NaOCl·2H_{2}O by reacting a chloride-free solution of hypochlorous acid HClO (such as prepared from chlorine monoxide ClO and water), with a concentrated solution of sodium hydroxide. In a typical preparation, 255 mL of a solution with 118 g/L HClO is slowly added with stirring to a solution of 40 g of NaOH in water 0 °C. Some sodium chloride precipitates and is removed by filtration. The solution is vacuum evaporated at 40–50 °C and 1–2 mmHg until the dihydrate crystallizes out. The crystals are vacuum-dried to produce a free-flowing crystalline powder.

The same principle was used in a 1993 patent to produce concentrated slurries of the pentahydrate NaClO·5H_{2}O. Typically, a 35% solution (by weight) of HClO is combined with sodium hydroxide at about or below 25 °C. The resulting slurry contains about 35% NaClO, and are relatively stable due to the low concentration of chloride.

== Packaging and sale ==
Household bleach sold for use in laundering clothes is a 3–8% solution of sodium hypochlorite at the time of manufacture. Strength varies from one formulation to another and gradually decreases with long storage. Sodium hydroxide is usually added in small amounts to household bleach to slow down the decomposition of NaClO.

Domestic use patio blackspot remover products are ~10% solutions of sodium hypochlorite.

A 10–25% solution of sodium hypochlorite is, according to Univar's safety sheet, supplied with synonyms or trade names bleach, Hypo, Everchlor, Chloros, Hispec, Bridos, Bleacol, or Vo-redox 9110.

A 12% solution is widely used in waterworks for the chlorination of water, and a 15% solution is more commonly used for disinfection of wastewater in treatment plants. Sodium hypochlorite can also be used for point-of-use disinfection of drinking water, taking 0.2–2 mg of sodium hypochlorite per liter of water.

Dilute solutions (50 ppm to 1.5%) are found in disinfecting sprays and wipes used on hard surfaces.

== Uses ==
=== Bleaching ===
Household bleach is, in general, a solution containing 3–8% sodium hypochlorite, by weight, and 0.01–0.05% sodium hydroxide; the sodium hydroxide is used to slow the decomposition of sodium hypochlorite into sodium chloride and sodium chlorate.

=== Cleaning ===
Sodium hypochlorite has destaining properties. Among other applications, it can be used to remove mold stains, dental stains caused by fluorosis, and stains on crockery, especially those caused by the tannins in tea. It has also been used in laundry detergents and as a surface cleaner. It is also used in sodium hypochlorite washes.

Its bleaching, cleaning, deodorizing, and caustic effects are due to oxidation and hydrolysis (saponification). Organic dirt exposed to hypochlorite becomes water-soluble and non-volatile, which reduces its odor and facilitates its removal.

=== Disinfection ===
Sodium hypochlorite in solution exhibits broad-spectrum anti-microbial activity and is widely used in healthcare facilities in a variety of settings. It is usually diluted in water depending on its intended use. "Strong chlorine solution" is a 0.5% solution of hypochlorite (containing approximately 5000 ppm free chlorine) used for disinfecting areas contaminated with body fluids, including large blood spills (the area is first cleaned with detergent before being disinfected). It may be made by diluting household bleach as appropriate (normally 1 part bleach to 9 parts water). Such solutions have been demonstrated to inactivate both C. difficile and HPV. "Weak chlorine solution" is a 0.05% solution of hypochlorite used for washing hands, but is normally prepared with calcium hypochlorite granules.

"Dakin's Solution" is a disinfectant solution containing a low concentration of sodium hypochlorite and some boric acid or sodium bicarbonate to stabilize the pH. It is effective with NaOCl concentrations as low as 0.025%.

US government regulations allow food processing equipment and food contact surfaces to be sanitized with solutions containing bleach, provided that the solution is allowed to drain adequately before contact with food and that the solutions do not exceed 200 parts per million (ppm) available chlorine (for example, one tablespoon of typical household bleach containing 5.25% sodium hypochlorite, per gallon of water). If higher concentrations are used, the surface must be rinsed with potable water after sanitizing.

A similar concentration of bleach in warm water is used to sanitize surfaces before brewing beer or wine. Surfaces must be rinsed with sterilized (boiled) water to avoid imparting flavors to the brew; the chlorinated byproducts of sanitizing surfaces are also harmful. The mode of disinfectant action of sodium hypochlorite is similar to that of hypochlorous acid.

Solutions containing more than 500 ppm available chlorine are corrosive to some metals, alloys, and many thermoplastics (such as acetal resin) and need to be thoroughly removed afterward, so the bleach disinfection is sometimes followed by an ethanol disinfection. Liquids containing sodium hypochlorite as the main active component are also used for household cleaning and disinfection, for example toilet cleaners. Some cleaners are formulated to be viscous so as not to drain quickly from vertical surfaces, such as the inside of a toilet bowl.

The undissociated (nonionized) hypochlorous acid is believed to react with and inactivate bacterial and viral enzymes.

Neutrophils of the human immune system produce small amounts of hypochlorite inside phagosomes, which digest bacteria and viruses.

=== Deodorizing ===
Sodium hypochlorite has deodorizing properties, which go hand-in-hand with its cleaning properties.

=== Waste water treatment ===
Sodium hypochlorite solutions have been used to treat dilute cyanide wastewater, such as electroplating wastes. In batch treatment operations, sodium hypochlorite has been used to treat more concentrated cyanide wastes, such as silver cyanide plating solutions. Toxic cyanide is oxidized to cyanate (OCN^{−}) that is not toxic, idealized as follows:

CN^{−} + ^{−}OCl → OCN^{−} + Cl^{−}

Sodium hypochlorite is commonly used as a biocide in industrial applications to control slime and bacteria formation in water systems used at power plants, pulp and paper mills, etc., in solutions typically of 10–15% by weight.

=== Endodontics ===
Sodium hypochlorite is the medicament of choice due to its efficacy against pathogenic organisms and pulp digestion in endodontic therapy. Its concentration for use varies from 0.5% to 5.25%. At low concentrations it dissolves mainly necrotic tissue; at higher concentrations, it also dissolves vital tissue and additional bacterial species. One study has shown that Enterococcus faecalis was still present in the dentin after 40 minutes of exposure of 1.3% and 2.5% sodium hypochlorite, whereas 40 minutes at a concentration of 5.25% was effective in E. faecalis removal. In addition to higher concentrations of sodium hypochlorite, longer time exposure and warming the solution (60 °C) also increases its effectiveness in removing soft tissue and bacteria within the root canal chamber. 2% is a common concentration as there is less risk of an iatrogenic hypochlorite incident. A hypochlorite incident is an immediate reaction of severe pain, followed by edema, haematoma, and ecchymosis as a consequence of the solution escaping the confines of the tooth and entering the periapical space. This may be caused by binding or excessive pressure on the irrigant syringe, or it may occur if the tooth has an unusually large apical foramen.

=== Nerve agent neutralization ===
At the various nerve agent (chemical warfare nerve gas) destruction facilities throughout the United States, 0.5–2.5% sodium hypochlorite is used to remove all traces of nerve agent or blister agent from Personal Protection Equipment after an entry is made by personnel into toxic areas.

0.5–2.5% sodium hypochlorite is also used to neutralize any accidental releases of the nerve agent in the toxic areas.

Lesser concentrations of sodium hypochlorite are used similarly in the Pollution Abatement System to ensure that no nerve agent is released into the furnace flue gas.

=== Reduction of skin damage ===
Dilute bleach baths have been used for decades to treat moderate to severe eczema in humans. Still, it has not been clear why they work. One of the reasons why bleach helps is that eczema can frequently result in secondary infections, especially from bacteria like Staphylococcus aureus, which makes managing it difficult. Staphylococcus aureus infection is related to the pathogenesis of eczema and AD. Bleach baths are one method for lowering the risk of staph infections in people with eczema. The antibacterial and anti-inflammatory properties of sodium hypochlorite contribute to the reduction of harmful bacteria on the skin and the reduction of inflammation, respectively. According to work published by researchers at the Stanford University School of Medicine in November 2013, a very dilute (0.005%) solution of sodium hypochlorite in water was successful in treating skin damage with an inflammatory component caused by radiation therapy, excess sun exposure or aging in laboratory mice. Mice with radiation dermatitis given daily 30-minute baths in bleach solution experienced less severe skin damage and better healing and hair regrowth than animals bathed in water. Nuclear factor kappa-light-chain-enhancer of activated B cells (NF-κB) is known to play a critical role in inflammation, aging, and response to radiation. The researchers found that if NF-κB activity was blocked in elderly mice by bathing them in bleach solution, the animals' skin began to look younger, going from old and fragile to thicker, with increased cell proliferation. The effect diminished after the baths were stopped, indicating that regular exposure was necessary to maintain skin thickness.

== Safety ==
Dilute sodium hypochlorite solutions (as in household bleach) are irritating to mainly the skin and respiratory tract. Short-term skin contact with household bleach may cause dryness of the skin.

It is estimated that there are about 3,300 accidents needing hospital treatment caused by sodium hypochlorite solutions each year in British homes (RoSPA, 2002).

=== Oxidation and corrosion ===
Sodium hypochlorite is a strong oxidizer. Oxidation reactions are corrosive. Solutions burn the skin and cause eye damage, especially when used in concentrated forms. Despite this, sodium hypochlorite solutions are not classified as oxidizers by the NFPA as "sodium hypochlorite solutions do not readily yield oxygen or other oxidizing gases and do not initiate or promote combustion of combustible materials".

Household bleach and pool chlorinator solutions are typically stabilized by a significant concentration of lye (caustic soda, NaOH) as part of the manufacturing reaction. This additive will by itself cause caustic irritation or burns due to defatting and saponification of skin oils and destruction of tissue. The slippery feel of bleach on the skin is due to this process.

=== Storage hazards ===
Contact of sodium hypochlorite solutions with metals may evolve flammable hydrogen gas. Containers may explode when heated due to the release of chlorine gas.

Hypochlorite solutions are corrosive to common container materials such as stainless steel and aluminium. The few compatible metals include titanium (which however is not compatible with dry chlorine) and tantalum. Glass containers are safe. Some plastics and rubbers are affected too; safe choices include polyethylene (PE), high density polyethylene (HDPE, PE-HD), polypropylene (PP), some chlorinated and fluorinated polymers such as polyvinyl chloride (PVC), polytetrafluoroethylene (PTFE), and polyvinylidene fluoride (PVDF); as well as ethylene propylene rubber, and Viton.

Containers must allow the venting of oxygen produced by decomposition over time, otherwise, they may burst.

=== Reactions with other common products ===
Mixing bleach with some household cleaners can be hazardous.

Sodium hypochlorite solutions, such as liquid bleach, will release toxic chlorine gas when mixed with an acid, such as hydrochloric acid or vinegar.

A 2008 study indicated that sodium hypochlorite and organic chemicals (e.g., surfactants, fragrances) contained in several household cleaning products can react to generate chlorinated organic compounds. The study showed that indoor air concentrations significantly increase (8–52 times for chloroform and 1–1170 times for carbon tetrachloride, respectively, above baseline quantities in the household) during the use of bleach containing products.

In particular, mixing hypochlorite bleaches with amines (for example, cleaning products that contain or release ammonia, ammonium salts, urea, or related compounds and biological materials such as urine) produces chloramines. These gaseous products can cause acute lung injury. Chronic exposure, for example, from the air at swimming pools where chlorine is used as the disinfectant, can lead to the development of atopic asthma.

Bleach can react violently with hydrogen peroxide and produce oxygen gas:

H_{2}O_{2}(aq) + NaOCl(aq) → NaCl(aq) + H_{2}O + O_{2}(g)

Explosive reactions or byproducts can also occur in industrial and laboratory settings when sodium hypochlorite is mixed with diverse organic compounds.

=== Limitations in health care ===
The UK's National Institute for Health and Care Excellence in October 2008 recommended that Dakin's solution should not be used in routine wound care.

== Environmental impact ==
In spite of its strong biocidal action, sodium hypochlorite per se has limited environmental impact, since the hypochlorite ion rapidly degrades before it can be absorbed by living beings.

However, one major concern arising from sodium hypochlorite use is that it tends to form persistent chlorinated organic compounds, including known carcinogens, that can be absorbed by organisms and enter the food chain. These compounds may be formed during household storage and use as well as during industrial use. For example, when household bleach and wastewater were mixed, 1–2% of the available chlorine was observed to form organic compounds. As of 1994, not all the byproducts had been identified, but identified compounds include chloroform and carbon tetrachloride. The exposure to these chemicals from use is estimated to be within occupational exposure limits.

== See also ==
- Calcium hypochlorite Ca(OCl)_{2} ("bleaching powder")
- Potassium hypochlorite KOCl (the original "Javel water")
- Lithium hypochlorite LiOCl
- Milton sterilizing fluid
- Sodium hypochlorite washes
- Mixed oxidant

== Bibliography ==
- Jones FL (December 1972). "Chloride poisoning from mixing household cleaners". JAMA. 222 (10): 1312. doi:10.1001/jama.222.10.1312. PMID 4678160.
- Bonnard M, Brondeau MT, Falcy M, Jargot D, Miraval S, Protois J, Schneider O. "Eaux et extraits de Javel Hypochlorite de sodium en solution". Fiche Toxicologique. 157.
