= Methyl hypochlorite =

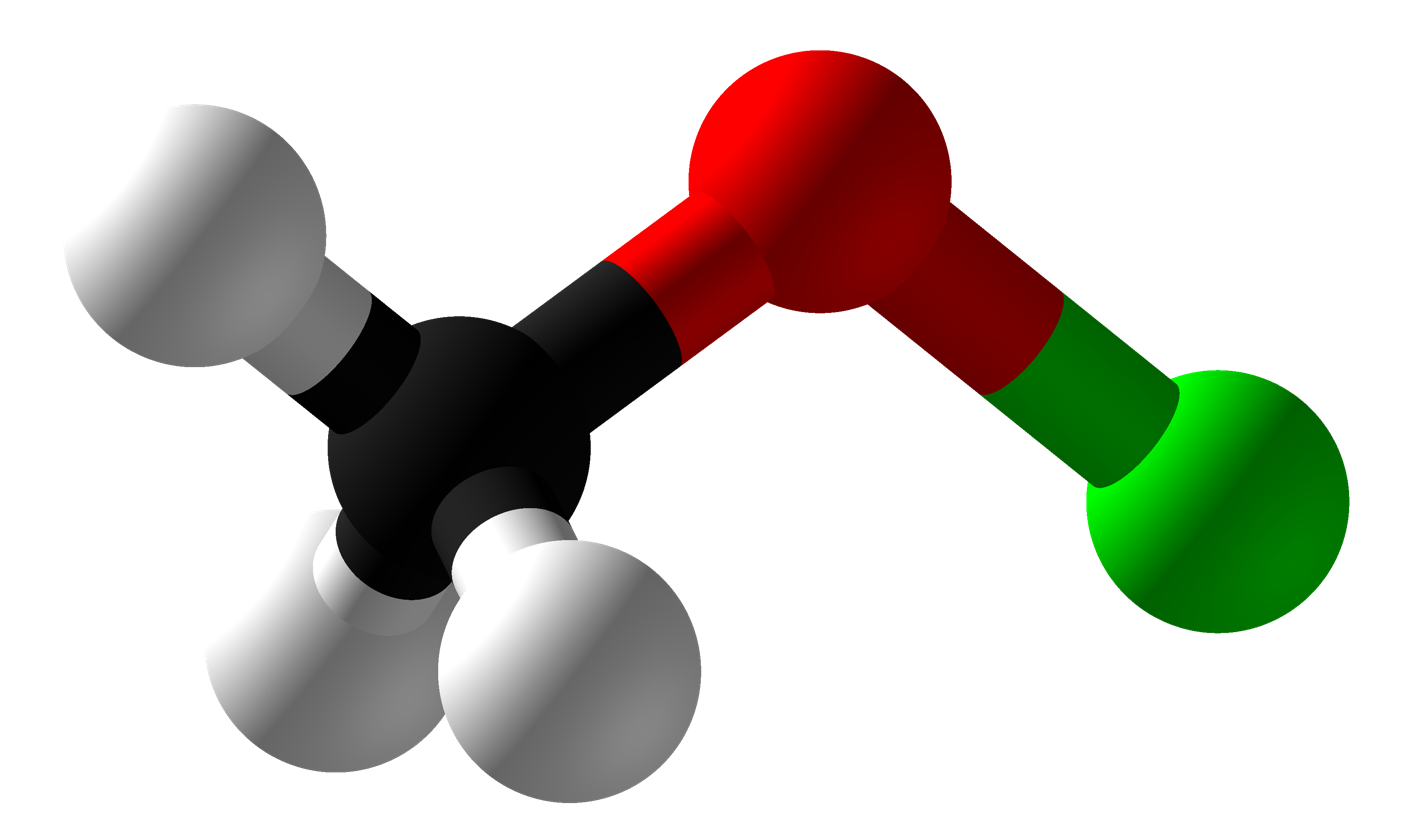

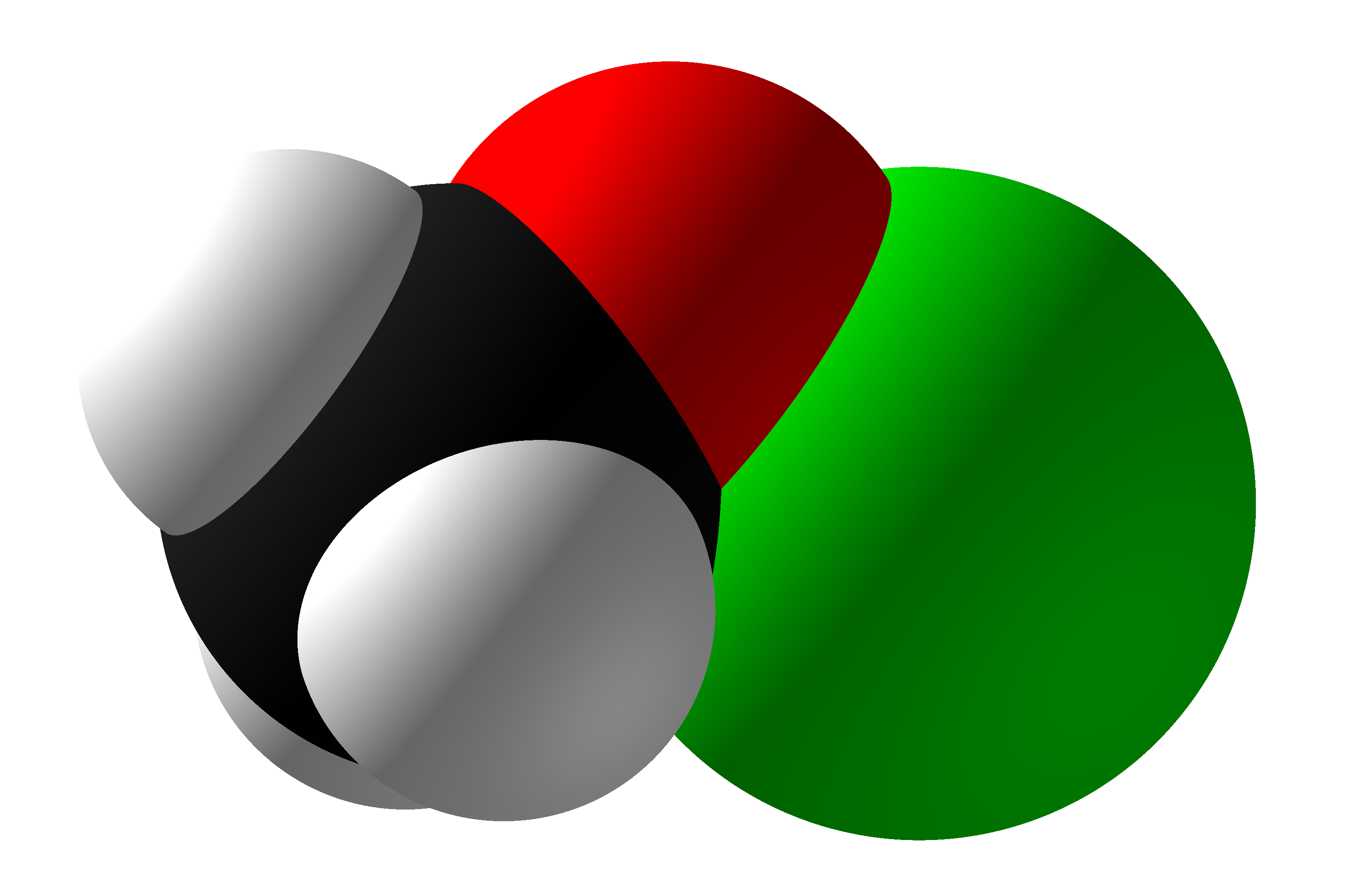

Names
- Preferred IUPAC name Methyl hypochlorite
- Other names (Chlorooxy)methane; Hypochlorous acid methyl ester; Methoxy chloride

Identifiers
CAS Number	593-78-2
3D model (JSmol)	Interactive image
ChemSpider	71388
PubChem CID	79056
CompTox Dashboard (EPA)	DTXSID70208036
- InChI: InChI=1S/CH3ClO/c1-3-2/h1H3 Key: UCFFGYASXIPWPD-UHFFFAOYSA-N; InChI=1S/CH3ClO/c1-3-2/h1H3 Key: UCFFGYASXIPWPD-UHFFFAOYSA-N
- SMILES: COCl

Properties
Chemical formula	CH_{3}ClO
Molar mass	66.48 g·mol^{−1}
Appearance	Gas
Odor	Pungent
Density	1.058 g/cm^{3}
Melting point	−120.4 °C (−184.7 °F; 152.8 K)
Boiling point	9.18 °C (48.52 °F; 282.33 K)
Solubility in water	Decomposes
Refractive index (n_{D})	1.343

Hazards
- GHS labelling
Pictograms	(GHS01: Explosive) (GHS02: Flammable) (GHS05: Corrosive) (GHS08: Health hazard)
Signal word	Danger
NFPA 704 (fire diamond)	4 4
- Except where otherwise noted, data are given for materials in their standard state (at 25 °C [77 °F], 100 kPa). verify (what is ?) Infobox references

Methyl hypochlorite is the simplest of the organic alkyl hypochlorites. It is an unstable compound that can be produced by the reaction of methanol with hypochlorous acid. It was first synthesized by Traugott Sandmeyer in the 1880s.

Methyl hypochlorite forms in the Earth's atmosphere by a reaction between ClO and CH_{3}OO and is thought to be an important species in ozone destruction over the Arctic and Antarctic regions.

== See also ==
- tert-Butyl hypochlorite, a useful and relatively stable organic hypochlorite
