= Chlorine monoxide =

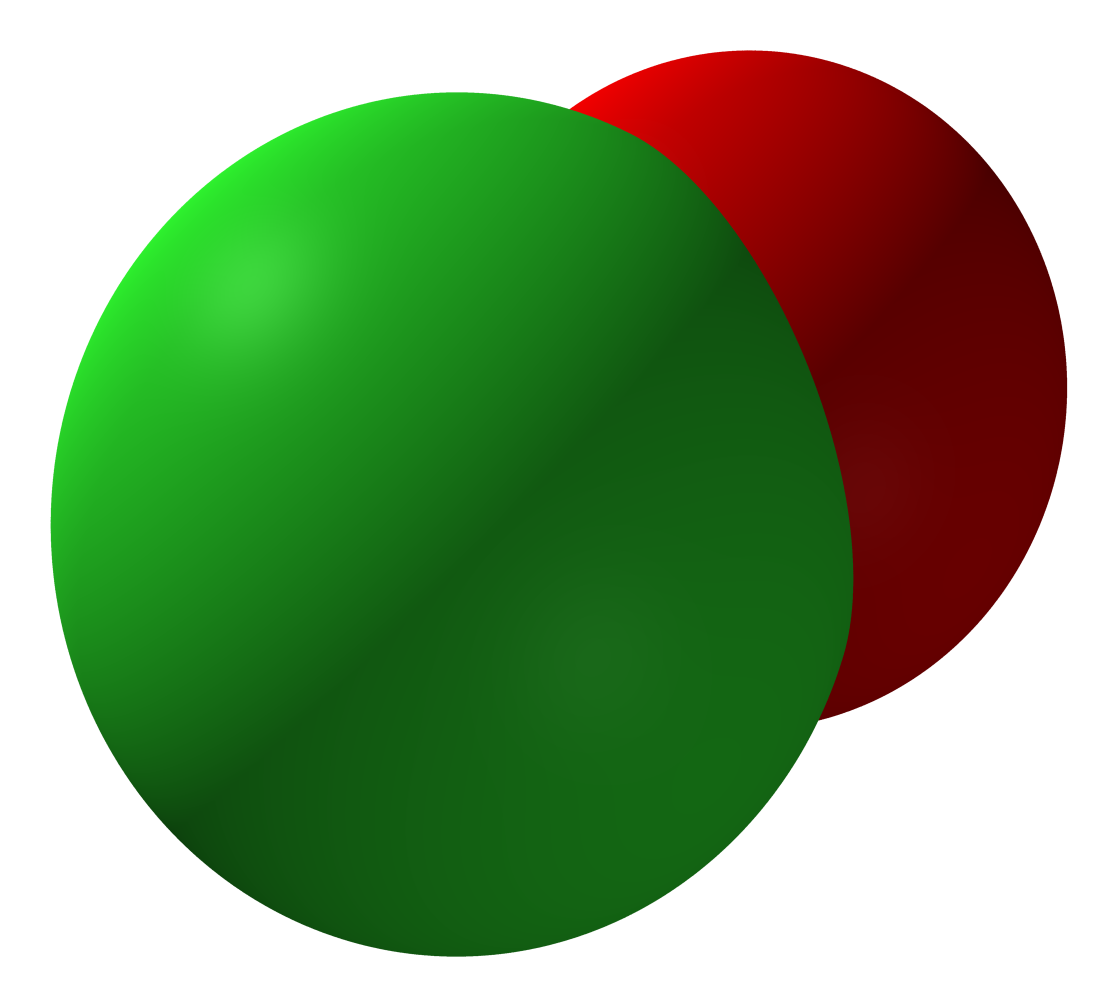

Names
- Preferred IUPAC name Chlorine monoxide
- Systematic IUPAC name Chlorooxidanyl
- Other names Chlorine(II) oxide

Identifiers
CAS Number	7791-21-1
3D model (JSmol)	Interactive image
Abbreviations	ClO^{•}
ChEBI	CHEBI:29314
ChemSpider	145843
MeSH	Chlorosyl
PubChem CID	166686
UNII	0EQ5I4TK19
CompTox Dashboard (EPA)	DTXSID90924342
- InChI: InChI=1S/ClO/c1-2 Key: NHYCGSASNAIGLD-UHFFFAOYSA-N
- SMILES: [O]Cl

Properties
Chemical formula	ClO
Molar mass	51.45 g·mol^{−1}

Thermochemistry
Std enthalpy of formation (Δ_{f}H^{⦵}_{298})	101.8 kJ⋅mol^{−1}
- Except where otherwise noted, data are given for materials in their standard state (at 25 °C [77 °F], 100 kPa). Infobox references

Chlorine monoxide is a chemical radical with the chemical formula ClO^{•}. It plays an important role in the process of ozone depletion. In the stratosphere, chlorine atoms react with ozone molecules to form chlorine monoxide and oxygen.

Cl^{•} + O_{3} → ClO^{•} + O_{2}

This reaction causes the depletion of the ozone layer. The resulting ClO^{•} radicals can further react:

ClO^{•} + O^{•} → Cl^{•} + O_{2}

regenerating the chlorine radical. In this way, the overall reaction for the decomposition of ozone is catalyzed by chlorine, as ultimately chlorine remains unchanged. The overall reaction is:

O^{•} + O_{3} → 2 O_{2}

Chlorofluorocarbons (CFCs) are able to pass into the stratosphere due to their non-reactive nature, where they undergo photo-dissociation to form Cl radicals. These then readily form chlorine monoxide, and this cycle can continue until two radicals react to form dichlorine monoxide, terminating the radical reaction.
