= Paul =

Paul may refer to:

== People ==
- Paul (given name), a given name, including a list of people
  - Paul the Apostle, an apostle who wrote many of the books of the New Testament
  - Ray Hildebrand, half of the singing duo Paul & Paula
  - Paul Stookey, one-third of the folk music trio Peter, Paul and Mary
  - Paul McCartney bassist, keyboardist and vocalist for British Rock band The Beatles
  - Paul Avril, pseudonym of Édouard-Henri Avril (1849–1928), French painter and commercial artist
  - Paul, pen name under which Walter Scott wrote Paul's letters to his Kinsfolk in 1816
- Paul (surname), a list of people
  - Billy Paul, stage name of American soul singer Paul Williams (1934–2016)
  - Vinnie Paul, drummer for American Metal band Pantera
  - Jean Paul, pen name of Johann Paul Friedrich Richter (1763–1825), German Romantic writer

== Places ==
- Paul, Cornwall, a village in the civil parish of Penzance, UK
- Paul (civil parish), Cornwall, UK
- Paul, Alabama, US, an unincorporated community
- Paul, Idaho, US, a city
- Paul, Nebraska, US, an unincorporated community
- Paul, Cape Verde, a concelho (municipality)

== Arts and entertainment ==
- Paul (2011 film), a film featuring Simon Pegg and Nick Frost
- Paul (2025 film), a Canadian documentary film, directed by Denis Côté
- The Paul, a guitar by Gibson
- Paul (album), 2019, by PJ Morton
- "Paul" (song), by the German punk band Die Ärzte
- Paul (play), 2005, by Howard Brenton
- "Paul the Monkey", the mascot of DNA Productions

== Other uses ==
- Aichi E16A, a Japanese World War II reconnaissance floatplane, Allied code name "Paul"
- Paul baronets, three titles, all extinct
- Paul (bakery), a franchise based in France
- Paul (nursery), a plant nursery in Hertfordshire, England
- Paul the Octopus (2008–2010), an octopus that correctly guessed results in the 2010 World Cup
  - Paul II (octopus), the successor of Paul the Octopus
- Hurricane Paul (1982), a Pacific hurricane
- Hurricane Paul (2006), a hurricane that struck Mexico as a tropical depression
- Portable Aqua Unit for Lifesaving (PAUL)

== See also ==
- Saint Paul (disambiguation)
- Paulie (disambiguation)
- Păuleni (disambiguation)
- Păulești (disambiguation)
- Păuleasca (disambiguation)
