= Portable Aqua Unit for Lifesaving =

Portable water filtering device

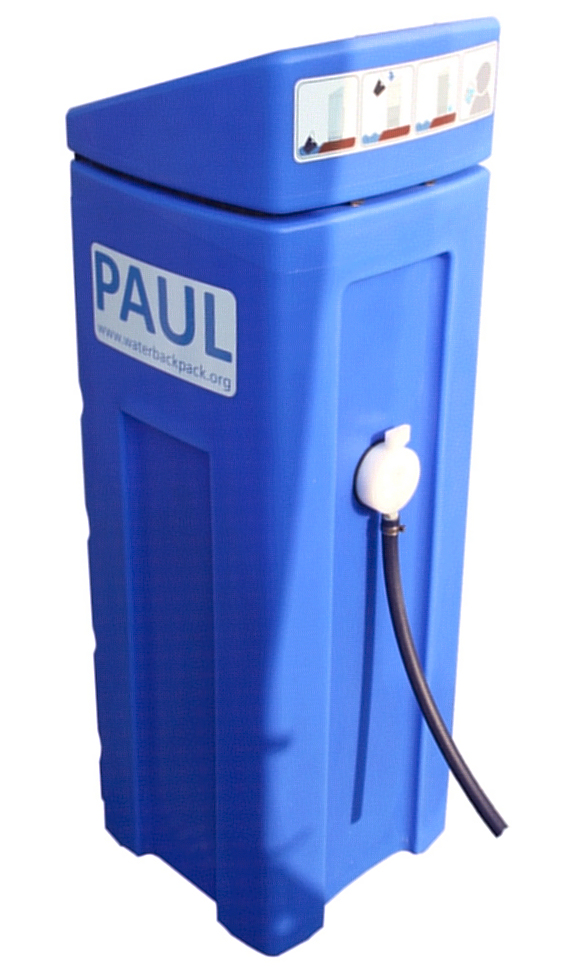
Water backpack "PAUL"

The Portable Aqua Unit for Lifesaving (short PAUL), also known as Water Backpack, is a portable membrane water filter developed at the University of Kassel for humanitarian aid. It allows the decentralized supply of clean water in emergency and disaster situations.

== Technology ==
=== Prerequisites ===
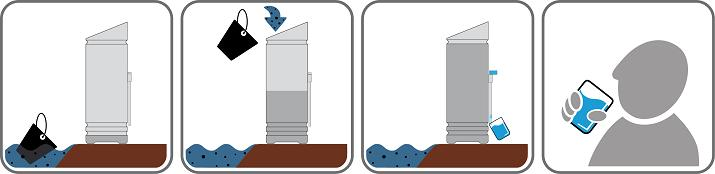
thumbnail images PAUL

The filter only needs water (e.g. from wells or rivers), to function. There are neither chemicals nor energy nor trained personnel required. The entire operation is shown in four pictograms, so that it can be operated without any prior knowledge, as a test with different population groups in India has shown.

=== Operation ===
The core of the device is a membrane filter unit. After it is set up at its destination, it is filled with about 100 litres of raw water from surface waters. After a waiting period of one to two minutes the filtered water flows out of the drain hose. During filtering raw water must be replenished continuously .

=== Performance ===
At about 1.15 metres of water pressure, the water is filtered through the membrane with a pore size of 20 to 100 nm. The device removes bacteria with an efficiency of 99.999% (measurement Institut Fresenius, E. coli and Coliform) and viruses to 99.9% (measured Bonn University, coliphages). A system based on ultrafiltration system (unlike Reverse osmosis based units) is not able to filter out solutes like salts or liquids like mineral oils. They pass through the membrane. Water contaminated with such substances therefore can not be cleaned.

A device with an average supply of 1200 litres of raw water can, according to the Sphere standards (2011), supply clean, drinkable water for 400 people per day.

== Use and dissemination ==
The water filter is designed for use in emergency and disaster situations. As a backpack it can, if necessary, be brought by walking to the locations. It first came in March 2010 to use in Chile. Since September 2010, the spread increased significantly so that in April 2012, about 700 copies in over 30 countries worldwide.

As the lifespan of the membrane is around ten years, aid agencies can leave the device after a disaster on site. Regular servicing or cleaning of the filter every few months is recommended, and depending on the degree of contamination of the raw water necessary. To clean it the backpack is to be filled once completely and then emptied through the bottom outlet to flush the sediments out.

PAUL is beside the German Foreign Office used by many organizations in humanitarian relief.

== Development ==
The device was developed in the Department of Urban Water Management in the Department of Civil Engineering at the University of Kassel under the "German Federal Environmental Foundation" funded projects. The current optimization project will run until mid-2013 in a research project.

== Awards ==
The project "PAUL - Potable water at disasters" in 2011 at the German competition "365 Landmarks in the Land of Ideas" as the national winner in the Category Society Competition.

== See also ==
- LifeSaver bottle
- Tata Swach
- Slingshot (water vapor distillation system)
- LifeStraw

== Literature ==
- HDL – Hundertmal Hilfe für sauberes Wasser auf Haiti – Hundert PAULs erfolgreich im Einsatz (German)
- Global Care – PAUL-Wasserrucksack auf dem Weg nach Haiti: Global-Care startet Hilfsaktion (German)
- Humanity Care Foundation, Robert Hoßfeld: PAUL der Lebensretter, Januar 2011, in: Humanity Care Stiftung/Rotary-Magazin 01/2011 (German)
- Experience report : Nighat Aziz: PAUL – Systeme, 2011, in: Humanity Care Stiftung (German)
