= Millbank bag =

Water filtration device

A Millbank bag is a portable water filtration device made of tightly woven canvas for outdoor use. They are light, compact, and easy but slow to use. The bag is filled with water, which filters through the canvas by gravity. It is useful for removing sediment and organic matter but the water may require further sterilisation before being drunk.

== See also ==
- LifeSaver bottle
