= North Dumpling Light =

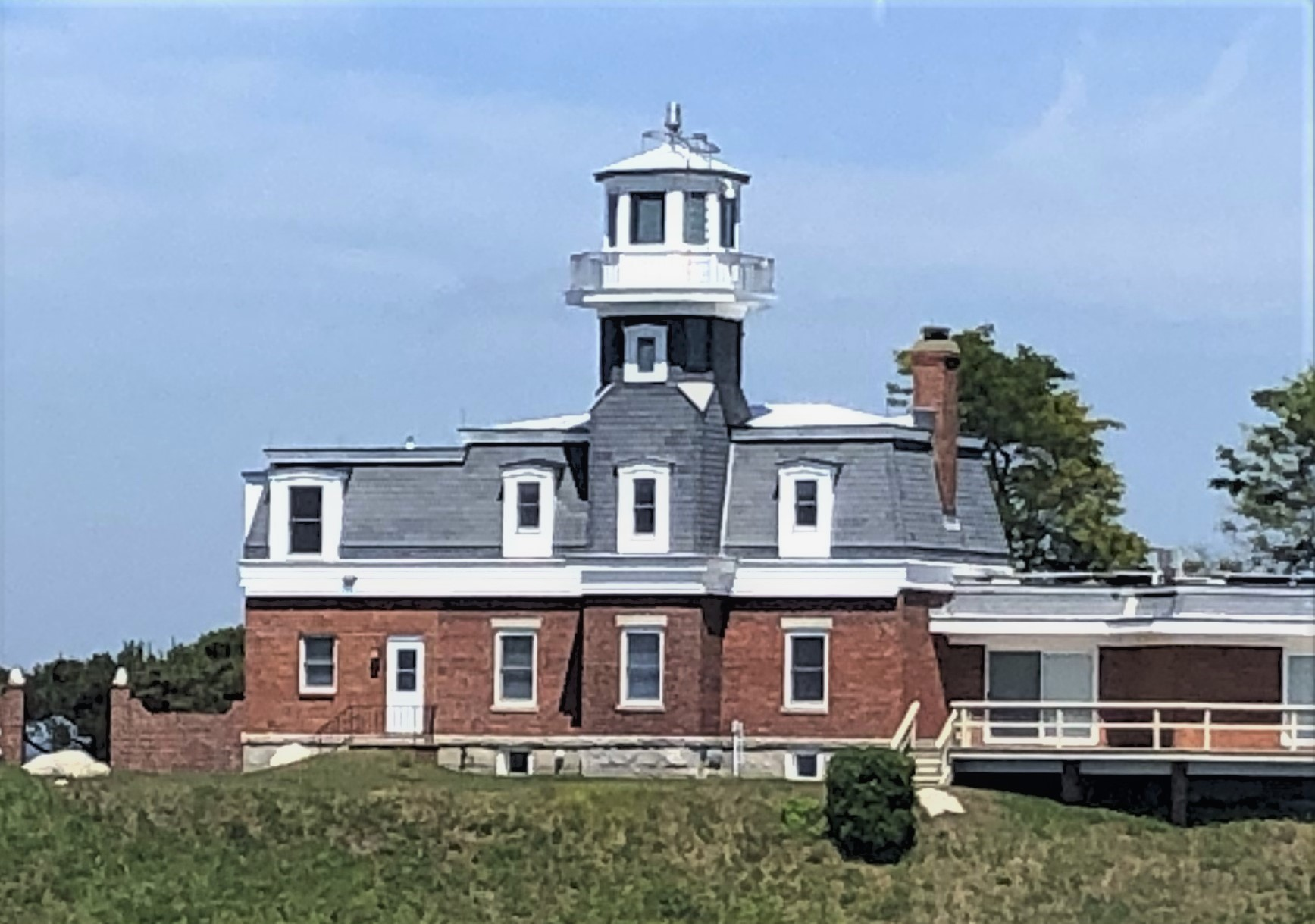
- (2022)
- Location: Fishers Island sound in Long Island Sound, New York
- Coordinates: 41°17′17″N 72°1′10″W

Tower
- Constructed: 1849
- Foundation: Wood Pilings/Stone
- Construction: Brick/Wood Shingle
- Automated: 1959
- Height: 31 feet (9.4 m)
- Shape: Octagonal
- Markings: Natural w/White Lantern
- Fog signal: Horn: 1 blast ev 30s (3s bl)

Light
- First lit: 1849
- Focal height: 60 feet (18 m)
- Lens: Fifth Order Fresnel Lens (original), 12 inches (300 mm) (current)
- Range: 9 nmi (17 km; 10 mi) (white), 7 nmi (13 km; 8.1 mi) (red)
- Characteristic: Fixed White/Fix Red Sector 257 degrees to 023 degrees

North Dumpling Light is a lighthouse on North Dumpling Island in Long Island Sound off Fishers Island, New York, United States. It was constructed in 1849, rebuilt in 1871, and deactivated in 1959, with the aid to navigation being moved to an automated metal tower placed nearby. The lighthouse itself and the grounds around it were sold to a private party. Around 1977, a new owner convinced the U. S. Coast Guard to return the light to the lighthouse and remove the skeleton tower.

== History ==
A survey for a suitable location for a lighthouse in the area was undertaken by Lt. George M Bache, who concluded that two small lights, one on South Dumpling Island and one on North Dumpling would be preferable to a single light on North Dumpling. Congress ignored or disagreed with these findings, and authorized funds for a lighthouse on the north island in 1847. John Winthrop the Younger sold the island to the U.S. government in that year for $600. Construction on the light keeper's house and the 25-foot octagonal tower was completed and the light illuminated in 1849, the lens was upgraded in 1855.

A fogbell was placed on the island by the New York and Stonington Steamboat Line, and the keeper was paid an additional $32 a year by the steamship line to operate it. However, when the keep – Alfred Clark at the time – learned that the keeper of Little Gull Island Light was paid $43, he refused to ring the bell any more. A government fog bell was installed in 1854.

The lighthouse was rebuilt and relit in 1871, increasing the size of the tower to 29 feet and adding a mansard roof to the house. In 1893 a fifth order Fresnel lens and a new Funck lamp were installed, replacing the sixth order Fresnel lens that was installed in 1871.

The lighthouse was deactivated in 1959, being replaced by an automated light on a skeleton tower, and the grounds and lighthouse were sold to a private party, George Washburn. The island was purchased in 1977 by David Levitt, president of the Doughnut Corporation of America, who remodeled and expanded the house. Levitt convinced the Coast Guard to move the light back to the stone tower and remove the skeleton tower. Dean Kamen purchased the island for US$2,500,000 in 1986.
