= Halazone =

Names
- Preferred IUPAC name 4-(Dichlorosulfamoyl)benzoic acid
- Other names: Pantocide; p-Sulfondichloramidobenzoic acid

Identifiers
CAS Number	80-13-7
3D model (JSmol)	Interactive image
ChEMBL	ChEMBL1368146
ChemSpider	3431
ECHA InfoCard	100.001.140
EC Number	201-253-1
PubChem CID	3552
UNII	G359OL82VB
UN number	1479
CompTox Dashboard (EPA)	DTXSID9025370
- InChI: InChI=1S/C7H5Cl2NO4S/c8-10(9)15(13,14)6-3-1-5(2-4-6)7(11)12/h1-4H,(H,11,12) Key: XPDVQPODLRGWPL-UHFFFAOYSA-N
- SMILES: O=C(O)c1ccc(S(=O)(=O)N(Cl)Cl)cc1

Properties
Chemical formula	C_{7}H_{5}Cl_{2}NO_{4}S
Molar mass	270.08 g·mol^{−1}
Appearance	Fine white powder with an odor of chlorine
Melting point	213 °C (415 °F; 486 K); 196 °C with decomposition.
Solubility in water	Less than 1 g/L at 70 °F

Hazards
- GHS labelling
Pictograms	(GHS07: Exclamation mark)
Signal word	Warning
Hazard statements	H315, H319
Precautionary statements	P264, P280, P302+P352, P305+P351+P338, P321, P332+P313, P337+P313, P362
- Except where otherwise noted, data are given for materials in their standard state (at 25 °C [77 °F], 100 kPa). (what is ?) Infobox references

Halazone (4-(dichlorosulfamoyl)benzoic acid) is a chemical compound whose formula can be written as either C_{7}H_{5}Cl_{2}NO_{4}S or (HOOC)(C_{6}H_{4})(SO_{2})(NCl_{2}). It has been widely used to disinfect drinking water.

== Uses ==
Halazone tablets have been used to disinfect water for drinking, especially where treated tap water is not available. A typical dosage is 4 mg/L.

Halazone tablets were commonly used during World War II by U.S. soldiers for portable water purification, even being included in accessory packs for C-rations until 1945.

Halazone was widely used by Marine infantry units during the Vietnam War. Halazone has largely been replaced in that use by sodium dichloroisocyanurate. The primary limitation of halazone tablets was the very short usable life of opened bottles, typically three days or less, unlike iodine-based tablets which have a usable open bottle life of three months.

Dilute halazone solutions (4 to 8 ppm of available chlorine) has also been used to disinfect contact lenses, and as a spermicide.

== Mechanism of action ==
Halazone's disinfecting activity is mainly due to the hypochlorous acid (HClO) released by hydrolysis of the chlorine-nitrogen bonds when the product is dissolved in water:

(R1)(R2)NCl + H_{2}O → HOCl + (R1)(R2)NH

The hypochlorous acid is a powerful oxidizer and chlorinating agent that destroys or denatures many organic compounds.

== Production ==
Halazone can be prepared by chlorination of p-sulfonamidobenzoic acid.

Another synthesis route is the oxidation of dichloramine-T with potassium permanganate in a mild alkaline medium.

== See also ==
- Bleach
- Chlorine-releasing compound
- Chloramine-T (tosylchloramide sodium salt), another water disinfection agent.
- Water chlorination
- Monalazone
