= LifeSaver bottle =

Portable water purification device

LifeSaver® Bottle
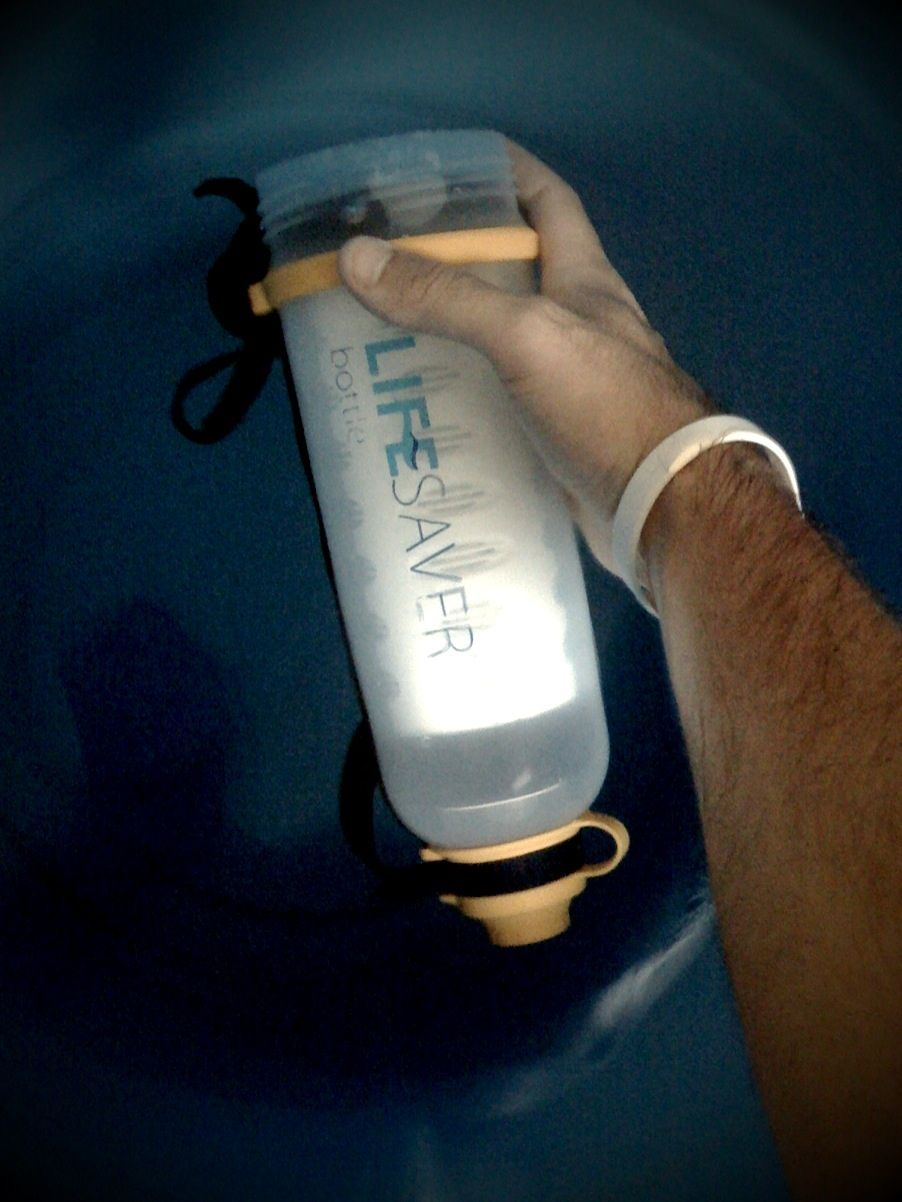
- Inventor: Michael Pritchard
- Manufacturer: Icon LifeSaver Ltd
- Website: http://www.iconlifesaver.com

The LifeSaver bottle is a portable water purification device. The bottle filters out objects larger than 15 nanometres.

== Development ==
After the 2004 Asian tsunami and Hurricane Katrina disaster in the U.S., Michael Pritchard, a water-treatment expert in Ipswich, England began to develop the LifeSaver bottle after seeing that it took multiple days for water to reach refugees. Pritchard presented a prototype of the LifeSaver at 2007's DSEi London, where the product was named "Best Technological Development". Pritchard's entire stock of 1,000 bottles sold out within four hours of the presentation.

Speaking at TED in 2009, Pritchard estimated that by using the LifeSaver bottle, reaching the Millennium Development Goals of halving the number of people without drinking water will cost $8 billion; while $20 billion would provide drinking water for everyone on Earth.

=== Independent test results ===
In 2007, the LifeSaver bottle was tested by the London School of Hygiene & Tropical Medicine and the results found it to completely filter out all bacteria and viruses.

== Use ==
The bottle's interchangeable filter can purify between 4,000 and 6,000 litres (1,050 to 1,585 gallons) before it stops working and needs to be replaced. It filters out objects bigger than 15 Nanometres—including viruses, bacteria, and cysts. The carbon filter does not require chemicals. The process of filtering the water takes 20 seconds, allowing for 0.71 litres (1.5 pints) of water to be filtered. Once a filter has reached its limit, it will not allow contaminated water to be drunk. The LiveSaver bottle has been used by soldiers for drinking water as well as cleaning wounds.

To filter the water, one puts contaminated water in the back of the bottle, then screws the lid on. The lid has a built in pump which is operated manually with a hand; the pumping action forces the contaminated water through the nano-filter and safe drinking water collects in another chamber in the bottle. The drinker then opens the top of the bottle from which safe drinking water comes out.

A much larger version of the LifeSaver bottle, called the LifeSaver Jerrycan, has the same filtering technology. The can allows for the filtration of 10,000 to 20,000 litres (2,650 to 5,300 gallons). One jerrycan filter can provide water for four people over a three-year span.

== Limits ==
The bottle can be used to filter urine and will remove all microbiological contamination. However, there will be an amount of dissolved salts that can not be removed. Metals such as iron, and salt from salt water cannot be removed effectively, either.

== See also ==
- Tata Swach
- Slingshot (water vapor distillation system)
- Millbank bag
