= Monalazone =

Chemical compound

Clinical data
- Trade names: Naclobenz-Natrium, Spergisin, Speton
- Other names: p-(Chlorosulfamoyl)benzoic acid
- Routes of administration: Vaginal
- Drug class: Disinfectant
- ATC code: None

Identifiers
- IUPAC name: 4-(chlorosulfamoyl)benzoic acid
- CAS Number: 106145-03-3 61477-95-0 (disodium)
- PubChem CID: 68809
- ChemSpider: 62045
- UNII: 2UP9F49N8H
- ChEMBL: ChEMBL2110958
- CompTox Dashboard (EPA): DTXSID70147532

Chemical and physical data
- Formula: C_{7}H_{6}ClNO_{4}S
- Molar mass: 235.64 g·mol^{−1}
- 3D model (JSmol): Interactive image
- SMILES: C1=CC(=CC=C1C(=O)O)S(=O)(=O)NCl
- InChI: InChI=1S/C7H6ClNO4S/c8-9-14(12,13)6-3-1-5(2-4-6)7(10)11/h1-4,9H,(H,10,11); Key:WGHSWNHOFPGMKJ-UHFFFAOYSA-N

Monalazone, used as monalazone disodium (INN; the disodium salt) and sold under the brand names Naclobenz-Natrium, Spergisin, and Speton, is a vaginal disinfectant or antiseptic and spermicidal contraceptive. It is a sulfonylbenzoic acid derivative and is closely related structurally to halazone. The compound was synthesized in 1937. A vaginal tablet combination of 0.125 mg estradiol benzoate and 10 mg monalazone was previously marketed under the brand name Malun 25.
