= LifeStraw =

Brand of water filtration and purification devices

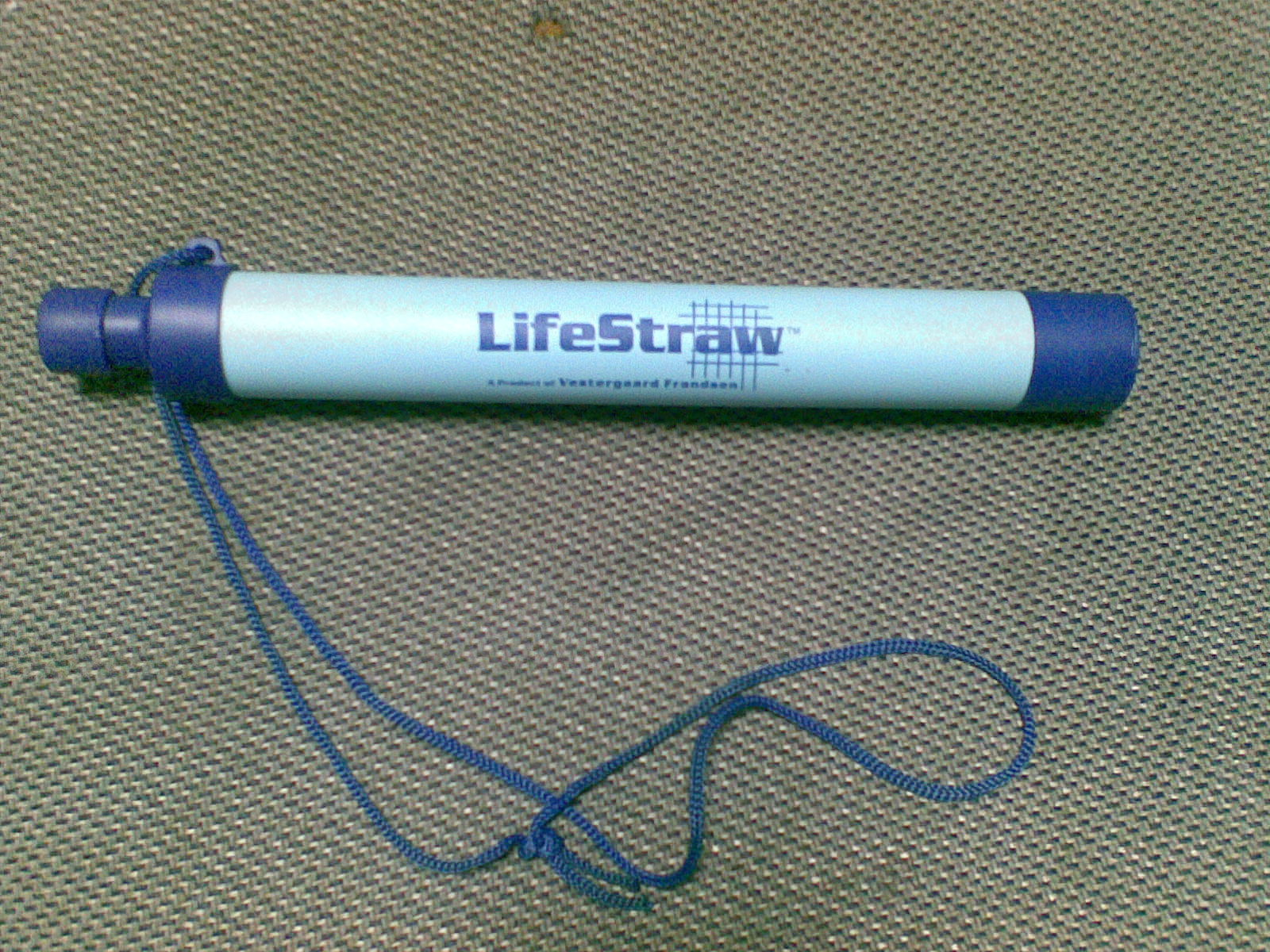
A LifeStraw

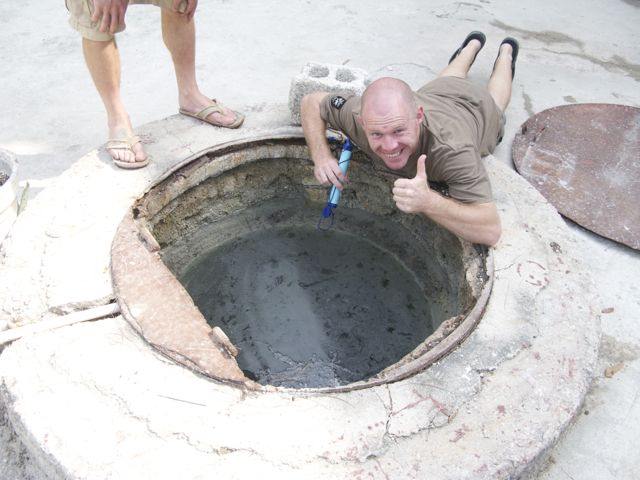
Use of LifeStraw

LifeStraw is a brand of water filtration and purification devices. The original LifeStraw was designed as a portable water filter "straw". It filters a maximum of 4,000 litres of water, and enough for one person for three years. It removes almost all waterborne bacteria, microplastics and germs. A bottle was later developed which incorporated a LifeStraw cartridge into a 650-millilitre (22 US fl oz) BPA-free plastic sports water bottle. In addition to these portable filters, the manufacturer produces high-volume purifiers powered by gravity that also remove viruses. These are designed for family and community use.

The water filters are designed by the Swiss-based Vestergaard Frandsen. While originally developed for people living in developing nations and for distribution in humanitarian crisis, the filters have gained popularity as consumer products. The device is now used as a tool for survivalists and outdoor enthusiasts in addition to being used to help combat clean water scarcity worldwide. The filters can provide clean water without the need for batteries or chemical treatment. They are made using hollow fiber membrane technology. Some of them also incorporate an activated carbon component.

Contrary to popular belief, the original device does not incorporate a reverse-osmosis membrane nor is it able to filter out salts or minerals.

== History ==
The devices were distributed in the 2010 Haiti earthquake, 2010 Pakistan floods, 2011 Thailand floods, and 2016 Ecuador earthquake, among other crises and initiatives. In the Mutomo District in Kenya which has suffered from long term drought, the Kenya Red Cross supplied filters to 3,750 school children and 6,750 households. In 2015, they were deployed in Rwanda. The company funds a retail give back program that as of 2018 has provided safe water to more than 1 million school children in rural Kenya.

== Construction ==
The original LifeStraw is a plastic tube 22 centimetres (8 5/8 in) long and 3 centimetres (1 1/8 in) in diameter. Water that is drawn up through the straw first passes through hollow fibres that filter water particles down to 0.2 μm across, using only physical filtration methods and no chemicals. The entire process is powered by suction, similar to using a conventional drinking straw, and filters up to 4,000 litres (1,100 US gal) of water.

While the initial model of the filter did not remove Giardia lamblia, current models claim to remove a minimum of 99.999% of waterborne protozoan parasites including Giardia, Cryptosporidium and microplastics. The original device does not filter viruses, chemicals, salt water, and heavy metals, but newer versions of the product, (like LifeStraw Go Series or LifeStraw Home) are advertised as being capable of removing chemicals and heavy metals including lead.

== Critical response ==
LifeStraw has been generally praised for its effective and quick method of bacteria and protozoa removal and consumer acceptability.

Although the devices are available for retail sale in the US and Europe, the majority are distributed as part of public health campaigns or in response to complex emergencies by NGOs and organizations that give them away for free in the developing world.

LifeStraw has been praised in the international media and won several awards including the 2008 Saatchi & Saatchi Award for World Changing Ideas, the 'INDEX: 2005' International Design Award and "Best Invention of 2005" by Time Magazine. It was featured in the Museum of Modern Art in New York. In 2019, the Lifestraw Home water filter pitcher was launched and won the IDEA design award and the Red Dot design award.

== See also ==
- Tata Swach
- Ceramic water filter
- Slingshot (water vapor distillation system)
