= IBOT =

Powered wheelchair

iBOT
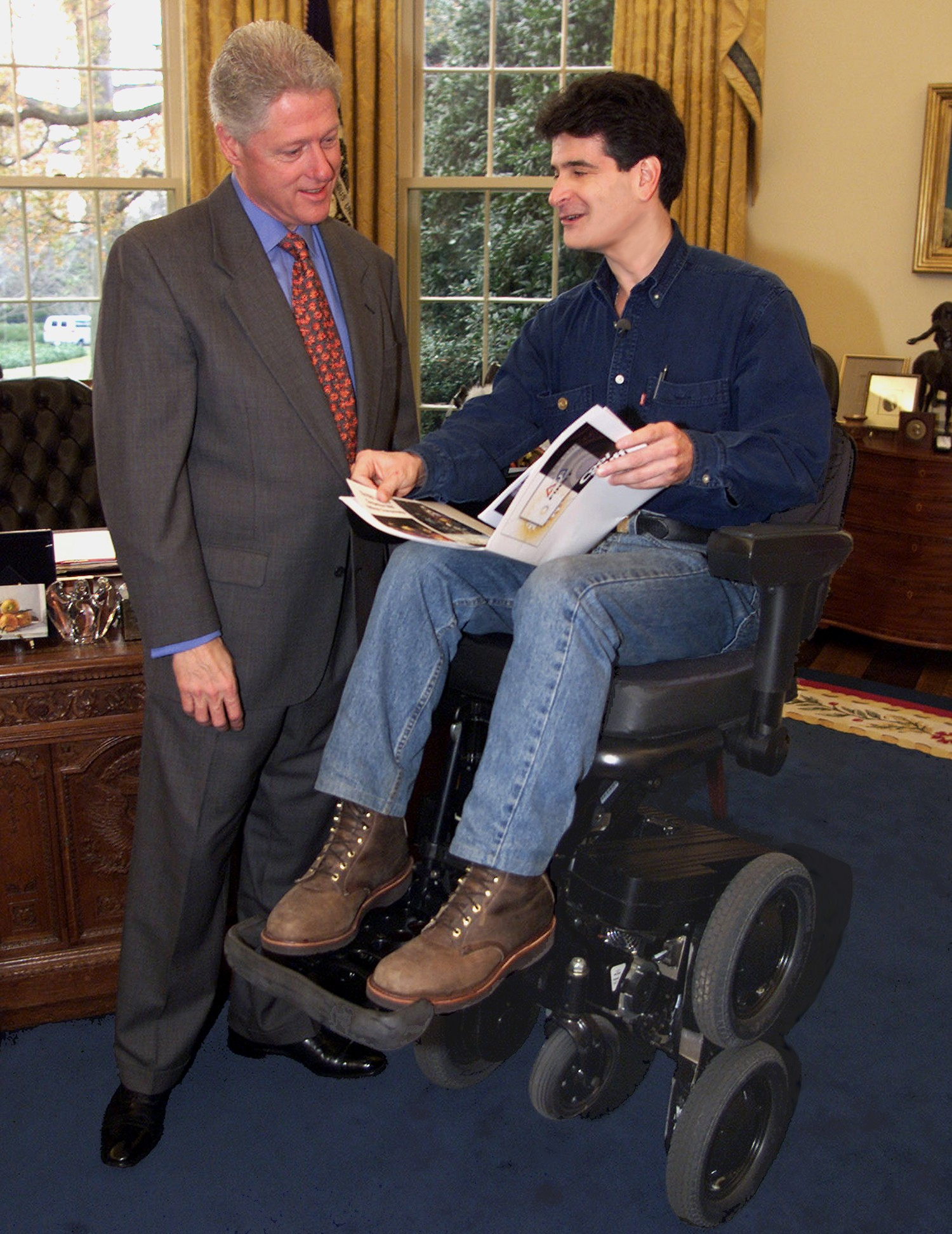
- Inventor Dean Kamen demonstrating Balance Mode in a preproduction iBOT 3000 to President Bill Clinton at the White House, 2000
- Classification: Electronics
- Industry: Transportation
- Application: Conveyance
- Fuel source: Electric
- Self-propelled: yes
- Wheels: 6
- Inventor: DEKA

The iBOT is a powered wheelchair that uses gyroscopic technology to provide multiple operating modes for varied indoor and outdoor terrain.

The current version, the iBOT® PMD, has been manufactured by Mobius Mobility since 2019. The device was developed by Dean Kamen’s DEKA Research & Development Corp. in partnership with Johnson & Johnson's Independence Technology division. Early versions were produced by Independence Technology from 2003 to 2009.

== Description ==
The iBOT uses gyroscopic technology together with four powered drive wheels and two caster wheels to provide several distinct driving modes. In its 4-wheel mode, it has only the four drive wheels on the ground, enabling it to handle outdoor terrain such as curbs, sand, and snow. In its standard mode, it has two of the drive wheels plus the caster wheels on the ground, and functions as a conventional rear-wheel-drive powered wheelchair.

Additional modes include balance mode, which raises a user to eye-level height by balancing on two drive wheels, and stair mode, which enables a trained user to ascend and descend stairs.

== History ==
=== Development ===
Development of the iBOT started in 1990 at DEKA Research & Development in Manchester, NH. The first working prototype was available in 1992, and in 1994, DEKA signed a deal with Johnson & Johnson to manufacture the device.

The iBOT was revealed to the public on Dateline NBC in a segment by John Hockenberry on June 30, 1999. By this time, Johnson & Johnson had already spent US$50 million on the project. On Art Bell’s Coast to Coast AM show (16 Mar 2001) investigative reporter Robert Steensen discussed Dean Kamen's secretive invention, "Project Ginger" or “It”, that would later be released as iBOT and The Segway. The iBOT was cleared by the FDA as a Class III device on August 13, 2003.

The Segway PT, a non-medical device, was spun off during product development of the iBOT, leveraging the same core technology. During development, the iBOT was nicknamed Fred, short for Fred Upstairs, a pun on Fred Astaire, while the Segway was nicknamed Ginger, after Fred Astaire’s dance partner Ginger Rogers. The Segway PT was released in 2001.

=== iBOT 3000 and iBOT 4000 ===
Johnson & Johnson formed Independence Technology to bring the iBOT to the market. The original iBOT 3000 entered production in 2003, and was superseded by the iBOT 4000 in 2005.

Due to the FDA classification, the iBOT 3000 and iBOT 4000 could not have any modifications made to their seating or controllers, meaning they could not be customized to individual users. Additionally, insurance coverage was minimal for these devices, which sold for $25,000-$28,000. Only 500 units were sold, and Johnson & Johnson discontinued production in 2009.

=== iBOT PMD ===
In late 2014, Kamen announced that the FDA had reclassified the iBOT from a Class III to a Class II medical device. This lowering of regulatory controls allowed DEKA to revive the dormant iBOT and start development on a next generation product.

In 2019, the next generation iBOT PMD (Personal Mobility Device) was released to market by Mobius Mobility in Manchester, NH. The iBOT PMD retains the same core modes of operation from the earlier generations, but is lighter, has improved seating options, and has updated electronics throughout.

The FDA has granted the iBOT PMD both the IMK (Wheelchair, Stair Climbing) and ITI (Wheelchair, Powered) product codes.
