= Dean of Invention =

- Genre: Documentary
- Starring: Dean Kamen; Joanne Colan
- Country of origin: United States
- Original language: English
- No. of episodes: 8

Original release
- Network: Planet Green
- Release: October 22 – December 3, 2010

Dean of Invention is a television show starring Dean Kamen and Joanne Colan that premiered on Planet Green on October 22, 2010. The two explored scientific breakthroughs around the world in a variety of fields including aviation, biotechnology, energy, nanotechnology and robotics. The goal of the show was to promote engineering and technology as fun, accessible, and important.

At commercial breaks, Dean Kamen made personal appeals for FIRST as a condition of his involvement with the show.

== Episodes ==
=== Meet the Microbots ===
"Meet the Microbots" was an exploration of nanotechnology and its applications to medicine.

=== Building the Bionic Body ===
"Building the Bionic Body" explored advances in prosthetics and their use, especially by the US military.

=== Wired Brain ===
"Wired Brain" investigated interfaces between the human brain and computers to eliminate handicaps such as muteness or paralysis.

=== Robot Revolution ===
"Robot Revolution" discussed applications of robots to perform difficult or hazardous tasks in lieu of humans.

=== Gonzo for Guano ===
"Gonzo for Guano" investigated potential energy production from excrement.

=== Forward Motion ===
"Forward Motion" explored innovations in automobile technology including electric cars and driverless cars.

=== Future Flight ===
"Future Flight" followed the pursuit of flying cars, including the Terrafugia Transition.

=== Re-Gen Revolution ===
"Re-Gen Revolution" discussed the possibilities of improving organ donation by creating them artificially.
