= Safe Water System =

The Safe Water System (SWS) is a series of inexpensive technologies that can be applied as water quality interventions in developing countries. It was developed in conjunction by the US Centers for Disease Control and Prevention and the Pan American Health Organization. As of 2014, SWS had been implemented in thirty-five countries.

== Background ==
As of 2012, 780 million people lack access to an improved water source and 2.5 billion people (half of all people in developing countries) lack access to adequate sanitation. Inadequate water sanitation is a public health hazard, as it is a major source of diarrheal illnesses such as cholera. Diarrheal illnesses are a significant source of mortality for children, killing more children than the combined mortality of measles, malaria, and AIDS. For children under five, diarrheal disease is the second-leading cause of death worldwide.

== History and methods ==
In 1992, the US Centers for Disease Control and Prevention (CDC) and the Pan American Health Organization collaborated to reduce waterborne diseases in developing countries. They called the new methodology the Safe Water System (SWS); it consisted of three components:

- Water treatment at point of use with a locally made diluted bleach solution
- Preventing recontamination of water by safely storing treated water in containers with narrow mouths, lids, and spigots
- Education to improve the handling and sanitation of food and water

From 1994 to 1995, the CDC implemented the SWS in Bolivia in a pilot experiment, where it improved water quality and reduced diarrheal illness by 40%. Following the success of the program in Bolivia, the CDC received permission from the Zambian Ministry of Health to conduct field trials in 1998 in Kitwe, Zambia. Compared to the control group, the households that received the SWS and education on best hygiene practices experienced a 48% reduced risk of diarrheal disease. In response to marketing efforts by the CDC, the sanitizing solution, sold as Clorin, experienced a steep increase in demand in Zambia. In 1999, about 187,000 bottles of Clorin were sold; in 2004, over 1.8 million bottles were sold. Each bottle sanitizes enough water for one month for a family of six. Clorin is subsidized by the United States Agency for International Development (USAID); as of 2003, each bottle is sold for US$0.09, with USAID paying $0.33 per bottle (each bottle therefore has a net cost of $0.24 to USAID).

Household water treatment now encompasses other methods, such as use of flocculants that cause contaminants within water to sink to the bottom of a container or float at the top where they can be more easily removed. Methods like disinfectant powder, solar water disinfection, ceramic filtration, and slow sand filtration are also incorporated.

== Impact ==
From 1998 to 2014, the CDC implemented the SWS program in thirty-five countries. During this time period, they distributed enough sanitizing agents to clean over 137 billion liters of water. Products that the CDC has distributed as part of the Safe Water Systems includes the three-component system initially piloted in Bolivia, as well as water treatment tablets. SWS has been implemented in the following countries:

- Afghanistan
- Angola
- Benin
- Botswana
- Burkina Faso
- Burma (Myanmar)
- Burundi
- Cambodia
- Cameroon
- Côte d'Ivoire
- Democratic Republic of Congo
- Dominican Republic
- Eswatini
- Ethiopia
- Guinea
- Haiti
- India
- Kenya
- Liberia
- Madagascar
- Malawi
- Mali
- Mozambique
- Namibia
- Nepal
- Nigeria
- Pakistan
- Papua New Guinea
- Republic of Congo (Brazzaville)
- Rwanda
- Senegal
- South Sudan
- Swaziland
- Tanzania
- Uganda
- Uzbekistan
- Vietnam
- Zambia
- Zimbabwe

Because the goal of the SWS interventions is to reduce the incidence of water-borne illness, SWS technologies do not mitigate other hazards in water such as chemical contaminants. Studies of SWS interventions showed a reduction of diarrhea by 24% in Bangladesh, 25% in Guatemala, and 30% among people with HIV in rural Uganda.
