= North Dumpling Island =

Island in Fishers Island Sound, New York

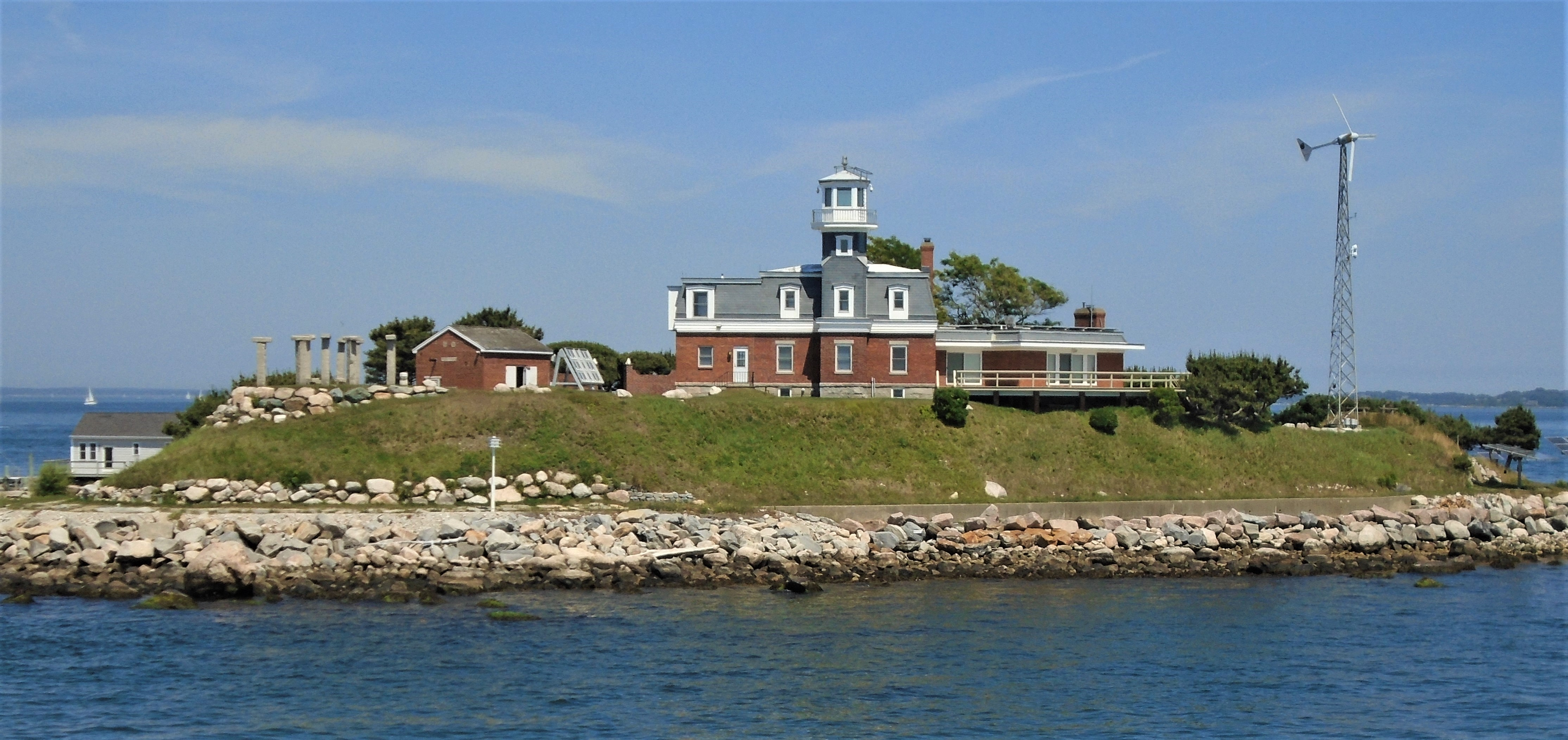
- (2022)

Geography
- Location: Fishers Island Sound, Southold, New York
- Coordinates: 41°17′17″N 72°01′08″W

Administration
- United States

North Dumpling Island is a two-acre (8,100 m^{2}) island in Fishers Island Sound of Long Island Sound, one mi (1.6 km) off the coast of Connecticut, south of Groton, within the territory of the town of Southold on Long Island in New York State. The island is about 0.3 nmi (560 m) north of South Dumpling Island, and is home to the North Dumpling Light, which dates from 1859. The island is privately owned by Dean Kamen, inventor of the Segway.

== History ==
In 1639, John Winthrop, son of the governor of the Massachusetts Bay Colony, bought Fishers Island and the small islets around it, including those called "The Dumplings". Ownership of the islands, including North Dumpling, remained with the Winthrop family until 1847, when it was sold to the federal government for $600 ($20,732 in 2025) to be the site of a lighthouse. The lighthouse and the keeper's dwelling were built and the light illuminated in 1859, and then rebuilt in 1871 with a taller tower. The lighthouse was deactivated in 1959, being replaced by an automated light on a skeleton tower, and the grounds and lighthouse were sold to a private party, George Washburn. The island was purchased in 1977 by David Levitt, president of the Doughnut Corporation of America, who remodeled and expanded the house. Levitt convinced the Coast Guard to move the light back to the stone tower and to remove the skeleton tower. Levitt added sculptures to the island, including Temple of the Four Winds, the Moon Rock, and Meditation Rock. In 1986, Dean Kamen, inventor of the Segway and founder of FIRST, purchased the island for US$2,500,000 ($7.34 million in 2025).

After a denial from local officials to build his own wind turbine on the island, Kamen "seceded" from the United States. Although Kamen's secession is not legally recognized, he still refers to the island as the "Kingdom of North Dumpling" and has established a constitution, a flag, a currency (the dumpling), a national anthem, which is a parody of the song "America the Beautiful" written by Paul Lazarus, and a navy consisting of a single amphibious vehicle. The people of North Dumpling are called "Dumplonians", and Kamen is said to refer to himself as "Lord Dumpling" or "Lord Dumpling II".

Despite still being a part of the United States, Kamen claimed he was able to leverage his personal relationship with then-president George H. W. Bush to sign an unofficial non-aggression pact.

Kamen was eventually able to build his turbine, and the island's electrical system was later converted to a combination of wind and solar power with the help of Fritz Morgan, Chief Technology Officer of Philips Color Kinetics, operating independently of the regional electrical grid. This was accomplished by replacing all lighting on the island with LEDs, which resulted in a 70% reduction of in-house energy consumption. Kamen says that the island is carbon neutral due to solar panels on every building, a 10 kW wind turbine, and a "little" Stirling engine for backup power.

In addition to North Dumpling Lighthouse, the island features a replica of Stonehenge.

== Gallery ==
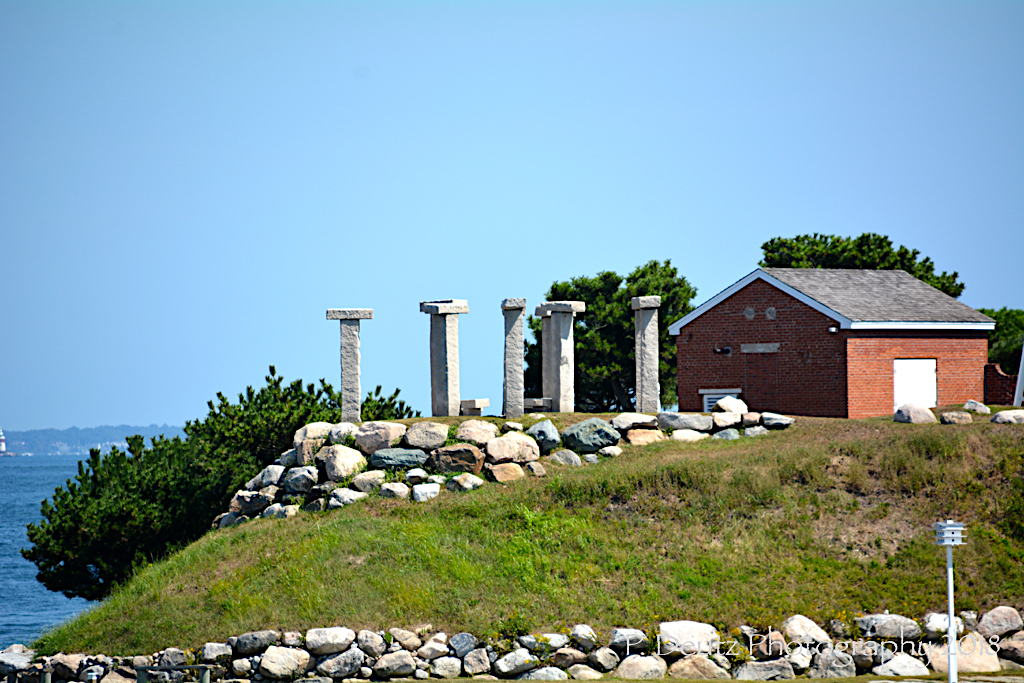
North Dumpling Island's Stonehenge

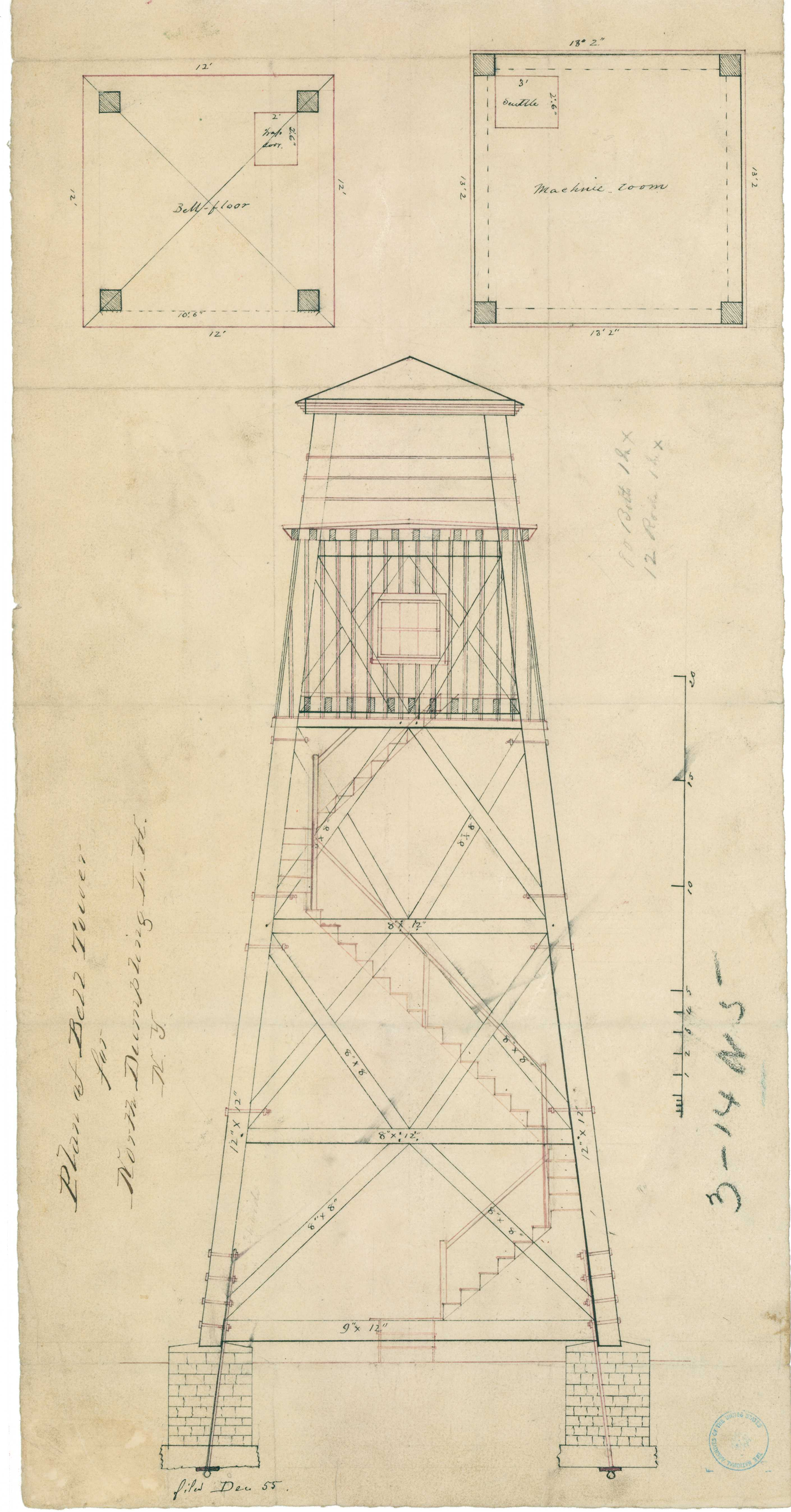
Department of Commerce. Bureau of Lighthouses. (Date: 1913 — July 1, 1939)

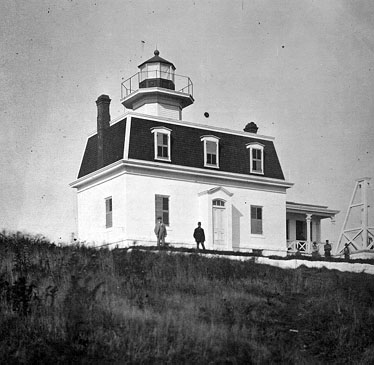
North Dumpling Lighthouse - off Fisher's Island - Long Island Sound (Date: unknown)
