= DEKA (company) =

American technology company

DEKA Research & Development Corporation

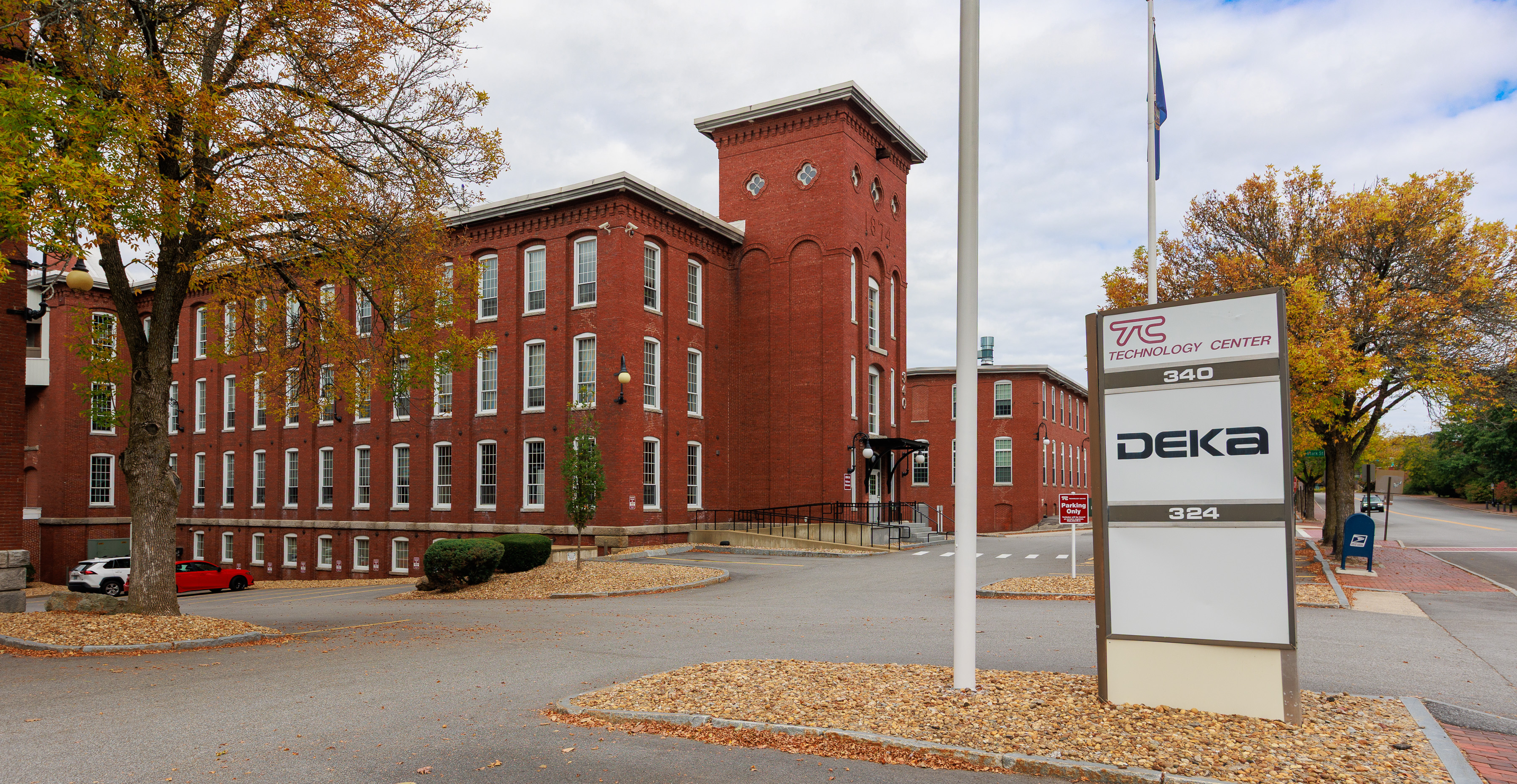
- DEKA offices
- Company type: Private
- Founded: 1982; 44 years ago
- Founder: Dean Kamen
- Headquarters: Manchester, New Hampshire
- Key people: Dean Kamen (CEO)
- Products: Research & Development
- Website: www.dekaresearch.com

DEKA Research & Development Corporation is a technology company based in New Hampshire, U.S., founded in 1982 by Dean Kamen, consisting of over 1000 engineers, technicians, and support staff. DEKA is an acronym derived from Dean Kamen. The company is located in a series of old Amoskeag Falls Millyard buildings in Manchester, New Hampshire; Kamen has real estate investments in the neighborhood beyond DEKA offices, contributing to revitalization of the neighborhood along with other major investors.

== Products ==
- IBOT wheelchair, licensed to Johnson & Johnson
- The HomeChoice, Amia, and Kaguya families of portable dialysis machine, licensed to Baxter Healthcare
- Stirling engine technologies
- Stent
- Segway, a personal transporter
- Therakos
- Slingshot, portable water purification system
- Luke Arm, a DARPA project
- Silicone Ankle Foot Orthosis (SAFO) and FLO-TECH APOPPS, adjustable postoperative protective and preparatory systems to protect injuries during early rehabilitation, both spun off to Next Step Orthotics & Prosthetics, Inc.
- Microdispensing contractor for the development of Coca Cola Freestyle.

== Electric vehicles ==
Dean Kamen has developed a series plug-in hybrid car using a Ford Think and a Stirling engine. DEKA has shown off its new electric car, the DEKA Revolt, a two-seat hatchback that can achieve a range of about 60 miles (97 km) on a single charge of its lithium battery. The Stirling engine is used for cabin heat, windshield defrosting and battery recharging.

Stirling engines can use any fuel and are affordable for the average consumer.

Kamen's team has also folded it into a hybridized Th!nk City as the on-board generator for the electric drive system.

In 2009, development of the two-wheeled Personal Urban Mobility and Accessibility (PUMA) vehicle was announced in cooperation with General Motors.

== Awards and philanthropy ==
Dean Kamen was awarded the National Medal of Technology in 2000 by then President Clinton for inventions that have advanced medical care worldwide.

In 2003, his "Project Slingshot", a cheap portable water purification system, was named a runner-up for coolest invention of 2003 by Time magazine. Dean Kamen appeared on The Colbert Report showing off his water purifier by dumping Doritos into a red liquid, and having it purify the red liquid into a clear colorless pure water.

DEKA is a major sponsor and strategic partner of FIRST, also founded by Dean Kamen.

== See also ==
- Cryocooler
