= Slingshot (water purification system) =

Water purification device

Slingshot is a water purification device created by inventor Dean Kamen. Powered by a Stirling engine running on a combustible fuel source, it claims to be able to produce drinking water from almost any source by means of vapor compression distillation, requires no filters, and can operate using cow dung as fuel.

The name of the machine is a reference to the sling used by David to defeat Goliath.

== Technical characteristics ==
In his TEDMED 2010 presentation, Kamen announced several goals for and characteristics of the machine:

- five years of operation without overhaul or maintenance
- use less than a kilowatt of power (lower than the power consumption of a microwave oven)
- generate 1000 litres of pure water/day, enough for 100 people for hygiene and cooking
- meets the U.S. pharmacopoeic standard for water for injections
- requires no pre-treatment, pipelines, engineers, consumables (osmosis membranes, charcoal, etc.), or installation permits

== History ==
Kamen came to develop the device based on statistics that showed a lack of access to clean water as a public health crisis. Statistics from the World Health Organization show that there are 900 million people worldwide without a readily available supply of drinking water and that some 3.5 million people die annually because of diseases resulting from the consumption of unsanitary water. Even though over two-thirds of the Earth's surface is covered with water, only 1% of it is potable.

Kamen sought to develop a technology that would transform the 97% of water that is undrinkable into water that can be used and consumed on the spot, readily and inexpensively. The device takes contaminated water and runs it through a vapor compression distiller that produces clean water, producing 250 gallons daily (~946 litres), enough for 100 people. The test devices have been used with "anything that looks wet", including polluted river water, saline ocean water, and raw sewage. In a demonstration at a technology conference in October 2004, Kamen ran his own urine through the machine and drank the clean water that came out.

Kamen built two machines — a power generator that would output one kilowatt from "anything that burns", and the water distiller, which uses the electricity. In 2005, the power generator was tested for six months in a village in Bangladesh and generated enough electricity to light 70 energy-efficient light bulbs. The hand-made prototype cost US$100,000 each.

By the end of 2005, a team of 200 at DEKA had produced 30 units, each the size of a compact refrigerator. A pair of Slingshot devices ran successfully for a month in a village in Honduras during the summer of 2006. While the initial devices cost hundreds of thousands of dollars, Kamen hopes that increased economies of scale will allow production machines to be made available for $2,000 each.

In 2008, Kamen demonstrated the device on The Colbert Report.

In his TEDMED 2010 presentation, Kamen lamented throughout that when he asked for "a few million dollars" over a few months, no large global health organizations supported the development. Later in the presentation, he announced a partnership with The Coca-Cola Company.

In 2011, field tests of Slingshot in five towns in Ghana proved their effectiveness and durability.

In October 2012, Kamen and Coca-Cola CEO Muhtar Kent announced at the Clinton Global Initiative that in collaboration with DEKA Research, Africare and Inter-American Development Bank, they will start bringing the Slingshot to rural parts of Latin America and Africa. The first initiative will be testing the Slingshot technology in health centers and schools in remote communities in Latin America in 2013.

== Proposed development ==
Kamen hopes to send thousands of the units with local village entrepreneurs, in much the same way independent cell phone businesses have thrived and gradually changed the face of many impoverished areas around the globe. Future target price for the device is in the $1,000 to $2,000 range.

As of 2020, the product does not seem to be in commercial production or wide use. Kamen invented the Coca-Cola Freestyle soda dispenser in return for the Coca-Cola corporation to release the Slingshot world wide. The systems were instead distributed as a component of EKOCENTER kiosks, of which only 150 have been deployed worldwide.

== See also ==
- Biosand filter, a point-of-use water treatment system adapted from traditional slow sand filters
- LifeStraw, designed by Vestergaard Frandsen
- LifeSaver bottle, designed by Michael Pritchard
- Tata Swach
- Sono arsenic filter, developed by Abul Hussam of George Mason University
