= Vapor-compression evaporation =

Evaporation method

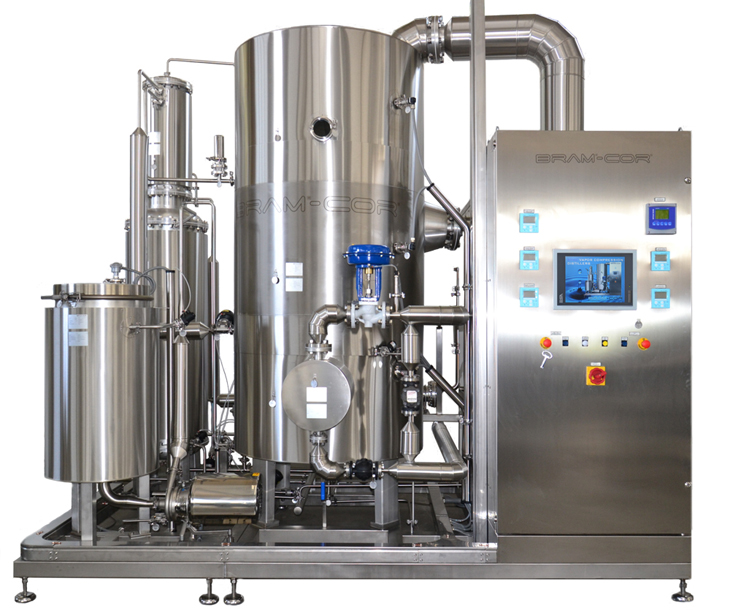
Vapor compression distiller made by BRAM-COR (Italy)

Vapor-compression evaporation is the evaporation method by which a blower, compressor or jet ejector is used to compress, and thus, increase the pressure of the vapor produced. Since the pressure increase of the vapor also generates an increase in the condensation temperature, the same vapor can serve as the heating medium for its "mother" liquid or solution being concentrated, from which the vapor was generated to begin with. If no compression was provided, the vapor would be at the same temperature as the boiling liquid/solution, and no heat transfer could take place.

It is also sometimes called vapor compression distillation (VCD). If compression is performed by a mechanically driven compressor or blower, this evaporation process is usually referred to as MVR (mechanical vapor recompression). In case of compression performed by high pressure motive steam ejectors, the process is usually called thermocompression, steam compression or ejectocompression.

== MVR process ==
=== Energy input ===
In this case the energy input to the system lies in the pumping energy of the compressor. The theoretical energy consumption will be equal to $E=Q*(H2-H1)$, where

- E is the total theoretical pumping energy
- Q is the mass of vapors passing through the compressor
- H_{1}, H_{2} are the total heat content of unit mass of vapors, respectively upstream and downstream the compressor.

In SI units, these are respectively measured in kJ, kg and kJ/kg.

The actual energy input will be greater than the theoretical value and will depend on the efficiency of the system, which is usually between 30% and 60%. For example, suppose the theoretical energy input is 300 kJ and the efficiency is 30%. The actual energy input would be 300 x 100/30 = 1,000 kJ.

In a large unit, the compression power is between 35 and 45 kW per metric ton of compressed vapors.

=== Equipment for MVR evaporators ===
The compressor is necessarily the core of the unit. Compressors used for this application are usually of the centrifugal type, or positive displacement units such as the Roots blowers, similar to the (much smaller) Roots type supercharger. Very large units (evaporation capacity 100 metric tons per hour or more) sometimes use Axial-flow compressors. The compression work will deliver the steam superheated if compared to the theoretical pressure/temperature equilibrium. For this reason, the vast majority of MVR units feature a desuperheater between the compressor and the main heat exchanger.

== Thermocompression ==
=== Energy input ===
The energy input is here given by the energy of a quantity of steam (motive steam), at a pressure higher than those of both the inlet and the outlet vapors. The quantity of compressed vapors is therefore higher than the inlet : $Qd = Qs + Qm$
Where Q_{d} is the steam quantity at ejector delivery, Q_{s} at ejector suction and Q_{m} is the motive steam quantity. For this reason, a thermocompression evaporator often features a vapor condenser, due to the possible excess of steam necessary for the compression if compared with the steam required to evaporate the solution. The quantity Q_{m} of motive steam per unit suction quantity is a function of both the motive ratio of motive steam pressure vs. suction pressure and the compression ratio of delivery pressure vs. suction pressure. In principle, the higher the compression ratio and the lower the motive ratio the higher will be the specific motive steam consumption, i. e. the less efficient the energy balance.

=== Thermocompression equipment ===
The heart of any thermocompression evaporator is clearly the steam ejector, exhaustively described in the relevant page. The size of the other pieces of equipment, such as the main heat exchanger, the vapor head, etc. (see evaporator for details), is governed by the evaporation process.

== Comparison ==
These two compression-type evaporators have different fields of application, although they do sometimes overlap.

- An MVR unit will be preferable for a large unit, thanks to the reduced energy consumption. The largest single body MVR evaporator built (1968, by Whiting Co., later Swenson Evaporator Co., Harvey, Ill. in Cirò Marina, Italy) was a salt crystallizer, evaporating approximately 400 metric tons per hour of water, featuring an axial-flow compressor (Brown Boveri, later ABB). This unit was transformed around 1990 to become the first effect of a multiple effect evaporator. MVR evaporators with 10 tons or more evaporating capacity are common.
- The compression ratio in a MVR unit does not usually exceed 1.8. At a compression ratio of 1.8, if the evaporation is performed at atmospheric pressure (0.101 MPa), the condensation pressure after compression will be 0.101 x 1.8 = 0.1818 [MPa]. At this pressure, the condensation temperature of the water vapor at the heat exchanger will be 390 K. Taking into account the boiling point elevation of the salt water we wish to evaporate (8 K for a saturated salt solution), this leaves a temperature difference of less than 8 K at the heat exchanger. A small ∆T leads to slow heat transfer, meaning that we will need a very large heating surface to transfer the required heat. Axial-flow and Roots compressor may reach slightly higher compression ratios.
- Thermocompression evaporators may reach higher compression ratios - at a cost. A compression ratio of 2 is possible (and sometimes more) but unless the motive steam is at a reasonably high pressure (say, 16 bar g - 250 psig - or more), the motive steam consumption will be in the range of 2 kg per kg of suction vapors. A higher compression ratio means a smaller heat exchanger, and a reduced investment cost. Moreover, a compressor is an expensive machine, while an ejector is much simpler and cheap.

As a conclusion, MVR machines are used in large, energy-efficient units, while thermocompression units tend to limit their use to small units, where energy consumption is not a big issue.

== Efficiency ==
The efficiency and feasibility of this process depends on the efficiency of the compressing device (e.g., blower, compressor or steam ejector) and the heat transfer coefficient attained in the heat exchanger contacting the condensing vapor and the boiling "mother" solution/liquid. Theoretically, if the resulting condensate is subcooled, this process could allow full recovery of the latent heat of vaporization that would otherwise be lost if the vapor, rather than the condensate, was the final product; therefore, this method of evaporation is very energy efficient. The evaporation process may be solely driven by the mechanical work provided by the compressing device.

== Some uses ==
=== Clean water production ===
A vapor-compression evaporator, like most evaporators, can make reasonably clean water from any water source. In a salt crystallizer, for example, a typical analysis of the resulting condensate shows a typical content of residual salt not higher than 50 ppm or, in terms of electrical conductance, not higher than 10 μS/cm. This results in a drinkable water, if the other sanitary requirements are fulfilled. While this cannot compete in the marketplace with reverse osmosis or demineralization, vapor compression chiefly differs from these thanks to its ability to make clean water from saturated or even crystallizing brines with total dissolved solids (TDS) up to 650 g/L. The other two technologies can make clean water from sources no higher in TDS than approximately 35 g/L.

For economic reasons evaporators are seldom operated on low-TDS water sources. Those applications are filled by reverse osmosis. The already brackish water which enters a typical evaporator is concentrated further. The increased dissolved solids act to increase the boiling point well beyond that of pure water. Seawater with a TDS of approximately 30 g/L exhibits a boiling point elevation of less than 1 K but saturated sodium chloride solution at 360 g/L has a boiling point elevation of about 7 K. This boiling point elevation is a challenge for vapor-compression evaporation in that it increases the pressure ratio that the steam compressor must attain to effect vaporization. Since boiling point elevation determines the pressure ratio in the compressor, it is the main overall factor in operating costs.

=== Steam-assisted gravity drainage ===
The technology used today to extract bitumen from the Athabasca oil sands is the water-intensive steam-assisted gravity drainage (SAGD) method. In the late 1990s former nuclear engineer Bill Heins of General Electric Company's RCC Thermal Products conceived an evaporator technology called falling film or mechanical vapor compression evaporation. In 1999 and 2002 Petro-Canada's MacKay River facility was the first to install 1999 and 2002 GE SAGD zero-liquid discharge (ZLD) systems using a combination of the new evaporative technology and crystallizer system in which all the water was recycled and only solids were discharged off site. This new evaporative technology began to replace older water treatment techniques employed by SAGD facilities which involved the use of warm lime softening to remove silica and magnesium and weak acid cation ion exchange used to remove calcium. The vapor-compression evaporation process replaced the once-through steam generators (OTSG) traditionally used for steam production. OTSG generally ran on natural gas which in 2008 had become increasingly valuable. The water quality of evaporators is four times better which is needed for the drum boilers. The evaporators, when coupled with standard drum boilers, produce steam which is more "reliable, less costly to operate, and less water-intensive." By 2008 about 85 per cent of SAGD facilities in the Alberta oil sands had adopted evaporative technology. "SAGD, unlike other thermal processes such as cyclic steam stimulation (CSS), requires 100 per cent quality steam."

== See also ==
- Cristiani compressed steam system
- Slingshot (water vapor distillation system)
- Vapor-compression refrigeration
- Vapor-compression desalination
