= Dean Kamen =

American businessman (born 1951)

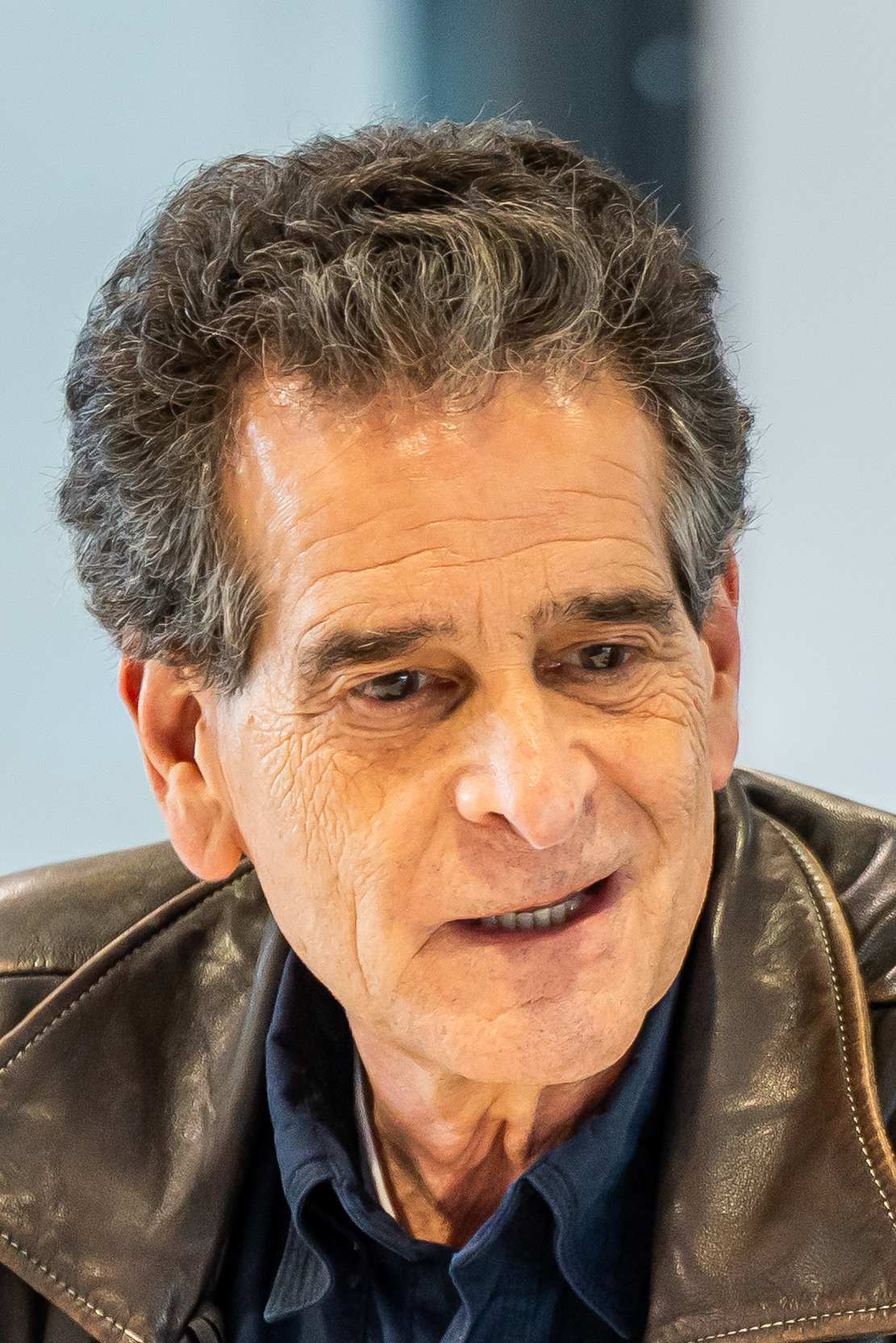
- Kamen in 2025
- Born: Dean Lawrence Kamen; April 5, 1951 (age 75); Rockville Centre, New York, U.S.
- Known for: Invention of the iBot Wheelchair, the Segway and founder of FIRST; North Dumpling Island
- Parents: Jack Kamen (father); Evelyn Kamen (born Rothenberg) (mother)
- Awards: Hoover Medal; Heinz Award in Technology, the Economy and Employment; National Medal of Technology and Innovation; Lemelson–MIT Prize; ASME Medal; Lindbergh Award; Global Humanitarian Award

Dean Lawrence Kamen (/ˈkeɪmɛn/; born April 5, 1951) is an American engineer, inventor, and businessman. He is known for his invention of the Segway and iBOT, as well as founding the non-profit organization FIRST with Woodie Flowers. Kamen holds over 1,000 patents.

== Early life and family ==
Dean Lawrence Kamen was born on April 5, 1951, on Long Island, New York, to Jack Kamen and Evelyn Kamen (born Rothenberg). The Kamen family is Jewish. His father was an illustrator for Mad, Weird Science, and other EC Comics publications. During his teenage years, Kamen was already being paid for his ideas; local bands and museums paid him to build light and sound systems. His annual earnings reached $60,000 before his high school graduation.

He attended Worcester Polytechnic Institute, but dropped out in 1976 before graduating, after five years of private advanced research for the insulin pump AutoSyringe.

== Career ==
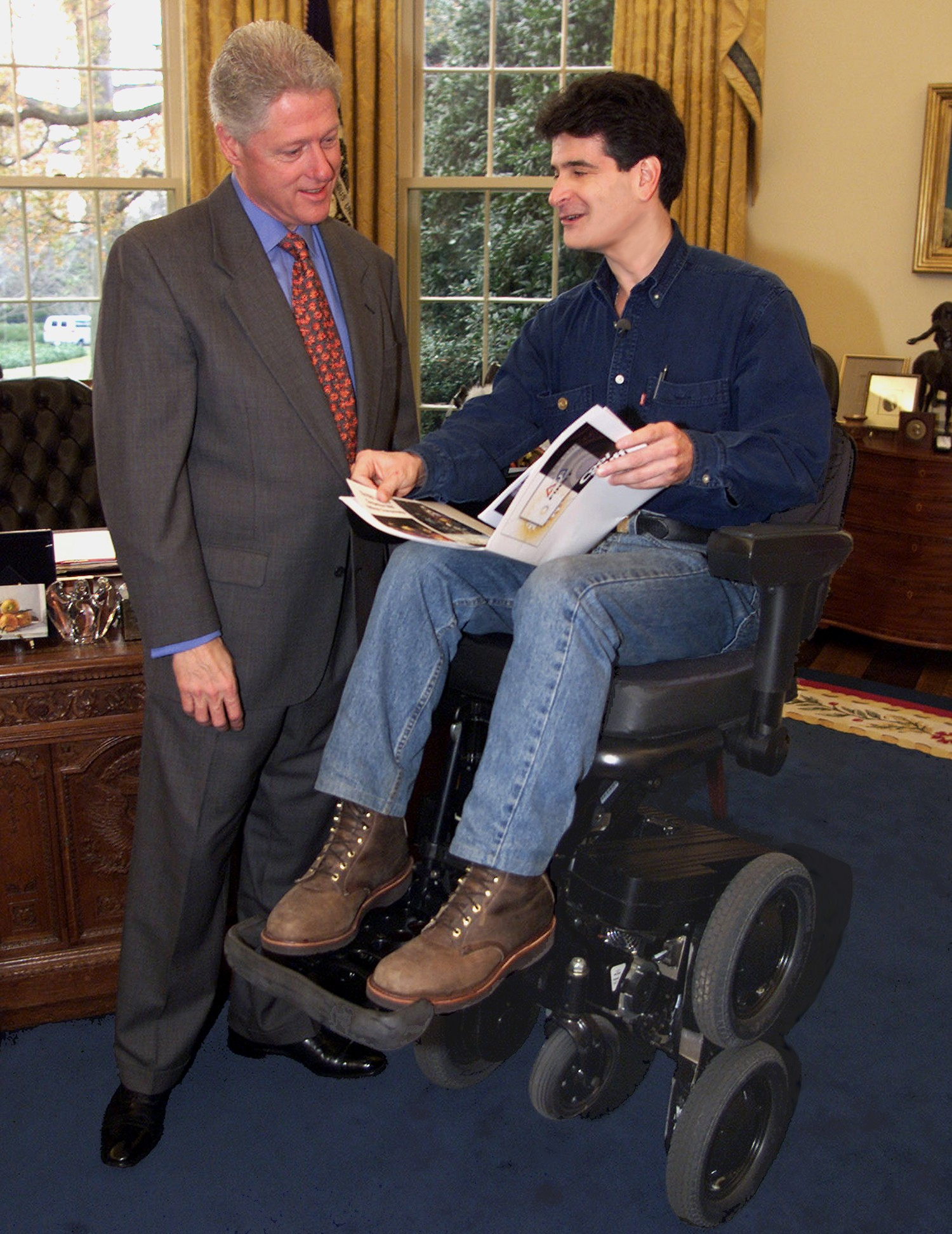
President Bill Clinton and Kamen in the White House, Kamen riding the iBOT Mobility System

=== Inventions ===
Kamen is known best for inventing the product that eventually became known as the Segway PT, an electric, self-balancing human transporter with a computer-controlled gyroscopic stabilization and control system. The device is balanced on two parallel wheels and is controlled by moving body weight. The machine's development was the object of much speculation and hype after segments of a book quoting Steve Jobs and other notable information technology visionaries espousing its society-revolutionizing potential were leaked in December 2001.

Kamen was already a successful inventor: his company Auto Syringe manufactures and markets the first drug infusion pump. His company DEKA also holds patents for the technology used in portable dialysis machines, an insulin pump (based on the drug infusion pump technology), and an all-terrain electric wheelchair known as the iBOT, using many of the same gyroscopic balancing technologies that later made their way into the Segway.

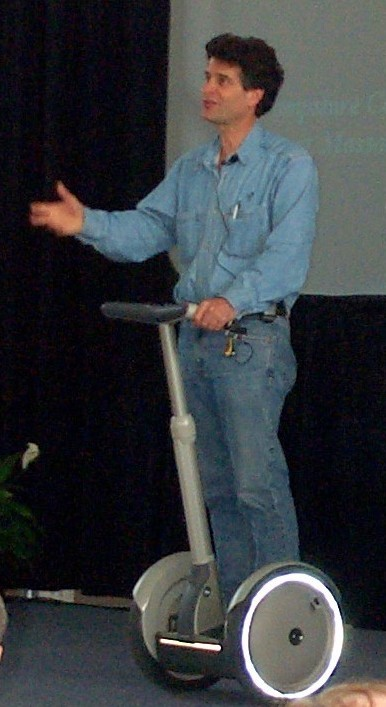
Kamen on one of his inventions, the Segway

Kamen Stirling Generator 10 coupled to Water Still 12 (from U.S. patent 7,340,879)

Kamen has worked extensively on a project involving Stirling engine designs, attempting to create two machines: one that would generate power, and the Slingshot that would serve as a water purification system. He hopes the project will help improve living standards in developing countries. Kamen has a patent on his water purifier, and other patents pending. In 2014, the film SlingShot was released, detailing Kamen's quest to use his vapor compression distiller to fix the world's water crisis.

Kamen is also the co-inventor of a compressed air device that would launch a human into the air in order to quickly launch SWAT teams or other emergency workers to the roofs of tall, inaccessible buildings.

In 2009, Kamen stated that his company DEKA was now working on solar powered inventions. Later, Kamen and DEKA developed the DEKA Arm System or "Luke", a prosthetic arm replacement that offers its user much more fine motor control than traditional prosthetic limbs. It was approved for use by the US Food and Drug Administration (FDA) in May 2014, and DEKA is looking for partners to mass-produce the prosthesis.

=== FIRST ===
In 1989, Kamen founded FIRST (For Inspiration and Recognition of Science and Technology), an organization intended to build students' interests in science, technology, engineering, and mathematics (STEM). In 1992, working with MIT Professor Emeritus Woodie Flowers, Kamen created the FIRST Robotics Competition (FRC), which evolved into an international competition that by 2020 had drawn 3,647 teams and more than 91,000 students.

FIRST organizes robotics competition leagues for students in grades K-12, including FIRST LEGO League Discover for ages 4–6, FIRST LEGO League Explore for younger elementary school students, FIRST LEGO League Challenge for older elementary school and middle school students, FIRST Tech Challenge (FTC) for middle and high school students, and FIRST Robotics Competition (FRC) for high school students. In 2010, Kamen called FIRST the invention he is most proud of, and said that 1 million students had taken part in the contests.

On January 31, 2026, Kamen was put on a leave of absence due to his ties with Jeffrey Epstein, and on March 11 he voluntarily resigned from the FIRST Board of Directors and withdrew from all FIRST activities.

=== Advanced Regenerative Manufacturing Institute ===
In 2017, Kamen founded the Advanced Regenerative Manufacturing Institute along with McCoy Mathies (ARMI) and launched BioFabUSA, a Manufacturing USA Innovation Institute with an $80 million grant from the Department of Defense. BioFabUSA's mission is to "...make practical the large-scale manufacturing of engineered tissues and tissue-related technologies, to benefit existing industries and grow new ones". In addition to DoD funding, Kamen brought together a consortium of private sector entities to form a public-private partnership which pledged $214M additional private dollars.

In early 2020, ARMI was awarded a grant from the Department of Health and Human Services to establish the first Foundry for American Biotechnology, known as NextFab "to produce technological solutions that help the United States protect against and respond to health security threats, enhance daily medical care, and add to the U.S. bioeconomy".

=== Awards ===
Kamen has won numerous awards. He was elected to the National Academy of Engineering in 1997 for inventing and commercializing biomedical devices and fluid measurement and control systems, and for popularizing engineering among young people. In 1999 he was awarded the 5th Annual Heinz Award in Technology, the Economy and Employment, and in 2000 received the National Medal of Technology from then President Clinton for inventions that have advanced medical care worldwide. In April 2002, Kamen was awarded the Lemelson-MIT Prize for inventors, for his invention of the Segway and of an infusion pump for diabetics. In 2003 his "Project Slingshot", an inexpensive portable water purification system, was named a runner-up for "coolest invention of 2003" by Time magazine.

In 2005 he was inducted into the National Inventors Hall of Fame for his invention of the AutoSyringe. In 2006 Kamen was awarded the "Global Humanitarian Action Award" by the United Nations. In 2007 he received the ASME Medal, the highest award from the American Society of Mechanical Engineers, in 2008 he was the recipient of the IRI Achievement Award from the Industrial Research Institute, and in 2011 Kamen was awarded the Benjamin Franklin Medal in Mechanical Engineering of the Franklin Institute.

Kamen received an honorary Doctor of Engineering degree from Worcester Polytechnic Institute in 1992, Rensselaer Polytechnic Institute May 17, 1996, a Doctor of Engineering degree from Kettering University in 2001, an honorary Doctor of Science degree from Clarkson University on May 13, 2001, an honorary "Doctor of Science" degree from the University of Arizona on May 16, 2009, and an honorary doctorate from the Wentworth Institute of Technology when he spoke at the college's centennial celebration in 2004, and other honorary doctorates from North Carolina State University in 2005, Bates College in 2007, the Georgia Institute of Technology in 2008, the Illinois Institute of Technology in 2008 the Plymouth State University in May 2008 and Rose-Hulman Institute of Technology in 2012. In 2015, Kamen received an honorary Doctor of Engineering and Technology degree from Yale University. In 2017, Kamen was honored with an institutional honorary degree from Université de Sherbrooke.

Kamen received the Stevens Honor Award on November 6, 2009, given by the Stevens Institute of Technology and the Stevens Alumni Association. On November 14, 2013, he received the James C. Morgan Global Humanitarian Award. Kamen received the 2018 Public Service Award from the National Science Board, honoring his exemplary public service and contributions to the public's understanding of science and engineering.

== Personal life ==
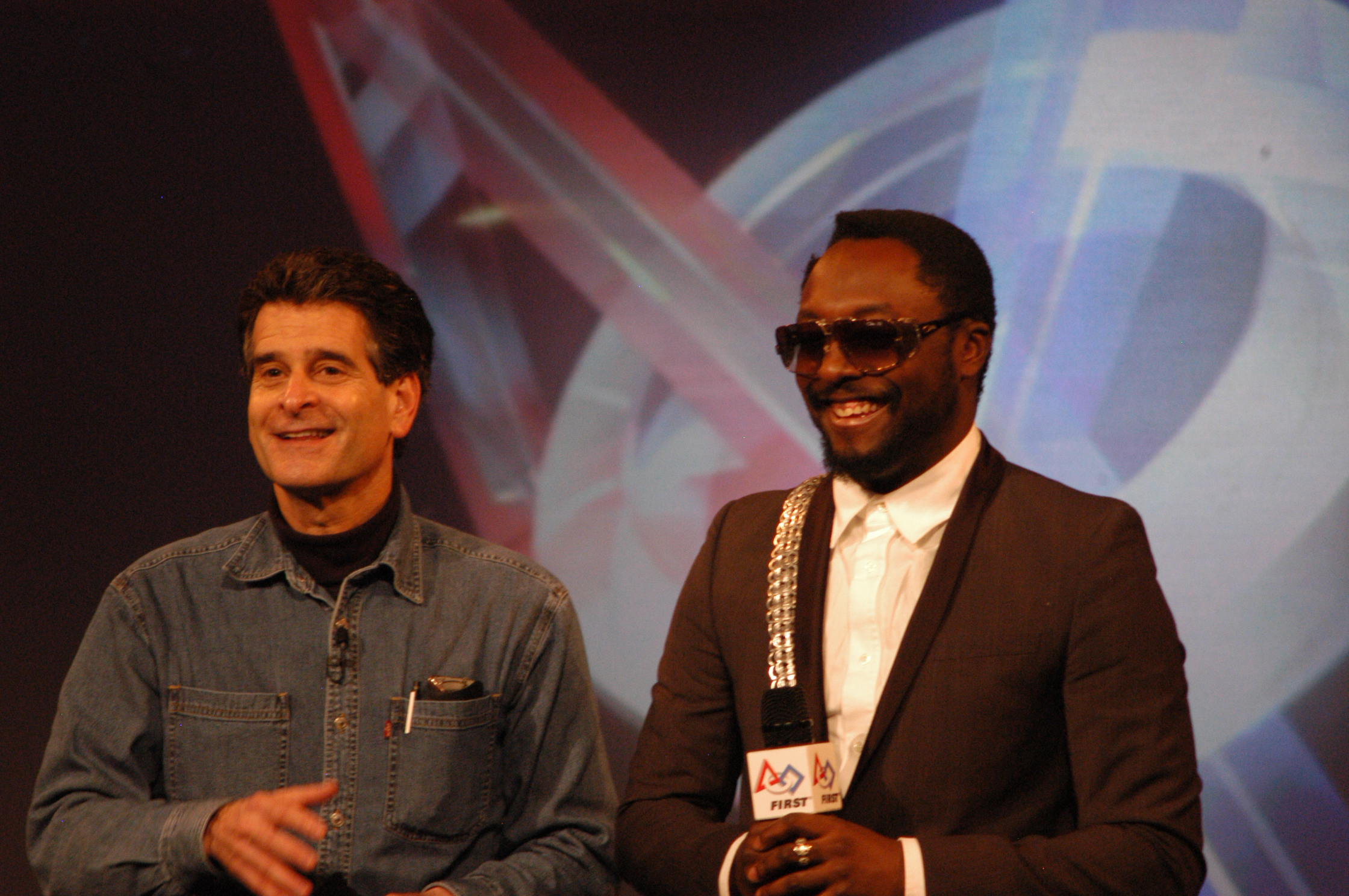
Will.i.am speaking at the 2011 FIRST kickoff at Southern New Hampshire University with Kamen

In 2007, his residence was a hexagonal, shed style mansion he dubbed Westwind, located in Bedford, New Hampshire, just outside Manchester. Kamen owns and pilots an Embraer Phenom 300 light jet aircraft and three Enstrom helicopters, including a 280FX, a 480, and a 480B. He regularly commutes to work via his helicopters and had a hangar built into his house. In 2016 he flew as a passenger in a B-2 Spirit bomber at Whiteman AFB, marking the opening of the 2016 FRC World Championship in St. Louis.

He is the main subject of Code Name Ginger: the Story Behind Segway and Dean Kamen's Quest to Invent a New World, a nonfiction narrative book by journalist Steve Kemper published by Harvard Business School Press in 2003 (released in paperback as Reinventing the Wheel). Kamen is a member of the USA Science and Engineering Festival's Advisory Board and is also a member of the Xconomists, an ad hoc team of editorial advisors for the tech news and media company, Xconomy. He is also on the Board of Trustees of the X Prize Foundation. Dean of Invention, a TV show on Planet Green, premiered on October 22, 2010. It starred Kamen and correspondent Joanne Colan, in which they investigate new technologies. In the 2016 United States Senate election in New Hampshire, Kamen endorsed Kelly Ayotte, appearing in an ad supporting her.

=== Relationship with Jeffrey Epstein ===
Kamen appeared in photographs from the estate of Jeffrey Epstein that were released to the public in December 2025, where he was shown with Epstein and Richard Branson on what appears to be a beach. Kamen stated that the pictures were probably from Branson's Necker Island, and claimed to have no connection with Epstein. His name had earlier appeared in the 2003 flight logs of Epstein's private jet. Further documents released in January 2026 included references to Kamen visiting Epstein's island and records of multiple phone calls and meetings between the two men. Kamen employed Nadia Marcinko as a flight trainer at DEKA.

In January 2026, Kamen voluntarily took a leave of absence from FIRST following the Department of Justice's release of files detailing past communications with Jeffrey Epstein. Although an independent review by an outside law firm found no evidence of legal misconduct, Kamen voluntarily resigned from the FIRST board of directors and withdrew from all organization activities in March 2026 to avoid creating further distractions. Following his departure, FIRST officially renamed the "Dean's List Award" to the "FIRST Leadership Award" ahead of the 2026 championship events.

== See also ==
- Insulin pump
- North Dumpling Island
- SlingShot
