= Dichloramine-T =

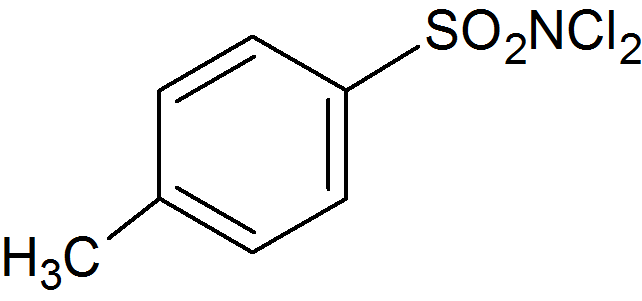

Names
- Preferred IUPAC name N,N-Dichloro-4-methylbenzene-1-sulfonamide

Identifiers
CAS Number	473-34-7
3D model (JSmol)	Interactive image
ChEMBL	ChEMBL2104599
ChemSpider	61371
ECHA InfoCard	100.006.786
EC Number	207-462-4
PubChem CID	68056
UNII	36XJA7756O
CompTox Dashboard (EPA)	DTXSID6060054
- InChI: InChI=1S/C7H7Cl2NO2S/c1-6-2-4-7(5-3-6)13(11,12)10(8)9/h2-5H,1H3 Key: ARGDYOIRHYLIMT-UHFFFAOYSA-N
- SMILES: CC1=CC=C(C=C1)S(=O)(=O)N(Cl)Cl

Properties
Chemical formula	C_{7}H_{7}Cl_{2}NO_{2}S
Molar mass	240.10 g·mol^{−1}

Hazards
- GHS labelling
Pictograms	(GHS03: Oxidizing) (GHS07: Exclamation mark)
Signal word	Danger
Hazard statements	H271, H315, H319, H335
Precautionary statements	P210, P220, P221, P261, P264, P271, P280, P283, P302+P352, P304+P340, P305+P351+P338, P306+P360, P312, P321, P332+P313, P337+P313, P362, P370+P378, P371+P380+P375, P403+P233, P405, P501
- Except where otherwise noted, data are given for materials in their standard state (at 25 °C [77 °F], 100 kPa). Infobox references

Dichloramine-T or N,N-Dichloro-p-toluenesulfonamide is a chemical used as a disinfectant starting at the beginning of the 20th century. The chemical contains toluene substituted by a sulfonamide grouping, which in turn has two chlorine atoms attached to the nitrogen.

== Production ==
Dichloramine-T was first made by Frederick Daniel Chattaway in 1905. Dichloramine-T can be made from para-toluenesulfonamide and bleaching powder, or chlorine.

== Properties ==
Dichloramine-T degrades with exposure to light or air.
