= Portable water purification =

Self-contained, easily transported units used to purify water from untreated sources

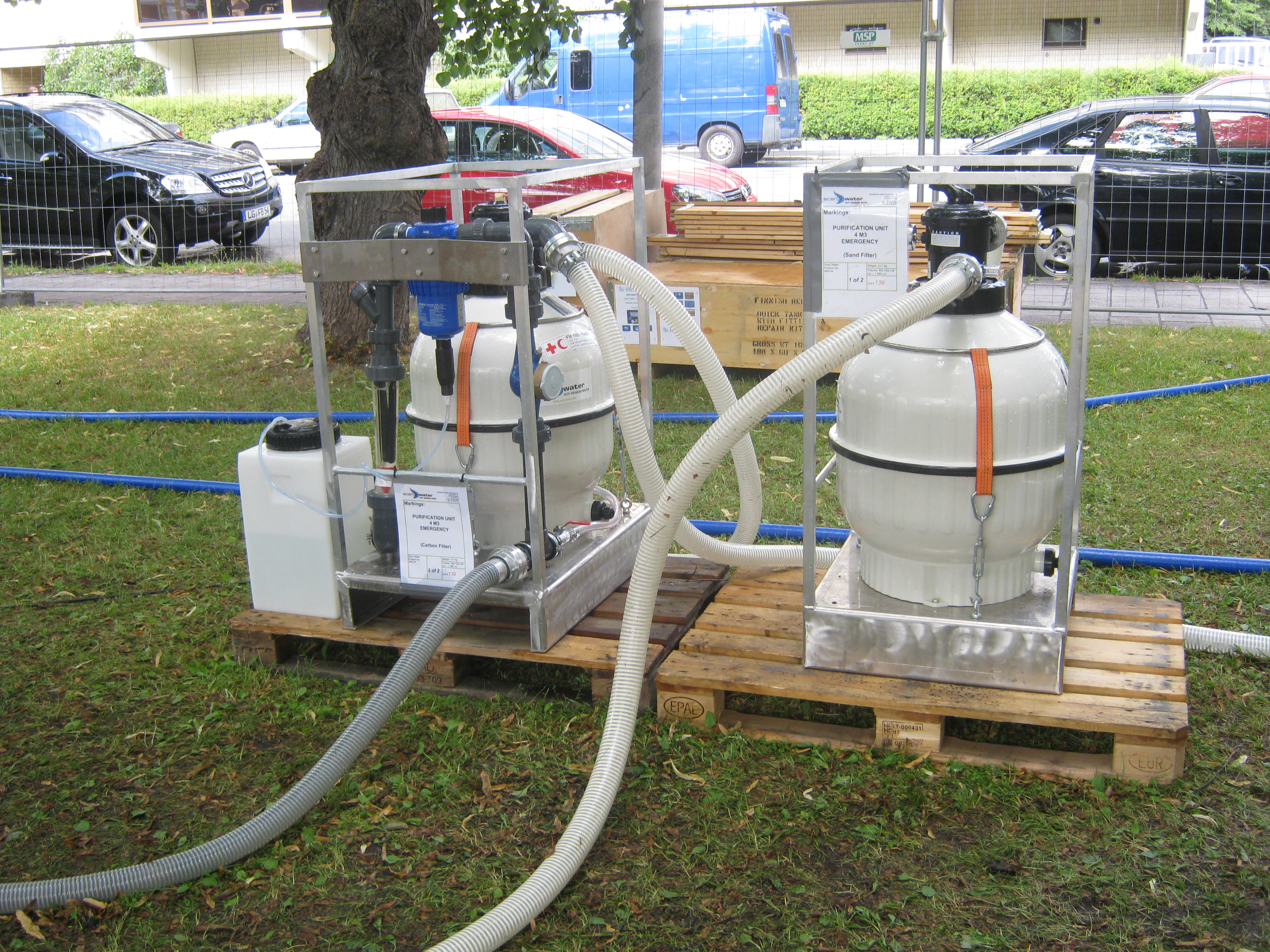
Portable water purification unit used by International Red Cross and Red Crescent.

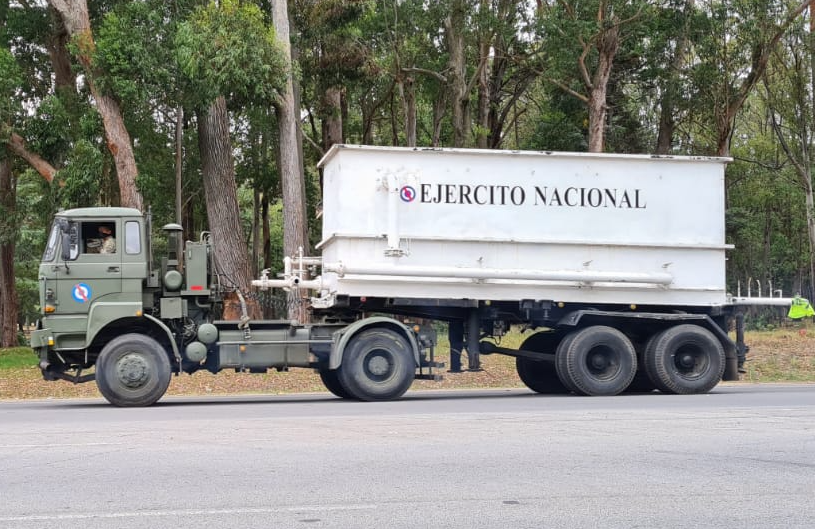
Water Potabilization Unit (UPA) designed and used by the Uruguayan National Army and the Uruguayan water supply company OSE.

Portable water purification devices are self-contained, easily transported units used to purify water from untreated sources (such as rivers, lakes, and wells) for drinking purposes. Their main function is to eliminate pathogens, and often also suspended solids and some unpalatable or toxic compounds.

These units provide an autonomous supply of drinking water to people without access to clean water supply services, including inhabitants of developing countries and disaster areas, military personnel, campers, hikers, and workers in wilderness, and survivalists. They are also called point-of-use water treatment systems and field water disinfection techniques.

Techniques include heat (including boiling), filtration, activated charcoal adsorption, chemical disinfection (e.g. chlorination, iodine, ozonation, etc.), ultraviolet purification (including sodis), distillation (including solar distillation), and flocculation. Often these are used in combination.

== Drinking water hazards ==
Untreated water may contain potentially pathogenic agents, including protozoa, bacteria, viruses, and some larvae of higher-order parasites such as liver flukes and roundworms. Chemical pollutants such as pesticides, heavy metals and synthetic organics may be present. Other components may affect taste, odour and general aesthetic qualities, including turbidity from soil or clay, colour from humic acid or microscopic algae, odours from certain type of bacteria, particularly Actinomycetes which produce geosmin, and saltiness from brackish or sea water.

Common metallic contaminants such as copper and lead can be treated by increasing the pH using soda ash or lime, which precipitates such metals. Careful decanting of the clear water after settlement or the use of filtration provides acceptably low levels of metals. Water contaminated by aluminium or zinc cannot be treated in this way using a strong alkali as higher pHs re-dissolve the metal salts. Salt is difficult to remove except by reverse osmosis or distillation.

Most portable treatment processes focus on mitigating human pathogens for safety and removing particulates matter, tastes and odours. Significant pathogens commonly present in the developed world include Giardia, Cryptosporidium, Shigella, hepatitis A virus, Escherichia coli, and enterovirus. In less developed countries there may be risks from cholera and dysentery organisms and a range of tropical enteroparasites.

Giardia lamblia and Cryptosporidium spp., both of which cause diarrhea (see giardiasis and cryptosporidiosis) are common pathogens. In backcountry areas of the United States and Canada they are sometimes present in sufficient quantity that water treatment is justified for backpackers, although this has created some controversy. (See wilderness acquired diarrhea.) In Hawaii and other tropical areas, Leptospira spp. are another possible problem.

Less commonly seen in developed countries are organisms such as Vibrio cholerae which causes cholera and various strains of Salmonella which cause typhoid and para-typhoid diseases. Pathogenic viruses may also be found in water. The larvae of flukes are particularly dangerous in area frequented by sheep, deer, or cattle. If such microscopic larvae are ingested, they can form potentially life-threatening cysts in the brain or liver. This risk extends to plants grown in or near water including the commonly eaten watercress.

In general, more human activity up stream (i.e. the larger the stream/river) the greater the potential for contamination from sewage effluent, surface runoff, or industrial pollutants. Groundwater pollution may occur from human activity (e.g. on-site sanitation systems or mining) or might be naturally occurring (e.g. from arsenic in some regions of India and Bangladesh). Water collected as far upstream as possible above all known or anticipated risks of pollution poses the lowest risk of contamination and is best suited to portable treatment methods.

== Techniques ==
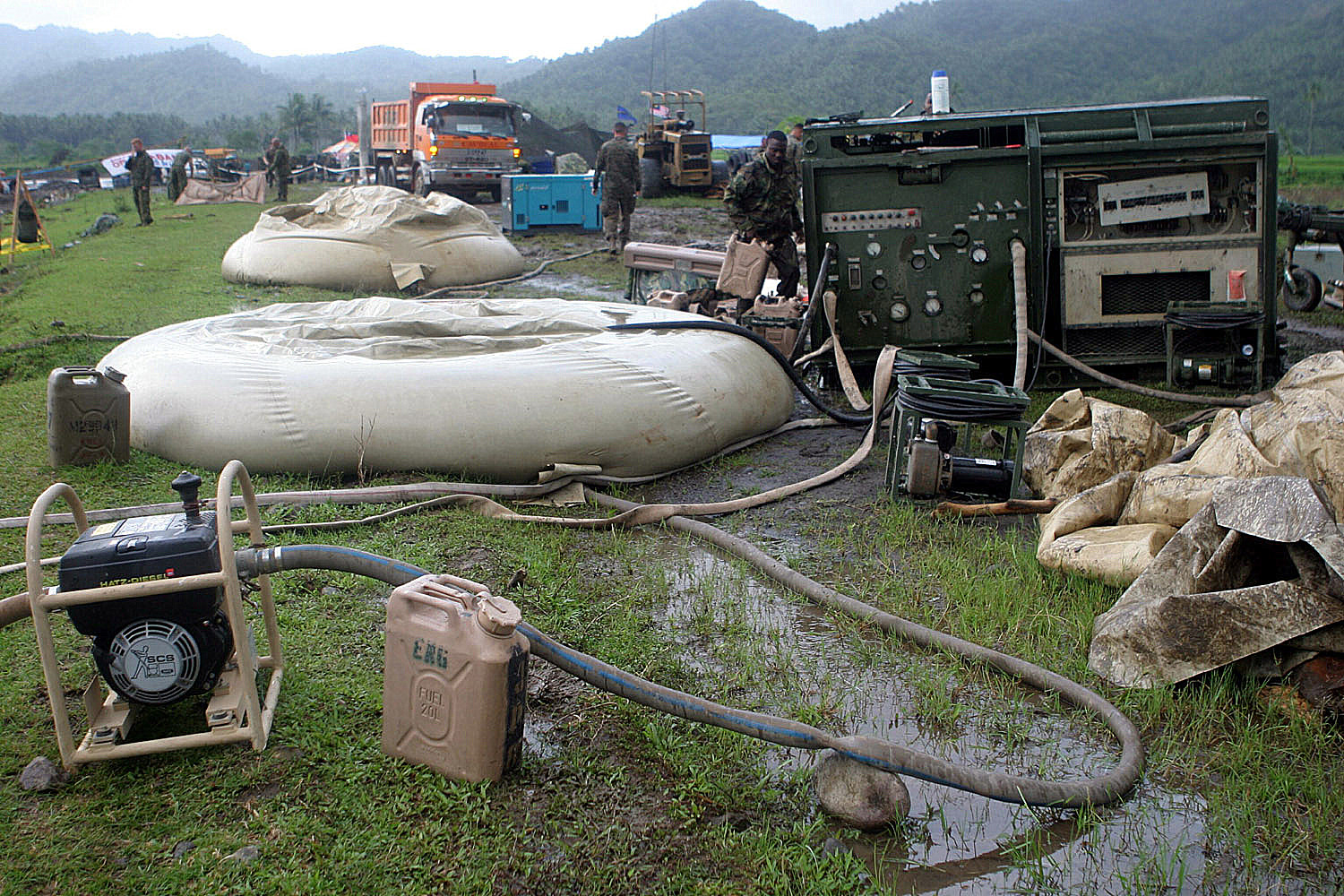
31st Marine Expeditionary Unit (MEU) Service Support Group 31 in Leyte, Philippines (Feb. 20, 2006)

Not all techniques by themselves will mitigate all hazards. Although flocculation followed by filtration has been suggested as best practice this is rarely practicable without the ability to carefully control pH and settling conditions. Ill-advised use of alum as a flocculant can lead to unacceptable levels of aluminium in the water so treated. If water is to be stored, halogens offer extended protection.

=== Heat (boiling) ===
Heat kills disease-causing micro-organisms, with higher temperatures and/or duration required for some pathogens. Sterilization of water (killing all living contaminants) is not necessary to make water safe to drink; one only needs to render enteric (intestinal) pathogens harmless. Boiling does not remove most pollutants and does not leave any residual protection.

The World Health Organization (WHO) states bringing water to rolling boil then naturally cooling is sufficient to inactivate pathogenic bacteria, viruses and protozoa.

The Centers for Disease Control and Prevention (CDC) recommends a rolling boil for 1 minute. At high elevations, though, the boiling point of water drops. At altitudes greater than 6,562 feet (2,000 meters) boiling should continue for 3 minutes.

All bacterial pathogens are quickly killed above 60 °C (140 °F), therefore, although boiling is not necessary to make the water safe to drink, the time taken to heat the water to boiling is usually sufficient to reduce bacterial concentrations to safe levels. Encysted protozoan pathogens may require higher temperatures to remove any risk.

Boiling is not always necessary nor sometimes enough. Pasteurization where enough pathogens are killed typically occurs at 63 °C for 30 minutes or 72 °C for 15 seconds. Certain pathogens must be heated above boiling (e.g. botulism – Clostridium botulinum requires 118 °C (244 °F), most endospores require 120 °C (248 °F), and prions even higher). Higher temperatures may be achieved with a pressure cooker. Heat combined with ultraviolet light (UV), such as sodis method, reduces the necessary temperature and duration.

=== Filtration ===
Portable pump filters are commercially available with ceramic filters that filter 5,000 to 50,000 litres per cartridge, removing pathogens down to the 0.2–0.3 micrometer (μm) range. Some also utilize activated charcoal filtering. Most filters of this kind remove most bacteria and protozoa, such as Cryptosporidium and Giardia lamblia, but not viruses except for the very largest of 0.3 μm and larger diameters, so disinfection by chemicals or ultraviolet light is still required after filtration. It is worth noting that not all bacteria are removed by 0.2 μm pump filters; for example, strands of thread-like Leptospira spp. (which can cause leptospirosis) are thin enough to pass through a 0.2 μm filter. Effective chemical additives to address shortcomings in pump filters include chlorine, chlorine dioxide, iodine, and sodium hypochlorite (bleach). There have been polymer and ceramic filters on the market that incorporated iodine post-treatment in their filter elements to kill viruses and the smaller bacteria that cannot be filtered out, but most have disappeared due to the unpleasant taste imparted to the water, as well as possible adverse health effects when iodine is ingested over protracted periods.

While the filtration elements may do an excellent job of removing most bacteria and fungi contaminants from drinking water when new, the elements themselves can become colonization sites. In recent years some filters have been enhanced by bonding silver metal nanoparticles to the ceramic element and/or to the activated charcoal to suppress growth of pathogens.

Small, hand-pumped reverse osmosis filters were originally developed for the military in the late 1980s for use as survival equipment, for example, to be included with inflatable rafts on aircraft. Civilian versions are available. Instead of using the static pressure of a water supply line to force the water through the filter, pressure is provided by a hand-operated pump. These devices can generate drinkable water from seawater.

The Portable Aqua Unit for Lifesaving ("PAUL") is a portable ultrafiltration-based membrane water filter for humanitarian aid. It allows the decentralized supply of clean water in emergency and disaster situations for about 400 persons per unit per day. The filter is designed to function with neither chemicals nor energy nor trained personnel.

=== Activated charcoal adsorption ===
Granular activated carbon filtering utilizes a form of activated carbon with a high surface area, and adsorbs many compounds, including many toxic compounds. Water passing through activated carbon is commonly used in concert with hand pumped filters to address organic contamination, taste, or objectionable odors. Activated carbon filters are not usually used as the primary purification techniques of portable water purification devices, but rather as secondary means to complement another purification technique. It is most commonly implemented for pre- or post-filtering, in a separate step than ceramic filtering, in either case being implemented prior to the addition of chemical disinfectants used to control bacteria or viruses that filters cannot remove. Activated charcoal can remove chlorine from treated water, removing any residual protection remaining in the water protecting against pathogens, and should not, in general, be used without careful thought after chemical disinfection treatments in portable water purification processing. Ceramic/Carbon Core filters with a 0.5 μm or smaller pore size are excellent for removing bacteria and cysts while also removing chemicals.

=== Chemical disinfection with halogens ===
Chemical disinfection with halogens, chiefly chlorine and iodine, results from oxidation of essential cellular structures and enzymes. The primary factors that determine the rate and proportion of microorganisms killed are the residual or available halogen concentration and the exposure time. Secondary factors are pathogen species, water temperature, pH, and organic contaminants. In field-water disinfection, use of concentrations of 1–16 mg/L for 10–60 min is generally effective. Of note, Cryptosporidium oocysts, likely Cyclospora species, Ascaris eggs are extremely resistant to halogens and field inactivation may not be practical with bleach and iodine.

==== Iodine ====
Iodine used for water purification is commonly added to water as a solution, in crystallized form, or in tablets containing tetraglycine hydroperiodide that release 8 mg of iodine per tablet. The iodine kills many, but not all, of the most common pathogens present in natural fresh water sources. Carrying iodine for water purification is an imperfect but lightweight solution for those in need of field purification of drinking water. Kits are available in camping stores that include an iodine pill and a second pill (vitamin C or ascorbic acid) that will remove the iodine taste from the water after it has been disinfected. The addition of vitamin C, in the form of a pill or in flavored drink powders, precipitates much of the iodine out of the solution, so it should not be added until the iodine has had sufficient time to work. This time is 30 minutes in relatively clear, warm water, but is considerably longer if the water is turbid or cold. If the iodine has precipitated out of the solution, then the drinking water has less available iodine in the solution. Tetraglycine hydroperiodide maintains its effectiveness indefinitely before the container is opened; although some manufacturers suggest not using the tablets more than three months after the container has initially been opened, the shelf life is in fact very long provided that the container is resealed immediately after each time it is opened.

Similarly to potassium iodide (KI), sufficient consumption of tetraglycine hydroperiodide tablets may protect the thyroid against uptake of radioactive iodine. A 1995 study found that daily consumption of water treated with 4 tablets containing tetraglycine hydroperiodide reduced the uptake of radioactive iodine in human subjects to a mean of 1.1 percent, from a baseline mean of 16 percent, after a week of treatment. At 90 days of daily treatment, uptake was further reduced to a mean of 0.5 percent. However, unlike KI, tetraglycine hydroperiodide is not recommended by the WHO for this purpose.

Iodine should be allowed at least 30 minutes to kill Giardia.

==== Iodine crystals ====
A potentially lower cost alternative to using iodine-based water purification tablets is the use of iodine crystals, although there are serious risks of acute iodine toxicity if preparation and dilution are not measured with some accuracy. This method may not be adequate in killing Giardia cysts in cold water. An advantage of using iodine crystals is that only a small amount of iodine is dissolved from the iodine crystals at each use, giving this method of treating water a capability for treating very large volumes of water. Unlike tetraglycine hydroperiodide tablets, iodine crystals have an unlimited shelf life as long as they are not exposed to air for long periods of time or are kept under water. Iodine crystals will sublimate if exposed to air for long periods of time. The large quantity of water that can be purified with iodine crystals at low cost makes this technique especially cost effective for point of use or emergency water purification methods intended for use longer than the shelf life of tetraglycine hydroperiodide.

==== Halazone tablets ====
Chlorine-based halazone tablets were formerly popularly used for portable water purification. Chlorine in water is more than three times more effective as a disinfectant against Escherichia coli than iodine. Halazone tablets were thus commonly used during World War II by U.S. soldiers for portable water purification, even being included in accessory packs for C-rations until 1945.

Sodium dichloroisocyanurate (NaDCC) has largely displaced halazone tablets for the few remaining chlorine-based water purification tablets available today.

==== Bleach ====
Household bleach including calcium hypochlorite (Ca[OCl]_{2}) and sodium hypochlorite (NaOCl) are low-cost oxidizers.

Chlorine bleach tablets give a more stable platform for disinfecting the water than liquid bleach as the liquid version tends to degrade with age and give unregulated results unless assays are carried out, which may be impractical in the field. Still, liquid bleach may nonetheless safely be used for short-term emergency water disinfection.

The United States Environmental Protection Agency (EPA) recommends two drops of 8.25% sodium hypochlorite solution (regular, unscented chlorine bleach) mixed per one quart/liter of water and leave to stand covered for 30 to 60 minutes. Two drops of 5% solution also suffices. Double the amount of bleach if the water is cloudy, colored, or very cold. Afterwards, the water should have a slight chlorine odor. If not repeat the dosage and let stand for another 15 minutes before use. After this treatment, the water may be left open to reduce the chlorine smell and taste.

The CDC and Population Services International (PSI) promote a similar product (a 0.5% - 1.5% sodium hypochlorite solution) as part of their Safe Water System (SWS) strategy. The product is sold in developing countries under local brand names specifically for the purpose of disinfecting drinking water.

Neither chlorine (e.g., bleach) nor iodine alone is considered completely effective against Cryptosporidium, although they are partially effective against Giardia. Chlorine is considered slightly better against the latter. A more complete field solution that includes chemical disinfectants is to first filter the water, using a 0.2 μm ceramic cartridge pumped filter, followed by treatment with iodine or chlorine, thereby filtering out cryptosporidium, Giardia, and most bacteria, along with the larger viruses, while also using chemical disinfectant to address smaller viruses and bacteria that the filter cannot remove. This combination is also potentially more effective in some cases than even using portable electronic disinfection based on UV treatment.

==== Chlorine dioxide ====
Chlorine dioxide can come from tablets or be created by mixing two chemicals together. It is more effective than iodine or chlorine against giardia, and although it has only low to moderate effectiveness against cryptosporidium, iodine and chlorine are ineffective against this protozoan. The cost of chlorine dioxide treatment is higher than the cost of iodine treatment.

==== Mixed oxidant ====
A simple brine {salt + water} solution in an electrolytic reaction produces a powerful mixed oxidant disinfectant (mostly chlorine in the form of hypochlorous acid (HOCl) and some peroxide, ozone, chlorine dioxide).

==== Chlorine tablets ====
Sodium dichloroisocyanurate or troclosene sodium, more commonly shortened as NaDCC, is a form of chlorine used for disinfection. It is used by major non-governmental organizations such as UNICEF to treat water in emergencies.

Sodium dichloroisocyanurate tablets are available in a range of concentrations to treat differing volumes of water to give the World Health Organization's recommended 5ppm available chlorine. They are effervescent tablets allowing the tablet to dissolve in a matter of minutes.

=== Other chemical disinfection additives ===
==== Silver ion tablets ====
An alternative to iodine-based preparations in some usage scenarios are silver ion/chlorine dioxide-based tablets or droplets. These solutions may disinfect water more effectively than iodine-based techniques while leaving hardly any noticeable taste in the water in some usage scenarios. Silver ion/chlorine dioxide-based disinfecting agents will kill Cryptosporidium and Giardia, if utilized correctly. The primary disadvantage of silver ion/chlorine dioxide-based techniques is the long purification times (generally 30 minutes to 4 hours, depending on the formulation used). Another concern is the possible deposition and accumulation of silver compounds in various body tissues leading to a rare condition called argyria that results in a permanent, disfiguring, bluish-gray pigmentation of the skin, eyes, and mucous membranes.

==== Hydrogen peroxide ====
One recent study has found that the wild Salmonella which would reproduce quickly during subsequent dark storage of solar-disinfected water could be controlled by the addition of just 10 parts per million of hydrogen peroxide.

=== Ultraviolet purification ===
Ultraviolet (UV) light induces the formation of covalent linkages on DNA and thereby prevents microbes from reproducing. Without reproduction, the microbes become far less dangerous. Germicidal UV-C light in the short wavelength range of 100–280 nm acts on thymine, one of the four base nucleotides in DNA. When a germicidal UV photon is absorbed by a thymine molecule that is adjacent to another thymine within the DNA strand, a covalent bond or dimer between the molecules is created. This thymine dimer prevents enzymes from "reading" the DNA and copying it, thus neutering the microbe. Prolonged exposure to ionizing radiation can cause single and double-stranded breaks in DNA, oxidation of membrane lipids, and denaturation of proteins, all of which are toxic to cells. Still, there are limits to this technology. Water turbidity (i.e., the amount of suspended & colloidal solids contained in the water to be treated) must be low, such that the water is clear, for UV purification to work well - thus a pre-filter step might be necessary.

A concern with UV portable water purification is that some pathogens are hundreds of times less sensitive to UV light than others. Protozoan cysts were once believed to be among the least sensitive, however recent studies have proved otherwise, demonstrating that both Cryptosporidium and Giardia are deactivated by a UV dose of just 6 mJ/cm^{2} However, EPA regulations and other studies show that it is viruses that are the limiting factor of UV treatment, requiring a 10-30 times greater dose of UV light than Giardia or Cryptosporidium. Studies have shown that UV doses at the levels provided by common portable UV units are effective at killing Giardia and that there was no evidence of repair and reactivation of the cysts.

Water treated with UV still has the microbes present in the water, only with their means for reproduction turned "off". In the event that such UV-treated water containing neutered microbes is exposed to visible light (specifically, wavelengths of light over 330-500 nm) for any significant period of time, a process known as photo reactivation can take place, where the possibility for repairing the damage in the bacteria's reproduction DNA arises, potentially rendering them once more capable of reproducing and causing disease. UV-treated water must therefore not be exposed to visible light for any significant period of time after UV treatment, before consumption, to avoid ingesting reactivated and dangerous microbes.

Recent developments in semiconductor technology allows for the development of UV-C Light Emitting Diodes (LEDs). UV-C LED systems address disadvantages of mercury-based technology, namely: power-cycling penalties, high power needs, fragility, warm-up time, and mercury content.

=== Solar water disinfection ===
In solar water disinfection (often shortened as "sodis"), microbes are destroyed by temperature and UVA radiation provided by the sun. Water is placed in a transparent plastic PET bottle or plastic bag, oxygenated by shaking partially filled capped bottles prior to filling the bottles all the way, and left in the sun for 6–24 hours atop a reflective surface.

=== Solar distillation ===
Solar distillation relies on sunlight to warm and evaporate the water to be purified which then condenses and trickles into a container. In theory, a solar (condensation) still removes all pathogens, salts, metals, and most chemicals but in field practice the lack of clean components, easy contact with dirt, improvised construction, and disturbances result in cleaner, yet contaminated water.

=== Homemade water filters ===
Water filters can be made on-site using local materials such as sand and charcoal (e.g. from firewood burned in a special way). These filters are sometimes used by soldiers and outdoor enthusiasts. Due to their low cost they can be made and used by anyone. The reliability of such systems is highly variable. Such filters can do little, if anything, to mitigate germs and other harmful constituents and can give a false sense of security that the water so produced is potable. Water processed through an improvised filter should undergo secondary processing such as boiling to render it safe for consumption.

== Prevention of water contamination ==
Human water-borne diseases usually come from other humans, thus human-derived materials (feces, medical waste, wash water, lawn chemicals, gasoline engines, garbage, etc.) should be kept far away from water sources. For example, human excreta should be buried well away (>60 meters/200 feet) from water sources to reduce contamination. In some wilderness areas it is recommended that all waste be packed up and carted out to a properly designated disposal point.

== See also ==
- Ceramic water filter
- Desalination
- Self-supply of water and sanitation
- Solar water disinfection
- Traveler's diarrhea
- Water quality
- Wilderness acquired diarrhea
