= Păulești =

Păuleşti may refer to:

- Păulești, Prahova, a commune in Prahova County, Romania
- Păulești, Satu Mare, a commune in Satu Mare County, Romania
- Păulești, Vrancea, a commune Vrancea County, Romania
- Păuleşti, a village in Brusturi Commune, Bihor County, Romania
- Păuleşti, a village in Bulzeștii de Sus Commune, Hunedoara County, Romania
- Păuleşti, Călăraşi, a commune in Călăraşi district, Moldova

== See also ==
- Păuleni (disambiguation)
- Păuleasca (disambiguation)
