= Păuleni =

Păuleni may refer to several places in Romania:

- Păuleni, a village in Șuici Commune, Argeș County
- Păuleni, a village in Lupeni Commune, Harghita County
- Păuleni-Ciuc, a commune in Harghita County, Romania

== See also ==
- Păulești (disambiguation)
- Păuleasca (disambiguation)
