= Păuleasca =

Păuleasca may refer to the following places in Romania:

- Păuleasca, a village in Mălureni Commune, Argeș County
- Păuleasca, a village in Micești Commune, Argeș County
- Păuleasca, a village in Frumoasa Commune, Teleorman County
- Păuleasca, a tributary of the Miniș in Caraș-Severin County
- Păuleasca, another name for the river Micești in Argeș County

== See also ==
- Păuleni (disambiguation)
- Păulești (disambiguation)
