= Tata Swach =

Water purifier

- Type: Subsidiary
- Industry: Retail
- Products: Water Filter Products
- Parent: Tata Chemicals
- Website: www.tataswach.com

The Tata Swach is a water purifier developed by Tata Chemicals, a part of the Tata group in India. Swach was designed as a low-cost purifier for Indian low-income groups, who lack access to safe drinking water. The product is sold in three variants as Tata Swach, Tata Swach Smart and Tata Swach Smart Magic.

== Product development ==
Tata Swach was designed by Tata Research, Development and Design Centre (TRDDC) and Tata Chemicals with contributions from other Tata group companies. In 2004 the company developed a water purifier called Sujal. Tata Consultancy Services deployed thousands of these filters in the Indian Ocean tsunami disaster of 2004 as part of its relief activities.

Sujal was a very basic low-cost model which used rice-husk ash (produced from heating rice husk in combination with pebbles and cement). Activated silica and carbon is present in the ash; silica can reduce the turbidity of water, while activated carbon binds with and absorbs non-polar impurities (such as pesticides and fertilisers). However, the purification system did not have bacteriostatic or bactericidal properties, and it was incapable of removing impurities such as lithium, alcohols, ammonia, strong acids and bases or inorganic substances like sodium, lead, iron, arsenic and nitrates. Dr. Muraly Sastry, Chief Scientific Officer of Tata Chemicals, confirmed that even though Sujal could successfully remove the odour, colour and particulate matter from impure water, many pathogens could not be eliminated.

To address these concerns, the Swach product was conceptualised by Tata Consultancy Services and produced by Tata Chemicals. Titan Industries contributed to the development of special assembly presses for mass production of the units.

=== Nanotech purification technology ===
In the Tata Swach design, water purification is carried out using processed rice husk ash impregnated with nano (1 x 10^{-9}) silver particles for purifying the water and to destroy disease causing bacteria, germs and other organisms. The bacteriostatic and bactericidal properties of silver are attributed to its ability to react with the sulphhydryl (-SH) groups in the bacterial cells that produces the structural changes in bacterial cell membranes and interacts with nucleic acids. The nano sized particles help in increasing the surface area so that the bacteria get enough reaction time.

The Swach can purify water at the rate of about 3 to 4 litres (0.79 to 1.06 US gal; 0.66 to 0.88 imp gal) every hour. The purifier consists of two parts; an upper reservoir where the untreated water enters and a lower middle portion with a bulb to which the cartridge can be attached. Another reservoir is placed at the lower end, which collects purified water. The two chambers are stackable and arranged so that the entire system can function on gravity. The Tata Swach Smart is a variant with a more compact design, holding 15 litres (4.0 US gal; 3.3 imp gal).

=== Tata Swach Bulb ===
Tata Swach Bulb is the main purifying unit of the product. The Swach Bulb, depending on the quality of water, can purify about 3,000 litres (790 US gal; 660 imp gal) of water, after which the bulb must be replaced. The bulb has a "fuse" indicating when a cartridge change is required.

== See also ==
- Nanotechnology in water treatment
