= Ethyl iodoacetate =

- Skeletal formula

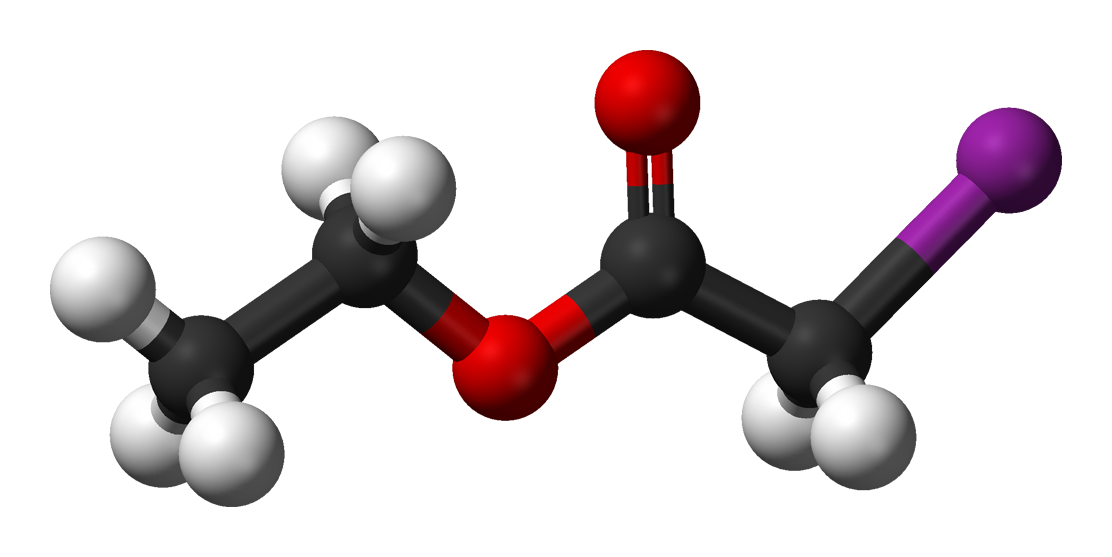
- Ball-and-stick model

Names
- Preferred IUPAC name Ethyl iodoacetate
- Other names Ethyl 2-iodoacetate

Identifiers
CAS Number	623-48-3
3D model (JSmol)	Interactive image
ChemSpider	11683
ECHA InfoCard	100.009.816
PubChem CID	12183
UNII	X9ZR7PV2QF
CompTox Dashboard (EPA)	DTXSID5060770
- InChI: InChI=1S/C4H7IO2/c1-2-7-4(6)3-5/h2-3H2,1H3 Key: MFFXVVHUKRKXCI-UHFFFAOYSA-N; InChI=1/C4H7IO2/c1-2-7-4(6)3-5/h2-3H2,1H3 Key: MFFXVVHUKRKXCI-UHFFFAOYAB
- SMILES: CCOC(=O)CI

Properties
Chemical formula	ICH_{2}CO_{2}CH_{2}CH_{3}
Molar mass	214.002 g·mol^{−1}
Appearance	Clear, light yellow to orange liquid
Density	1.808 g/mL
Boiling point	179 to 180 °C (354 to 356 °F; 452 to 453 K)
Magnetic susceptibility (χ)	−97.6·10^{−6} cm^{3}/mol

Hazards
- GHS labelling
Pictograms	(GHS05: Corrosive) (GHS06: Toxic)
Signal word	Danger
Hazard statements	H300, H314
Precautionary statements	P280, P301+P310+P330, P301+P330+P331, P303+P361+P353, P305+P351+P338+P310

Related compounds
Related esters	Methyl bromoacetate; Ethyl 3-bromopropionate; Ethyl chloroacetate; Ethyl bromoacetate; Ethyl bromodifluoroacetate; Ethyl acetoacetate
Related compounds	Iodoacetic acid; Pepper spray; Chloropicrin
- Except where otherwise noted, data are given for materials in their standard state (at 25 °C [77 °F], 100 kPa). verify (what is ?) Infobox references

Ethyl iodoacetate is an organic compound with the chemical formula ICH_{2}CO_{2}CH_{2}CH_{3}. It is a derivative of ethyl acetate. Under normal conditions, the compound is a clear, light yellow to orange liquid.

== Applications ==
Used by the British during World War I, it was codenamed SK gas, for the initials of South Kensington, where it was developed.

Like many alkyl iodides, ethyl iodoacetate is an alkylating agent, which makes it useful in organic synthesis, yet toxic. Ethyl iodoacetate is also a lachrymatory agent.
