= Ethylene bis(iodoacetate) =

Names
- Preferred IUPAC name Ethane-1,2-diyl bis(iodoacetate)
- Other names Ethane-1,2-diyl bis(2-iodoacetate); S-10

Identifiers
| CAS Number | 5451-51-4 |
| 3D model (JSmol) | Interactive image |
| ChemSpider | 20296 |
| PubChem CID | 21594 |
| UNII | 29S4W5JLV7 |
| CompTox Dashboard (EPA) | DTXSID20202923 |
- InChI: InChI=1S/C6H8I2O4/c7-3-5(9)11-1-2-12-6(10)4-8/h1-4H2 Key: KBCCFFGCRDUANG-UHFFFAOYSA-N
- SMILES: C(COC(=O)CI)OC(=O)CI

Properties
| Chemical formula | C_{6}H_{8}I_{2}O_{4} |
| Molar mass | 397.935 g·mol^{−1} |

Hazards
- Lethal dose or concentration (LD, LC)
| LD_{50} (median dose) | 16.1 mg/kg (mice, intraperitoneal); 4.94 mg/kg (dogs, intravenous) |
- Except where otherwise noted, data are given for materials in their standard state (at 25 °C [77 °F], 100 kPa). Infobox references

Ethylene bis(iodoacetate), also known as S-10, is the iodoacetate ester of ethylene glycol. It's an alkylating agent that has been studied as an anticancer drug.

== See also ==
- Ethylene glycol
- Iodoacetic acid
- Ethyl iodoacetate
- Iodoacetamide
