= Stuart W. Krasner =

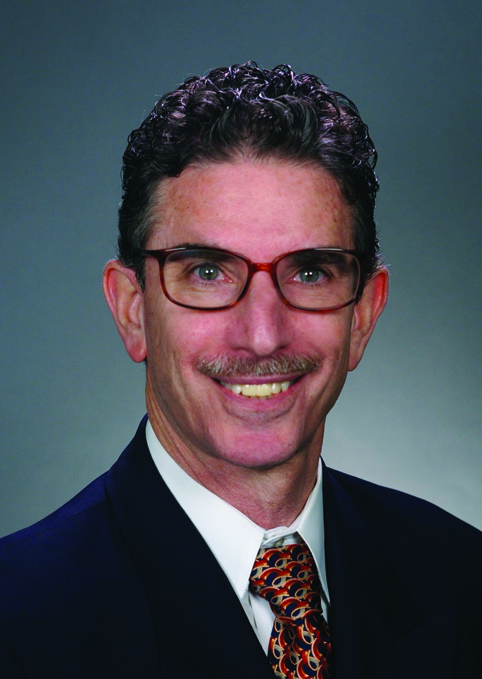
- Born: November 15, 1949 (age 76); Los Angeles, California
- Occupation: Environmental Research Chemist
- Known for: Determining occurrence, formation, and control of disinfection by-products of health and regulatory concern
- Awards: A.P. Black Research Award (2007) American Water Works Association and Dr. Pankaj Parekh Research Innovation Award (2017) Water Research Foundation.

Stuart William Krasner (born 1949), was the Principal Environmental Specialist (retired) with the Metropolitan Water District of Southern California, at the Water Quality Laboratory located in La Verne, California. In his 41 years with Metropolitan, he made revolutionary changes in the field's understanding of how disinfection by-products occur, are formed and how they can be controlled in drinking water. His research contributions include the study of emerging DBPs including those associated with chlorine, chloramines, ozone, chlorine dioxide and bromide/iodide-containing waters. He made groundbreaking advances in understanding the watershed sources of pharmaceuticals and personal care products (PPCPs) and wastewater impacts on drinking-water supplies. For DBPs and PPCPs, he developed analytical methods and occurrence data and he provided technical expertise for the development of regulations for these drinking water contaminants. In the early 1990s, Krasner developed the 3x3 matrix illustrating removal of total organic carbon from drinking water as a function of water alkalinity and initial total organic carbon concentration. The matrix was revised by him and included in the USEPA Stage 1 D/DBP regulation as the enhanced coagulation requirement. Every water utility in the U.S. that is subject to this regulation is required to meet total organic carbon removal requirements along with their exceptions.

He has been a key member of the toxicology and epidemiology community by providing key data for the development of improved carcinogen and non-carcinogen exposure assessments. In his early career at Metropolitan he developed key advances in the control of tastes and odors in drinking water including analytical methods, sensory analysis and determining sources and treatment of off-flavors.

== Early life and education ==
Stuart W. Krasner was born in 1949 in Los Angeles, California, and at the age of two, he moved with his family to Van Nuys, California where he grew up. He attended Kester Avenue Elementary School and Van Nuys High School. His father worked as an aerospace engineer at several companies in the Los Angeles area. His mother worked in the bookkeeping department for Warner Bros. Movie Studios before becoming a homemaker. His brother, Stanley, is three years younger. Stuart married Jan Patrice Barth on September 10, 1989.

He earned his Bachelor of Science in chemistry (1971) and his Master of Science in analytical chemistry (1974) from the University of California, Los Angeles.

== Career ==
Krasner was a teaching and research assistant during his graduate work at UCLA. He worked for the Los Angeles County Sanitation Districts for four years (1974–77) before taking a position as a chemist with the Metropolitan Water District of Southern California in 1977. From the beginning of his career at Metropolitan, Krasner worked at the water quality laboratory which is located at the F.E. Weymouth Treatment Plant in La Verne, California. He held increasingly responsible positions as Research Chemist, Senior Chemist and Senior Research Chemist until being promoted to Principal Environmental Specialist in 1997. He retired from Metropolitan in September 2018.

As Principal Environmental Specialist, Krasner was responsible for the technical direction of DBP research at Metropolitan, as well as studies on the control of other micropollutants of health, regulatory, and aesthetic significance. He was involved in the design of experimental plans for natural organic matter (NOM), DBP, and PPCP research studies, project management, and interpretation of findings. In 1989, his article on the first national survey of multiple-DBP occurrence has received over 1,000 citations by other authors. Another survey of a new generation of DBPs in 2006 has been cited over 1,100 times.

A few of the many externally funded projects for which he was responsible include:

- Co-Principal Investigator of a National Science Foundation (NSF) project on “Drinking Water Safety and Sustainability: Identifying Key Chemical Drivers of Toxicity for Long-Term Solutions in the United States.” (2017 – present)
- Technical advisor for a project on “Global Assessment of Exposure to Trihalomethanes in Drinking Water and Burden of Disease” being conducted by the Barcelona Institute for Global Health (ISGlobal). (2017 – present).
- Principal investigator for Water Research Foundation project on “Nitrosamine Occurrence Survey.” (2013 – 2016).”
- Co-principal investigator for Water Research Foundation project on “Investigating Coagulant Aid Alternatives to polyDADMAC Polymers.” (2012 – 2015)
- Principal investigator for Water Research Foundation project on “Controlling the Formation of Nitrosamines during Water Treatment.” (2012 – 2015)
- Co-principal investigator for Water Research Foundation project on “Optimizing Conventional Treatment for Removal of Cyanobacteria and their Metabolites.” (2011 – 2015)

He was a consultant to the drinking water community since 1983. Some of his projects included:

- Peer reviewer for Imperial College, London, of report on “Review of the Current Toxicological and Occurrence Information Available on Nitrogen-Containing Disinfection By-Products.”
- Technical advisor to the University of the Aegean on reinterpreting DBP data for a European Union project (HiWATE) on DBPs.
- Technical auditor for the European Commission on laboratory practices for a project (HiWATE) on DBPs.
- Technical advisor for Scottish Executive study on “The Formation of Disinfection By-products of Chloramination, Potential Health Implications and Techniques for Minimisation.”
- Workshop participant for National Science Foundation on “Engineering Controls for Ballast Water Discharge: Developing Research Needs.”
- Co-investigator for AwwaRF project on “Improved Exposure Assessment on Existing Cancer Studies.”
- Co-investigator on USEPA project on “Enhanced Evaluation of Disinfectant By-Product Exposures for Epidemiological Studies.”

== Professional associations and journals ==
He made professional contributions to many institutions, including: American Water Works Association (1977 – present), AWWA Research Foundation (now Water Research Foundation, WRF) and American Chemical Society (1975 – present).

For AWWA, he has been involved in over one hundred committees, workgroups and advisory committees, which have included:

- Trustee (2 terms) of the Water Science & Research Division
- Member of Standard Methods Committee (multiple editions); chair of Joint Task Group (JTG) on closed-loop stripping analysis (CLSA) in Water, 17th ed.; Vice-chair of Joint Task Group (JTG) on CLSA, 16th ed.; member of JTG on Taste, 17th ed.; member of JTG on Flavor Profile Analysis (FPA), 17th ed.
- Chair of the D/DBP Technical Advisory Workgroup (TAW)
- Member of Technical Advisory Group (TAG), which provided technical input to Water Utility Council (WUC) on legislative and regulatory issues
- Manager of the D/DBP TAW; included technical management of and coordination with universities and consulting engineering firms performing studies for the D/DBP TAW. Selected projects included:
  - Disinfectants/Disinfection By-Products (D/DBP) Data Base for Regulation Negotiation Process
  - Mathematical Modeling of the Formation of THMs and HAAs in Chlorinated Natural Waters
  - Effect of Coagulation and Ozonation on the Formation of Disinfection By-Products
  - Establishment of database on THM and HAA formation kinetics and impacts of various water quality parameters
  - Development of chlorine and chloramine residual decay equations
- Authored state-of-the-science literature review on nitrosamines for AWWA Government Affairs Office. (2012 – 2013)
- Guest technical editor for special issue of Journal AWWA on nitrosamines

For AWWA Research Foundation (now Water Research Foundation):

- Invited expert for state-of-the-science expert workshop on Evaluating the Scientific Evidence for Chlorination Disinfection By-Products (CDBPs) Associated with Human Health Outcomes (i.e., Bladder Cancer)
- Project Advisory Committee (PAC) on “Exploring formation and Control of Emerging DBPs in Treatment Facilities: Halonitromethanes and Iodo-Trihalomethanes.
- PAC on Quantitative Comparative Mammalian Cell Cytotoxicity and Genotoxicity of Selected Classes of Drinking Water Disinfection By-Products
- PAC on Exploring the Mechanisms of Dihalogenated Acetic Acid Formation (DXAA) During Chloramination

For the American Chemical Society:

- Organized symposium on Occurrence, Formation, Health Effects and Control of Disinfection By-Products in Drinking Water.
- Organized symposium on Natural Organic Matter and Disinfection By-Products in Drinking Water.

Krasner has been a peer-reviewer for many professional and scientific journals including Journal American Water Works Association, Environmental Science & Technology, Ozone: Science & Engineering, Water Research, Journal of Water Supply: Research and Technology – Aqua, Journal of Exposure Analysis and Environmental Epidemiology, Analytical Chemistry, Water Environment Research, The Science of the Total Environment, Chemosphere and Talanta

== Invited lectures and technical exchanges ==
- Tsinghua University, Beijing, Keynote Presentation: Theory and Practices of DBP Formation and Control. April 18, 2012. International Workshop on Urban Water Safety
- Tongji University, Shanghai, on formation and control of emerging disinfection by-products
- Hong Kong University of Science and Technology on formation and control of emerging disinfection by-products in wastewater and drinking water
- Cranfield University, UK, on formation and health effects of disinfection by-products, and balancing the control of disinfection by-products.
- University of California, Berkeley, on sources of NDMA precursors; and the formation, occurrence, and control of NDMA in chloraminated drinking water
- University of Illinois Urbana-Champaign, on formation, occurrence, and control of emerging disinfection by-products of health concern

== Awards and honors ==
- 1990, AWWA Water Quality Division Best Paper Award
- 1996, George A. Elliot Award from the California-Nevada Section of AWWA
- 2007, AWWA's A.P. Black Research Award. This award recognizes “outstanding research contributions to water science and water supply rendered over an appreciable period of time.” The award citation stated: “In recognition of his outstanding, leading-edge research in the water industry in the area of disinfection by-products.”
- 2012, AWWA Engineering and Construction Division Best Paper Award
- 2017, Water Research Foundation's Dr. Pankaj Parekh Research Innovation Award. The award letter stated “Your significant contributions to the Water Research Foundation, both in the volume of work you have conducted, and the longevity of your participation in our research program, made you the unanimous choice for this year’s Research Innovation Award by the Foundation’s Awards Committee.”
- 2019, AWWA Publications Award; AWWA Water Quality & Technology Division Best Paper Award

== See also ==
- Disinfection by-product
- trihalomethanes
- haloacetic acids
- halonitromethanes
- haloacetonitriles
- halofuranones
- iodoacetic acid
- nitrosamines

== Books and edited works ==
- Off-Flavours in Drinking Water and Aquatic Organisms. (P.-E. Persson, F.B. Whitfield, & S.W. Krasner, eds.). 1992. Water Sci. & Technol., Vol. 25, No. 2.
- Natural Organic Matter and Disinfection By-Products: Characterization and Control in Drinking Water (S.E. Barrett, S.W. Krasner, & G.L. Amy, eds.). 2000. ACS, Washington, D.C.
- Disinfection By-Products in Drinking Water: Occurrence, Formation, Health Effects, and Control (T. Karanfil, S.W. Krasner, P. Westerhoff, & Y. Xie, eds.). 2008. ACS, Washington, D.C.
- Special issue on nitrosamines (S.W. Krasner, guest technical editor). June 2017. Jour. AWWA

== Selected publications ==
- S.W. Krasner, M.J. McGuire, & V.B. Ferguson. 1985. Tastes and Odors: The Flavor Profile Method. Jour. AWWA, 77:3:34.
- S.W. Krasner, S.E. Barrett, M.S. Dale, & C.J. Hwang. 1989. Free Chlorine Versus Monochloramine for Controlling Off-Tastes and Off-Odors. Jour. AWWA, 81:2:86.
- S.W. Krasner, M.J. McGuire, J.G. Jacangelo, N.L. Patania, K.M. Reagan, & E.M. Aieta. 1989. The Occurrence of Disinfection By-Products in U.S. Drinking Water. Jour. AWWA, 81:8:41.
- S.W. Krasner, W.H. Glaze, H.S. Weinberg, P.A. Daniel, & I.N. Najm. 1993. Formation and Control of Bromate During Ozonation of Waters Containing Bromide. Jour. AWWA, 85:1:73.
- S.W. Krasner, & G.L. Amy. 1995. Jar-Test Evaluations of Enhanced Coagulation. Jour. AWWA, 87:10:93.
- S.W. Krasner, J.-P. Croué, J. Buffle, & E.M. Perdue. 1996. Three Approaches for Characterizing NOM. Jour. AWWA, 88:6:66.
- S.W. Krasner, H.S. Weinberg, S.D. Richardson, S.J. Pastor, R. Chinn, M.J. Sclimenti, G.D. Onstad, and A.D. Thruston Jr. 2006. Occurrence of a New Generation of Disinfection Byproducts. Environ. Sci. Technol., 40(23):7175-7185.
- S.W. Krasner, P. Westerhoff, B. Chen, B.E. Rittmann, S.-N. Nam, & G. Amy. 2009. Impact of Wastewater Treatment Processes on Organic Carbon, Organic Nitrogen, and DBP Precursors in Effluent Organic Matter. Environ. Sci. Technol., 43(8):2911-2918.
- S.W. Krasner, P. Westerhoff, B. Chen, B.E. Rittmann, & G. Amy. 2009. Occurrence of Disinfection Byproducts in United States Wastewater Treatment Plant Effluents Environ. Sci. Technol., 43(21):8320–8325.
- O. Lu, S.W. Krasner, & S. Liang. 2011. Modeling Approach to Treatability Analysis of an Existing Treatment Plant. Jour. AWWA, 103(4):103–117.
- S.W. Krasner, W.A. Mitch, D.L. McCurry, D. Hanigan, & P. Westerhoff. 2013. Formation, Precursors, Control, and Occurrence of Nitrosamines in Drinking Water: A Review. Water Res., 47:4433-4450.
