= Salt water chlorination =

Process to chlorinate swimming pools and hot tubs

Salt water chlorination is a process that uses dissolved salt (1000–4000 ppm or 1–4 g/L) for the chlorination of swimming pools and hot tubs. The chlorine generator (also known as salt cell, salt generator, salt chlorinator, or SWG) uses electrolysis in the presence of dissolved salt to produce chlorine gas or its dissolved forms, hypochlorous acid and sodium hypochlorite, which are already commonly used as sanitizing agents in pools. Hydrogen is produced as a byproduct too.

== Distinction from traditional pool chlorination ==
The presence of chlorine in traditional swimming pools can be described as a combination of free available chlorine (FAC) and combined available chlorine (CAC). While FAC is composed of the free chlorine that is available for disinfecting the water, the CAC includes chloramines, which are formed by the reaction of FAC with amines (introduced into the pool by human perspiration, saliva, mucus, urine, and other biologics, and by insects and other pests). Chloramines are responsible for the "chlorine smell" of pools, as well as skin and eye irritation. These problems are the result of insufficient levels of free available chlorine, and indicate a pool that must be "shocked" by the addition of 5–10 times the normal amount of chlorine. In saltwater pools, the generator uses electrolysis to continuously produce free chlorine. As such, a saltwater pool or hot tub is not actually chlorine-free; it simply utilizes added salt and a chlorine generator instead of direct addition of chlorine. It also burns off chloramines in the same manner as traditional shock (oxidizer). As with traditionally chlorinated pools, saltwater pools must be monitored in order to maintain proper water chemistry. Low chlorine levels can be caused by insufficient salt, incorrect (low) chlorine-generation setting on the SWG unit, higher-than-normal chlorine demand, low stabilizer, sun exposure, insufficient pump speed, or mechanical issues with the chlorine generator. Salt count can be lowered due to splash-out, backwashing, and dilution via rainwater.

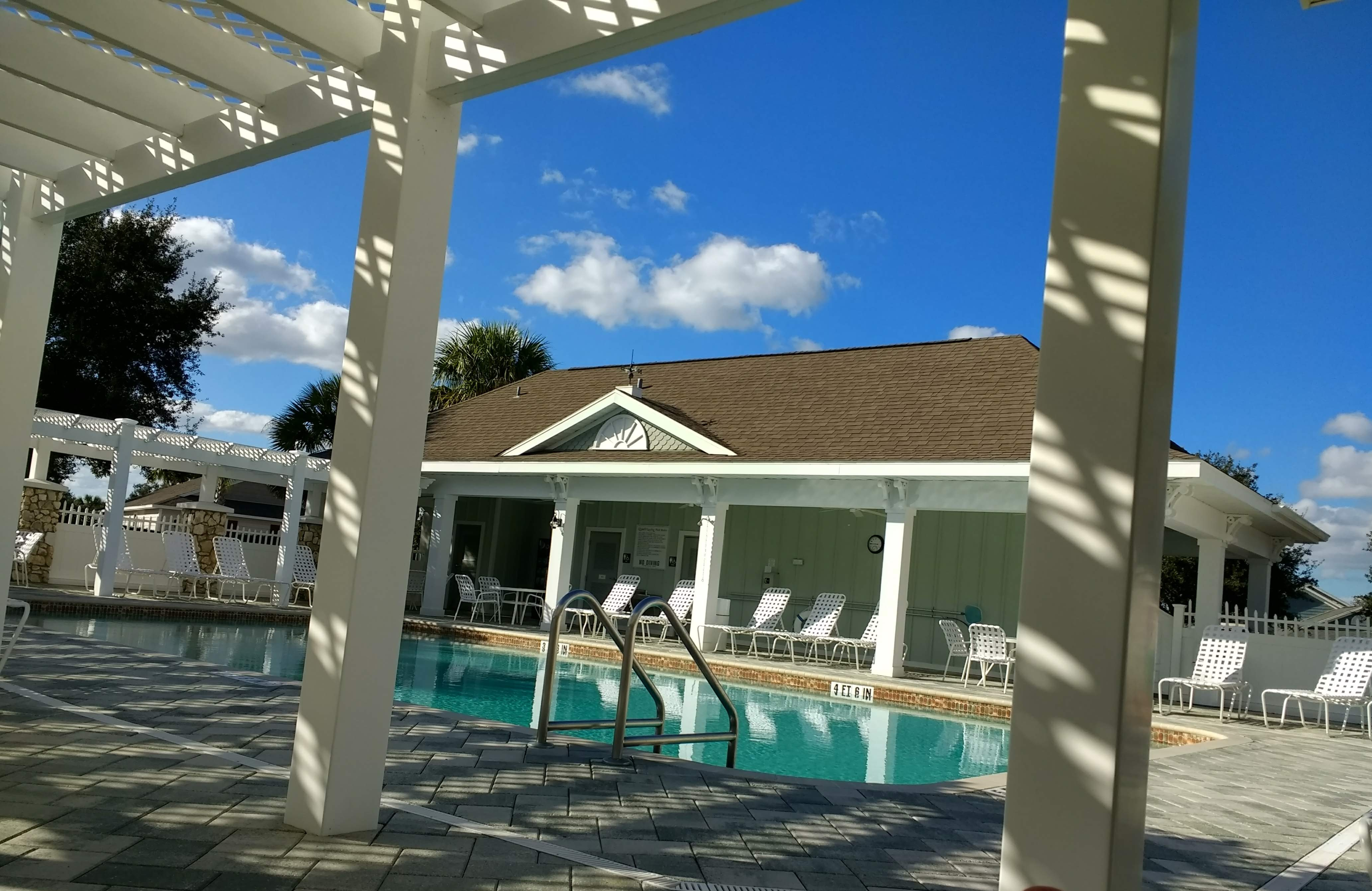
A salt water chlorinated pool at The Villages, Florida.

== Health concerns ==
Research has shown that because saltwater pools still use chlorine sanitization, they generate the same disinfection byproducts (DBPs) that are present in traditional pools. Of highest concern are haloketones and trihalomethanes (THMs) of those the predominant form being bromoform. Very high levels of bromoform—up to 1.3 mg per liter, or 13 times the World Health Organization's guideline values—have been found in some public saltwater swimming pools.

Manufacturers have been producing saltwater chlorine generators in the United States since the early 1980s, and they first appeared commercially in New Zealand in the early 1970s (the Aquatech IG4500).

== Operation ==
The chlorinator cell consists of parallel titanium plates coated with ruthenium and sometimes iridium. Older models make use of perforated (or mesh) plates rather than solid plates. Electrolysis naturally attracts calcium and other minerals to the plates. Thus, depending on water chemistry and magnitude of use, the cell will require periodic cleaning in a mild acid solution (1 part HCl to 15 parts water) which will remove the buildup of calcium compound crystals, such as calcium carbonate or calcium nitrate. Excessive buildup can reduce the effectiveness of the cell. Running the chlorinator for long periods with insufficient salt in the pool can strip the coating off the cell which then requires an expensive replacement, as can using too strong an acid wash.

Saltwater pools can also require stabilizer (cyanuric acid) to help stop the sun's UV rays from breaking down free chlorine in the pool. Usual levels are 20–50 ppm. They also require the pH to be kept between 7.2 and 7.8 with the chlorine being more effective if the pH is kept closer to 7.2. The average salt levels are usually in the 3000-5000 ppm range, much less than the ocean, which has salt levels of around 35,000 ppm. In swimming pools, salt is typically poured across the bottom and swept with the pool brush until it dissolves; if concentrated brine is allowed into the return-water system it can cause the chlorinator cell to malfunction due to overconductivity.

Salt water chlorination produces an excess of hydroxide ions, and this requires the frequent addition of hydrochloric acid (HCl, also known as muriatic acid) to maintain pH.

== Benefits and disadvantages ==
The benefits of salt systems in pools are the convenience and the constant delivery of pure chlorine-based sanitizer. The reduction of irritating chloramines versus traditional chlorinating methods and the "softening" effect of electrolysis reducing dissolved alkali minerals in the water are also perceived as benefits. For some people that have sensitivities to chlorine, these systems may be less offensive.

Disadvantages are the initial cost of the system, maintenance, loss of salt when pool is partially drained for winter and the cost of replacement cells. Salt is corrosive and will damage some metals and some improperly-sealed stone. However, as the ideal saline concentration of a salt-chlorinated pool is very low (<3,500ppm, the threshold for human perception of salt by taste; seawater is about ten times this concentration), damage usually occurs due to improperly-maintained pool chemistry or improper maintenance of the electrolytic cell. Pool equipment manufacturers typically will not warrant stainless steel products damaged by saline pools. Calcium and other alkali precipitate buildup will occur naturally on the cathode plate, and sometimes in the pool itself as "scaling". Regular maintenance of the cell is necessary; failure to do so will reduce the effectiveness of the cell. Certain designs of saline chlorinators use a "reverse-polarity" method that will regularly switch the roles of the two electrodes between anode and cathode, causing this calcium buildup to dissolve off the accumulating electrode. Such systems reduce but do not eliminate the need to clean the electrolytic cell and the occurrence of calcium scale in the water.

As chlorine is generated, pH will rise causing the chlorine to be less effective. Many systems with chemistry automation can sense the rising pH and automatically introduce either CO_{2} or hydrochloric acid in order to bring the pH back to the target level. Automation systems will also manage levels of sanitizer by monitoring the ORP or redox levels of the water. This allows only the needed amount of chlorine to be generated based on the demand.

Sodium bromide can be used instead of sodium chloride, which produces a bromine pool. The benefits and downsides are the same as those of a salt system. It is not necessary to use a chloride-based acid to balance the pH. Also, bromine is only effective as a sanitizer, not as an oxidizer, leaving a need for adding a "shock" such as hydrogen peroxide or any chlorine-based shock to burn off inorganic waste and free up combined bromines. This extra step is not needed in a sodium chloride system, as chlorine is effective as both a sanitizer and an oxidizer. A user would only need to "super chlorinate" or increase chlorine production of the cell occasionally. That would normally be less than once a week or after heavy bather loads.
