= Ethyl chloroacetate =

Names
- Preferred IUPAC name Ethyl chloroacetate
- Other names: Ethyl 2-chloroacetate; Ethyl monochloroacetate

Identifiers
CAS Number	105-39-5
3D model (JSmol)	Interactive image
ChEMBL	ChEMBL3186148
ChemSpider	7465
ECHA InfoCard	100.002.995
EC Number	203-294-0
PubChem CID	7751
UNII	6H07TEH4TF
UN number	1181
CompTox Dashboard (EPA)	DTXSID4026715
- InChI: InChI=1S/C4H7ClO2/c1-2-7-4(6)3-5/h2-3H2,1H3 Key: VEUUMBGHMNQHGO-UHFFFAOYSA-N; InChI=1/C4H7ClO2/c1-2-7-4(6)3-5/h2-3H2,1H3 Key: VEUUMBGHMNQHGO-UHFFFAOYAS
- SMILES: ClCC(=O)OCC

Properties
Chemical formula	ClCH_{2}CO_{2}CH_{2}CH_{3}
Molar mass	122.55 g·mol^{−1}
Density	1.145 g/mL
Melting point	−26 °C (−15 °F; 247 K)
Boiling point	143 °C (289 °F; 416 K)
Magnetic susceptibility (χ)	−72.3·10^{−6} cm^{3}/mol

Hazards
- GHS labelling
Pictograms	(GHS06: Toxic) (GHS09: Environmental hazard)
Signal word	Danger
Hazard statements	H301, H311, H331, H400
Precautionary statements	P261, P262, P264, P270, P271, P273, P280, P301+P316, P302+P352, P304+P340, P316, P321, P330, P361+P364, P391, P403+P233, P405, P501

Related compounds
Related esters	Ethyl bromoacetate; Ethyl 3-bromopropionate; Ethyl iodoacetate; Ethyl bromodifluoroacetate; Ethyl acetoacetate
Related compounds	Chloroacetic acid; Chloropicrin
- Except where otherwise noted, data are given for materials in their standard state (at 25 °C [77 °F], 100 kPa). Infobox references

Ethyl chloroacetate is an organic compound with the chemical formula ClCH_{2}CO_{2}CH_{2}CH_{3}. It is used primarily in the chemical industry. It is used as a solvent for organic synthesis and as an intermediate in the production of pesticides (such as sodium fluoroacetate).

== Use ==
- An example for the use of this agent was in the synthesis of cinepazet.
- Synthesis of Fenmetramide.
