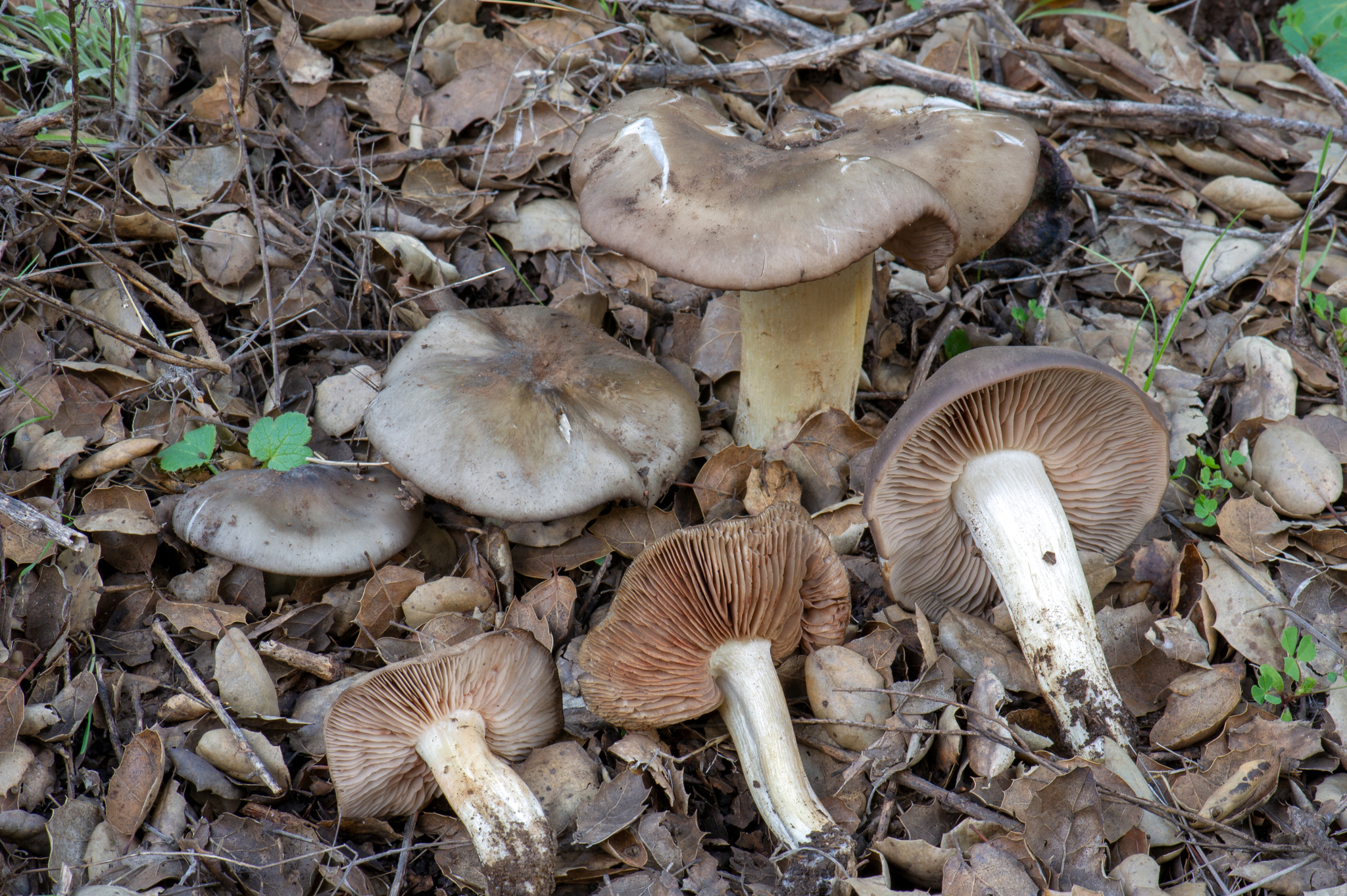

Scientific classification
- Kingdom: Fungi
- Division: Basidiomycota
- Class: Agaricomycetes
- Order: Agaricales
- Family: Entolomataceae
- Genus: Entoloma
- Species: E. ferruginans

Binomial name
- Entoloma ferruginans Peck, 1895

= Entoloma ferruginans =

Bleachy Entoloma

Species of fungus

Entoloma ferruginans
- Mycological characteristics
- Gills on hymenium
- Cap is convex
- Hymenium is free or emarginate
- Stipe is bare
- Spore print is pink to salmon
- Ecology is saprotrophic
- Edibility is not recommended

Entoloma ferruginans is a species of mushroom first described by Charles Horton Peck in 1895 from a type specimen collected under oak trees in Pasadena, California.

The grayish cap is up to 12 centimetres (4 3/4 in) wide. The stem is 15 cm long and up to 4 cm (1 1/2 in) thick. The spore print is pinkish. Its scent resembles a chlorinated swimming pool, hence the common name bleachy entoloma. It resembles some species in its genus, with DNA testing needed to distinguish it from E. cinereolamellatum.

It lives in mycorrhizal association with live oaks south of the San Francisco Bay, being found from December to February.
