= Shock chlorination =

Process used to reduce bacterial and algal residue in water

Shock chlorination is a process used in many swimming pools, water wells, springs, and other water sources to reduce the bacterial and algal residue in the water. Shock chlorination is performed by mixing a large amount of sodium hypochlorite, which can be in the form of a powder or a liquid such as chlorine bleach, into the water. The common advice is that the amount added must raise the level of chlorine to 10X the level (in parts per million) of chloramines present in the pool water; this is "shocking". A lesser ratio is termed superchlorinating. Water that is being shock chlorinated should not be swum in or drunk until the sodium hypochlorite count in the water goes down to three ppm or less which is generally more than 6 hours. Commercial sodium hypochlorite should not be mixed with commercial calcium hypochlorite, as there is a risk of explosion. Although a verb for superchlorination, "shock" is often misunderstood (through marketing and sales language) to be a unique type of product.

== Drawbacks ==
While "shocking" pools to reduce the buildup of chloramines works with inorganic, ammonia-based chloramines, in two studies it was found ineffective with the organic chloramines present in all pool water e.g. with creatinine, an organic component in human sweat. Indeed, superchlorination produces free chlorine that reacts with organic contaminants to form a variety of disinfection byproducts (DBPs) which are hazardous to swimmer health e.g. one of the worst DBPs is the noxious and volatile trichloramine (NCl_{3}), well known for irritating the eyes nearby a pool. It has been pointed out that ozone is an excellent alternative, a much more effective oxidizer than chlorine shock.

== See also ==
- Water chlorination
- Shock Chlorination Procedure by High-Pressure Metering Pump Injection
