= Triiodoacetic acid =

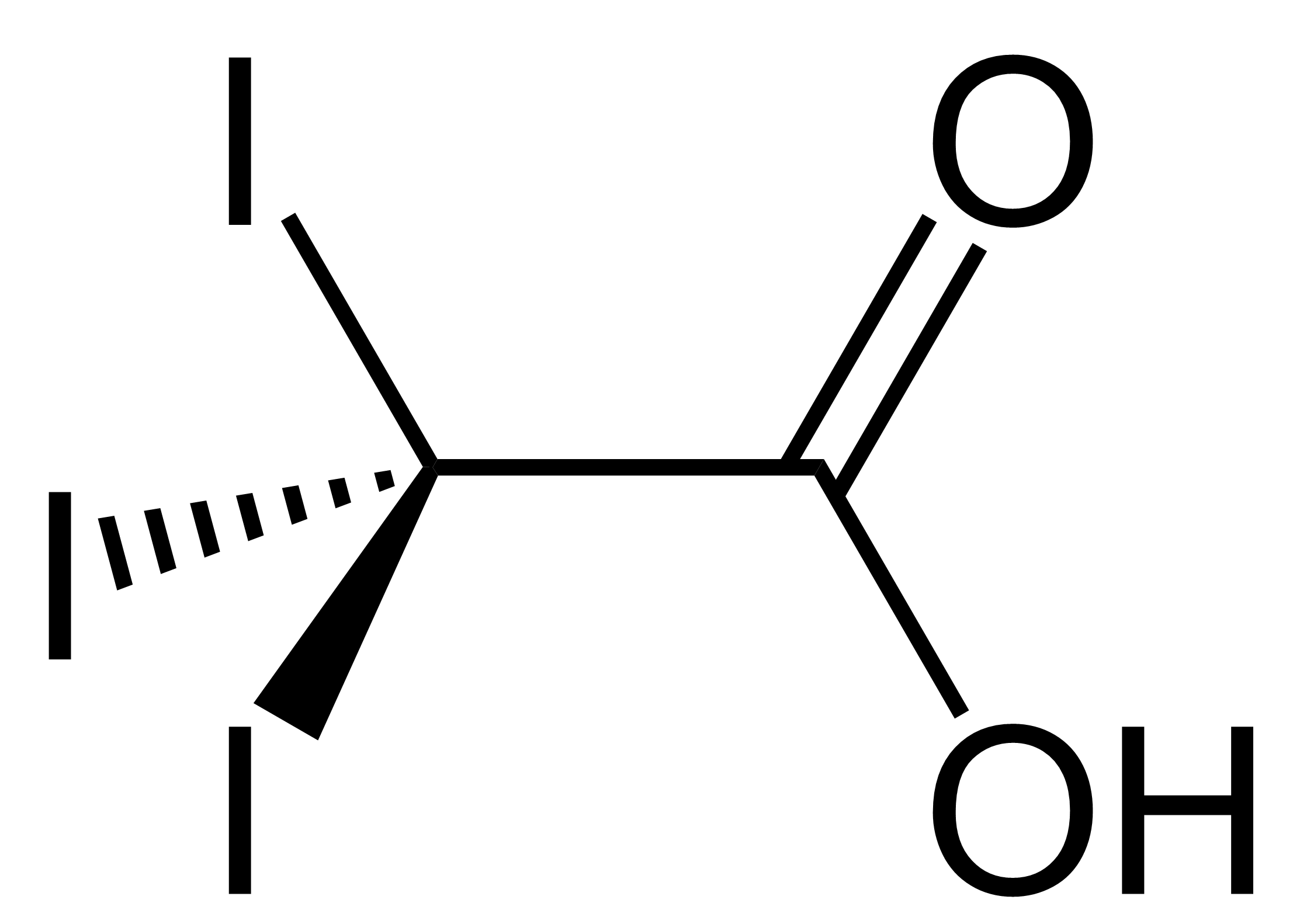

Names
- IUPAC name 2,2,2-triiodoacetic acid
- Other names: Triiodoacetic acid; Triiodoethanoic acid

Identifiers
CAS Number	594-68-3
3D model (JSmol)	Interactive image
ChemSpider	62210
EC Number	209-850-9
PubChem CID	68988
UNII	4A8GUP5482
CompTox Dashboard (EPA)	DTXSID20208127
- InChI: InChI=1S/C2HI3O2/c3-2(4,5)1(6)7/h(H,6,7) Key: WWHZZMHPRRFPGP-UHFFFAOYSA-N
- SMILES: C(=O)(C(I)(I)I)O

Properties
Chemical formula	C_{2}HI_{3}O_{2}
Molar mass	437.741 g·mol^{−1}
Appearance	Yellow crystalline solid
Density	3.884±0.06 g/cm^{3} (predicted)
Melting point	135–140 °C (275–284 °F; 408–413 K)
Boiling point	347.7±42.0 °C (predicted)
Solubility in water	Insoluble
Solubility	Slightly soluble in chloroform, ethyl acetate, methanol. Sparingly soluble in DMSO.
Acidity (pK_{a})	1.29±0.41 (predicted)
Refractive index (n_{D})	1.883 (predicted)

Hazards
- Occupational safety and health (OHS/OSH)
Main hazards	Highly toxic
- GHS labelling
Pictograms	(GHS05: Corrosive) (GHS06: Toxic)
Signal word	Danger
Hazard statements	H301, H314
Precautionary statements	P280, P301+P310, P305+P351+P338, P310

Related compounds
Related compounds	Acetic acid; Iodoacetic acid; Diiodoacetic acid; Trifluoroacetic acid; Trichloroacetic acid; Tribromoacetic acid
- Except where otherwise noted, data are given for materials in their standard state (at 25 °C [77 °F], 100 kPa). Infobox references

Triiodoacetic acid is an organic compound with the chemical formula CI_{3}COOH. It is a yellow solid. It is one of the haloacetic acids.

== Synthesis ==
Triiodoacetic acid can be synthesized in good yields by reacting malonic acid, iodine and aqueous iodic acid, but triiodoacetic acid is contaminated with large amounts of unreacted iodine, and because of that it looks dark brown. If iodic to malonic acid ratio is 1.5 by weight, triiodoacetic acid as a major product (50-60 %) can be obtained.

5 CH_{2}(COOH)_{2} + 6 I_{2} + 3 HIO_{3} → 5 CI_{3}COOH + 5 CO_{2} + 9 H_{2}O

It can also be prepared by reacting diiodomalonic acid and a suspension of iodine in aqueous iodic acid, with a 30 % yield.

5 CI_{2}(COOH)_{2} + 2 I_{2} + HIO_{3} → 5 CI_{3}COOH + 5 CO_{2} + 3 H_{2}O

Diiodomalonic acid itself is prepared by reaction of malonic acid with iodine and iodic acid in formic acid as a solvent.

== Properties ==
Triiodoacetic acid is a yellow crystalline solid, but can be dark brown due to impurities of iodine. Crystalline triiodoacetic acid is quite stable at room temperature, but decomposes rapidly at higher temperatures to iodine, iodoform and carbon dioxide. It is very soluble in polar organic solvents, but the solutions are extremely unstable, rapidly getting iodine discoloration. It is insoluble in water, but its aqueous suspensions are quite stable. It is soluble in dilute (4 %) aqueous NaOH, but decomposes rapidly. In more concentrated NaOH it is insoluble, with little decomposition.

The lead and sodium salts of triiodoacetic acid were isolated in 1958, but attempts to isolate the calcium salt were unsuccessful.
