= Swimming pool sanitation =

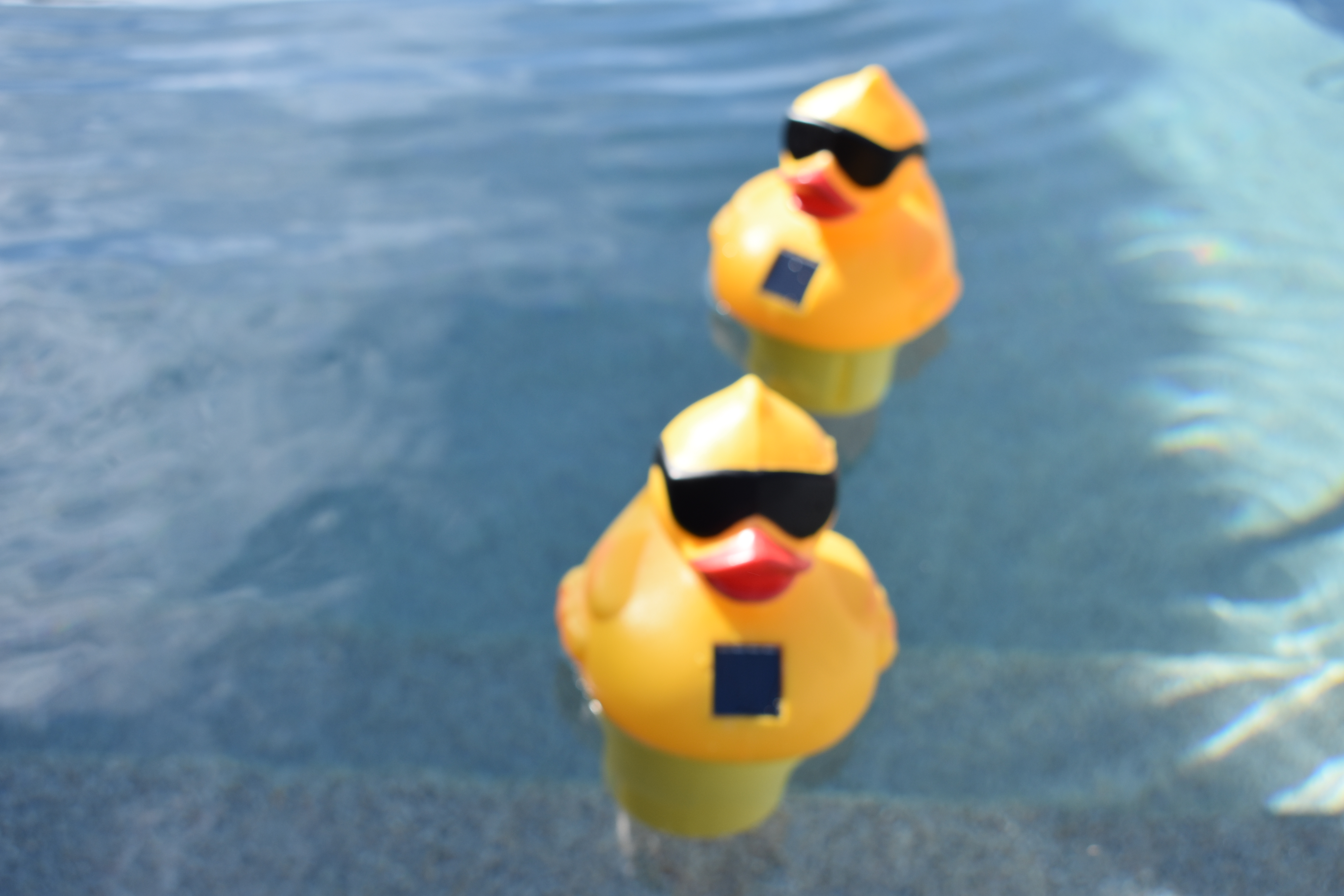
Chlorinators designed to resemble rubber ducks

Swimming pool sanitation is the process of ensuring healthy conditions in swimming pools. Proper sanitation is needed to maintain the visual clarity of water and to prevent the transmission of infectious waterborne diseases.

== Methods ==
Two distinct and separate methods are employed in the sanitation of a swimming pool. The filtration system removes organic waste on a daily basis by using the sieve baskets inside the skimmer and circulation pump and the sand unit with a backwash facility for easy removal of organic waste from the water circulation. Disinfection - normally in the form of hypochlorous acid (HClO) - kills infectious microorganisms. Alongside these two distinct measures within the pool owner's jurisdiction, swimmer hygiene and cleanliness helps reduce organic waste build-up.

== Guidelines ==
The World Health Organization has published international guidelines for the safety of swimming pools and similar recreational-water environments, including standards for minimizing microbial and chemical hazards. The United States Centers for Disease Control and Prevention also provides information on pool sanitation and water related illnesses for health professionals and the public. The main organizations providing certifications for pool and spa operators and technicians are the National Swimming Pool Foundation and Association of Pool & Spa Professionals. The certifications are accepted by many state and local health departments.

== Contaminants and disease ==
Swimming pool contaminants are introduced from environmental sources and swimmers. Affecting primarily outdoor swimming pools, environmental contaminants include windblown dirt and debris, incoming water from unsanitary sources, rain containing microscopic algae spores and droppings from birds possibly harboring disease-causing pathogens. Indoor pools are less susceptible to environmental contaminants.

Contaminants introduced by swimmers can dramatically influence the operation of indoor and outdoor swimming pools. Contaminants include micro-organisms from infected swimmers and body oils including sweat, cosmetics, suntan lotion, urine, saliva and fecal matter; for example, it was estimated by researchers that swimming pools contain, on average, 30 to 80 mL of urine for each person that uses the pool. In addition, the interaction between disinfectants and pool water contaminants can produce a mixture of chloramines and other disinfection by-products. The journal Environmental Science & Technology reported that sweat and urine react with chlorine and produce trichloramine and cyanogen chloride, two chemicals dangerous to human health. Nitrosamines are another type of the disinfection by-products that are of concern as a potential health hazard.

Acesulfame potassium is widely used in the human diet and excreted by the kidneys. It has been used by researchers as a marker to estimate the degree to which swimming pools are contaminated by urine. It was estimated that a commercial-size swimming pool of 220,000 gallons would contain about 20 gallons of urine, equivalent to about 2 gallons of urine in a typical residential pool.

Pathogenic contaminants are of greatest concern in swimming pool treatment, as they have been associated with numerous recreational water illnesses (RWIs). Public health pathogens can be present in swimming pools as viruses, bacteria, protozoa and fungi. Diarrhea is the most commonly reported illness associated with pathogenic contaminants, while other diseases associated with untreated pools are Cryptosporidiosis and Giardiasis. Other illnesses commonly occurring in poorly maintained swimming pools include otitis externa (swimmer's ear), skin rashes. and respiratory infections.

== Maintenance and hygiene ==
Contamination can be minimized by hygiene practices such as showering before and after swimming, and not letting children with intestinal disorders swim. Effective treatments are needed to address contaminants in pool water, because preventing the introduction of pool contaminants, pathogenic and non-pathogenic, into swimming pools is, in practice, impossible.

A well-maintained, properly operating pool filtration and re-circulation system is the first barrier, combating the contaminants large enough to be filtered. Rapid removal of these filterable contaminants reduces the impact on the disinfection system thereby limiting the formation of chloramines, restricting the formation of disinfection by-products and optimizing sanitation effectiveness. To kill pathogens and help prevent recreational water illnesses, pool operators must maintain proper levels of chlorine or another sanitizer.

Over time, calcium from municipal water tends to accumulate, developing salt deposits in the swimming pool walls and equipment (filters, pumps), reducing their effectiveness. Therefore, it is advised to either completely drain the pool, and refill it with fresh water, or recycle the existing pool water, using reverse osmosis. The advantage of the latter method is that 90% of the water can be reused.

Pool operators must also store and handle cleaning and sanitation chemicals safely.

== Prevention of diseases in swimming pools and spas ==
Disease prevention should be the top priority for every water quality management program for pool and spa operators. Disinfection is critical to protect against pathogens, and is best managed through routine monitoring and maintenance of chemical feed equipment to ensure optimum chemical levels in accordance with state and local regulations.

Chemical parameters include disinfectant levels according to regulated pesticide label directions. pH should be kept between 7.2 and 7.8. Human tears have a pH of 7.4, making this an ideal point to set a pool. More often than not, it is improper pH and not the sanitizer that is responsible for irritating swimmers' skin and eyes.

Total alkalinity should be 80–120 ppm and calcium hardness between 200 and 400 ppm.

Good hygienic behavior at swimming pools is also important for reducing health risk factors at swimming pools and spas. Showering before swimming can reduce introduction of contaminants to the pool, and showering again after swimming will help to remove any non-ingested contaminants that may have been picked up by the swimmer.

Those with diarrhea or other gastroenteritis illnesses should not swim within 2 weeks of an outbreak, especially children. The Cryptosporidium parasite is chlorine resistant, surviving more than 7 days in properly chlorinated water.

In order to minimize exposure to pathogens, swimmers should avoid getting water into their mouths, and should never swallow pool or spa water.

== Standards ==
Maintaining an effective concentration of disinfectant is critically important in assuring the safety and health of swimming pool and spa users. When any of these pool chemicals are used, it is very important to keep the pH of the pool in the range 7.2 to 7.8 – according to the Langelier Saturation Index, or 7.8 to 8.2 – according to the Hamilton Index; higher pH drastically reduces the sanitizing power of the chlorine due to reduced oxidation-reduction potential (ORP), while lower pH produces more rapid loss of chlorine and causes bather discomfort, especially to the eyes. However, according to the Hamilton Index, a higher pH can reduce unnecessary chlorine consumption while still remaining effective at preventing algae and bacteria growth.

To help ensure the health of bathers and protect pool equipment, it is essential to perform routine monitoring of water quality factors (or "parameters") on a regular basis. This process becomes the essence of an optimum water quality management program.

== Systems and disinfection methods ==
=== Chlorine and bromine methods ===
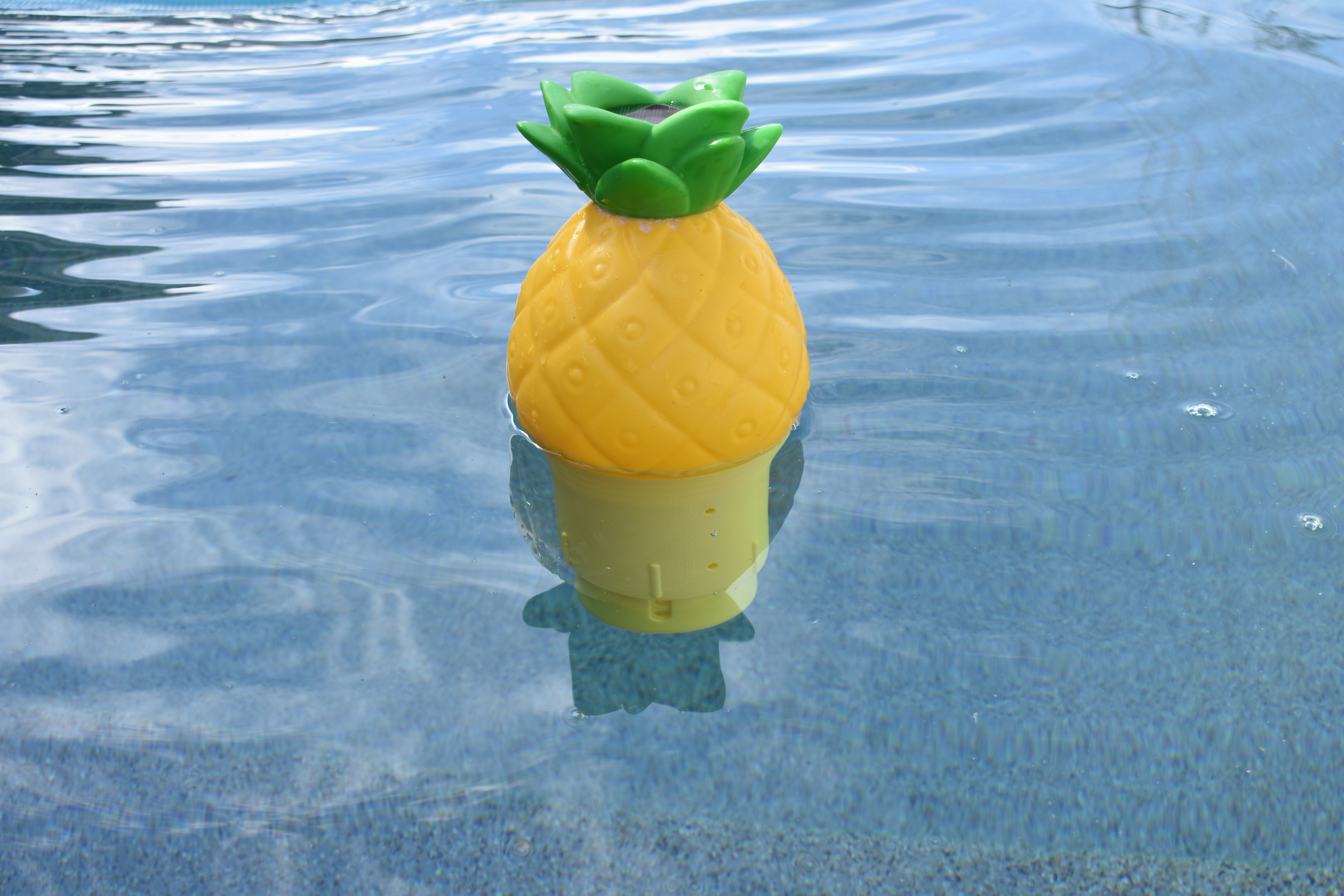
Pool chlorinators are popular methods of pool sanitation.

Conventional halogen-based oxidizers such as chlorine and bromine are convenient and economical primary sanitizers for swimming pools and provide a residual level of sanitizer that remains in the water. Chlorine-releasing compounds are the most popular and frequently used in swimming pools whereas bromine-releasing compounds have found heightened popularity in spas and hot tubs. Both are members of the halogen group with demonstrated ability to destroy and deactivate a wide range of potentially dangerous bacteria and viruses in swimming pools and spas. Both exhibit three essential elements as ideal first-line-of-defense sanitizers for swimming pools and spas: they are fast-acting and enduring (timescale of hours to weeks), they are effective algaecides, and they oxidize undesired contaminants.

Swimming pools can be disinfected with a variety of chlorine-releasing compounds. The most basic of these compounds is molecular chlorine (Cl_{2}); however, its application is primarily in large commercial public swimming pools. Inorganic forms of chlorine-releasing compounds frequently used in residential and public swimming pools include sodium hypochlorite commonly known as liquid bleach or simply bleach, calcium hypochlorite and lithium hypochlorite. Chlorine residuals from Cl_{2} and inorganic chlorine-releasing compounds break down rapidly in sunlight. To extend their disinfectant usefulness and persistence in outdoor settings, swimming pools treated with one or more of the inorganic forms of chlorine-releasing compounds can be supplemented with cyanuric acid – a granular stabilizing agent capable of extending the active chlorine residual half-life (t_{½}) by four to sixfold.

Chlorinated isocyanurates, a family of organic chlorine-releasing compounds, are stabilized to prevent UV degradation due to the presence of cyanurate as part of their chemical backbone. These are commonly sold for general use in small summer pools, where the water is expected to be used for only a few months and is expected to be regularly topped up with fresh, due to evaporation and splash loss. It is important to change the water frequently, otherwise, levels of cyanuric acid will build up to beyond the point at which the mechanism functions. Excess cyanurates will actually work in reverse and will inhibit the chlorine. A steadily lowering pH value of the water may at first be noticed. Algal growth may become visible, even though chlorine tests show sufficient levels.

Chlorine reacting with urea in urine and other nitrogen-containing wastes from bathers can produce chloramines. Chloramines typically occur when an insufficient amount of chlorine is used to disinfect a contaminated pool. Chloramines are generally responsible for the noxious, irritating smell prominently occurring in indoor pool settings. A common way to remove chloramines is to "superchlorinate" (commonly called "shocking") the pool with a high dose of inorganic chlorine sufficient to deliver 10 ppm chlorine. Regular superchlorination (every two weeks in summer) helps to eliminate these unpleasant odors in the pool. Levels of chloramines and other volatile compounds in water can be minimized by reducing contaminants that lead to their formation (e.g., urea, creatinine, amino acids and personal care products) as well as by use of non-chlorine "shock oxidizers" such as potassium peroxymonosulfate.

Medium pressure UV technology is used to control the level of chloramines in indoor pools. It is also used as a secondary form of disinfection to address chlorine-tolerant pathogens. A properly sized and maintained UV system should remove the need to shock for chloramines, although shocking would still be used to address a fecal accident or dead animal in the pool. UV will not replace chlorine but is used to control the level of chloramines, which are responsible for the odor, irritation, and enhanced corrosion at an indoor pool.

=== Copper ion system ===
Copper ion systems use an electric current across .500 gm bars (solid copper, or a mixture of copper and .100 gm or silver) to free copper ions into the flow of pool water to kill organisms such as algae in the water and provide a "residual" in the water. Alternative systems also use titanium plates to produce oxygen in the water to help degrade organic compounds.

== Private pool filtration ==
=== Water pumps ===
An electrically operated water pump is the prime motivator in recirculating the water from the pool. Water is forced through a filter and then returned to the pool. Using a water pump by itself is often not sufficient to completely sanitize a pool. Commercial and public pool pumps usually run 24 hours a day for the entire operating season of the pool. Residential pool pumps are typically run for 4 hours per day in winter (when the pool is not in use) and up to 24 hours in summer. To save electricity costs, most pools run water pumps for between 6 hours and 12 hours in summer with the pump being controlled by an electronic timer.

Most pool pumps available today incorporate a small filter basket as the last effort to avoid leaf or hair contamination reaching the close-tolerance impeller section of the pump.

=== Filtration units ===
==== Sand ====
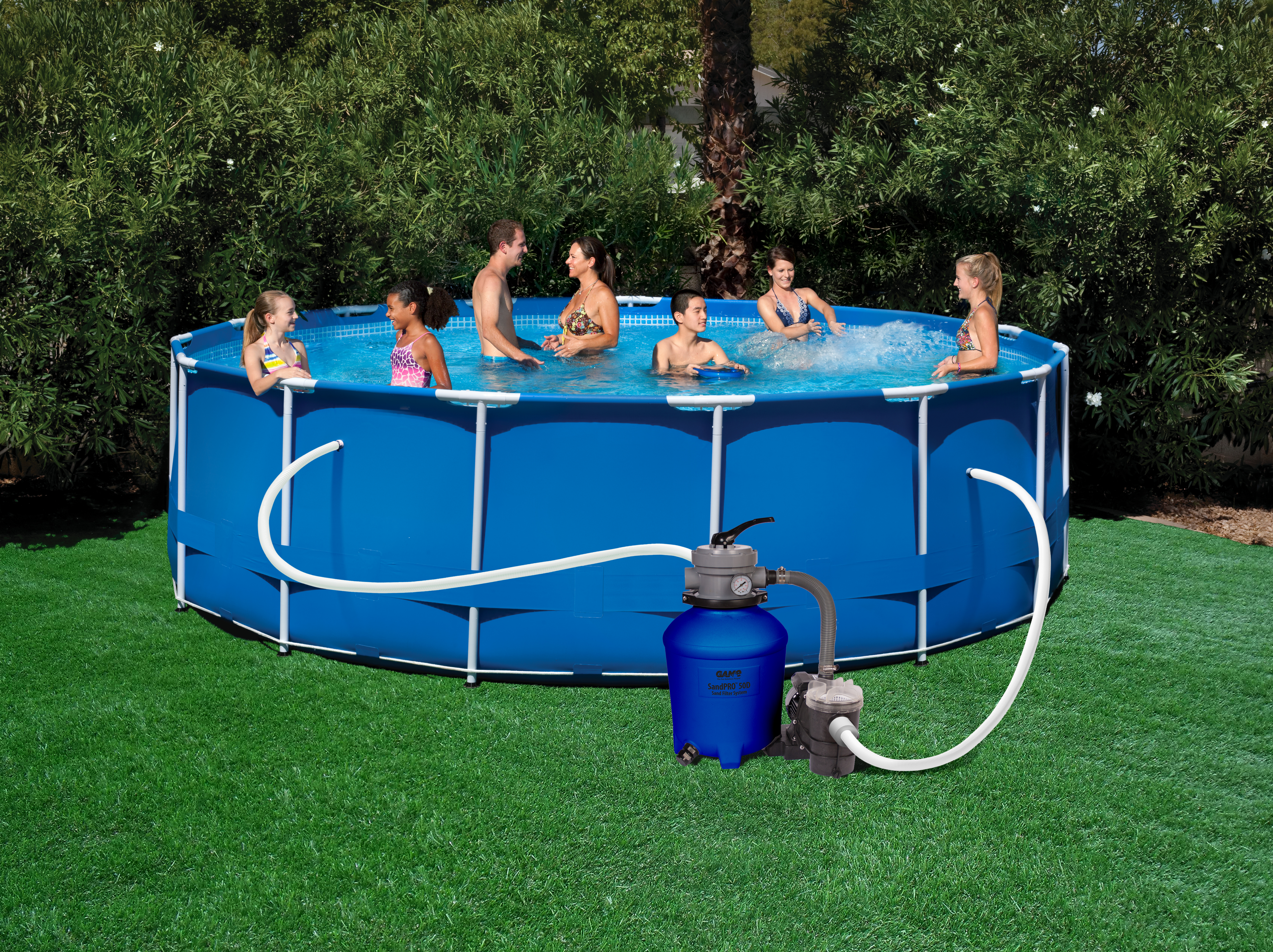
Sand filtration system

A pressure-fed sand filter is typically placed in line immediately after the water pump. The filter typically contains a medium such as graded sand (called '14/24 Filter Media' in the UK system of grading the size of sand by sifting through a fine brass-wire mesh of 14 to the inch (5.5 per centimeter) to 24 to the inch (9.5 per cm)). A pressure fed sand filter is termed a 'High Rate' sand filter, and will generally filter turbid water of particulates no less than 10 micrometers in size. The rapid sand filter type are periodically 'back washed' as contaminants reduce water flow and increase back pressure. Indicated by a pressure gauge on the pressure side of the filter reaching into the 'red line' area, the pool owner is alerted to the need to 'backwash' the unit. The sand in the filter will typically last five to seven years before all the grains' rough edges are worn off into smoother, more spherical grains, and the fine-sized debris buildup more tightly fills the gaps between sand particles until the filter no longer works as intended due to lessened water-flow rates. Recommended filtration for public/commercial pools is 1 ton sand per 100,000 liters water (10 ounces avdp. per cubic foot of water) [7.48 US or 6.23 UK gallons].

Introduced in the early 1900s was another type of sand filter – the 'Rapid Sand' filter, whereby water was pumped into the top of a large volume tank (3' 0" or more cube) (1 cubic yard/200US gal/170UK gal/770 liters) containing filter grade sand and returning to the pool through a pipe at the bottom of the tank. As there is no pressure inside this tank, they were also known as "gravity filters". These types of filters are not greatly effective, and are no longer common in home swimming pools, being replaced by the pressure-fed type filter.

==== Diatomaceous earth ====
Some filters use diatomaceous earth to help filter out contaminants. Commonly referred to as DE filters, they exhibit superior filtration capabilities. A DE filter will often trap waterborne contaminants as small as 1 micrometer. DE filters are banned in some states, as they must be emptied out periodically and the contaminated media flushed down the sewer, causing a problem in some districts' sewage systems.

As of 2020, several companies produced regenerative media filters, sometimes called precoat media filters, which use perlite as the filtration media rather than diatomaceous earth. As of 2021, perlite could safely be flushed down the sewer, and was approved and NSF listed for use in the United States.

==== Cartridge filters ====
Other filter media that have been introduced to the residential swimming pool market since 1970 include sand particles and paper type cartridge filters of 50 to 150 square feet (4.6 to 13.9 m^{2}) filter area arranged in a tightly packed 12" diameter x 24" long (300 mm x 600 mm) accordion-like circular cartridge. These units can be 'daisy-chained' together to collectively filter almost any size home pool. The cartridges are typically cleaned by removal from the filter body and hosing-off down a sewer connection. They are popular where backwashed water from a sand filter is not allowed to be discharged or go into the aquifer.

Fabric Filters

Traditional pool filters vary in the micron particle sizes that they can capture. Fabric filters can capture particles smaller than that of standard swimming pool filtration systems. This type of filter connects where the water return to the pool after passing through a standard filter. They are usually in the form of a bag. With filtration levels as small as 1 micrometer, users can attain much cleaner water, when using a sand of cartridge filter. These levels are equal or better than that of a diatomaceous earth filter.

==== Automated pool cleaners ====
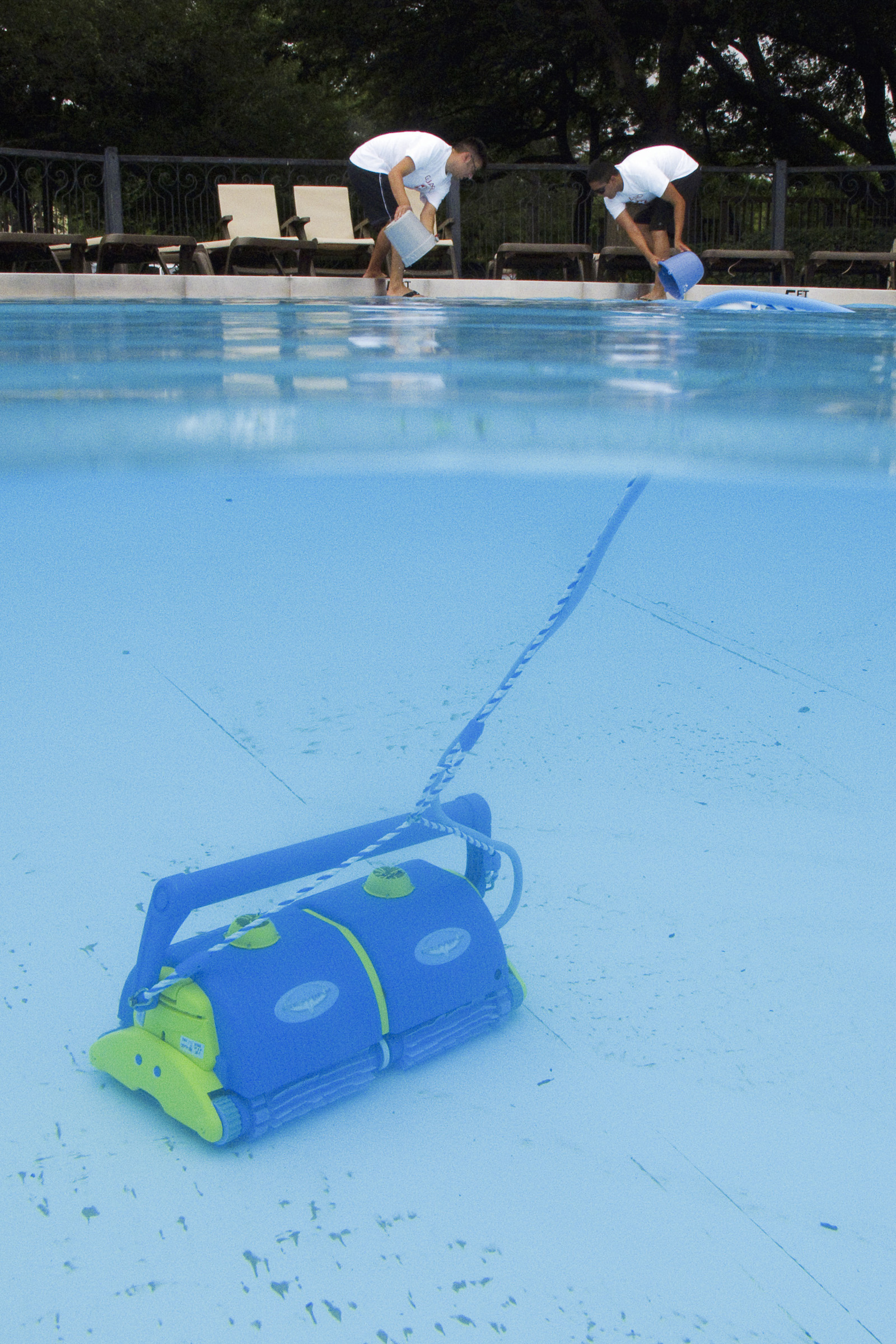
Automated pool cleaner

Automated pool cleaners, also known as "automatic pool cleaners", and in particular electric, robotic pool cleaners provide an extra measure of filtration. Like handheld vacuums, they can microfilter a pool, which a sand filter without flocculation or coagulants cannot.

These cleaners are independent from the pool's main filter and pump system, and are powered by a separate electricity source, usually in the form of a set-down transformer that is kept at least 10 feet (3.0 m) from the water in the pool, often on the pool deck. They have two internal motors: one to suck in water through a self-contained filter bag and then return the filtered water at a high speed back into the pool water, and one that is a drive motor connected to tractor-like rubber or synthetic tracks and "brushes" connected by rubber or plastic bands via a metal shaft. The brushes, resembling paint rollers, are located on the front and back of the machine, and help to remove contaminating particles from the pool's floor, walls, and, in some designs, even the pool steps (depending on size and configuration). They also direct the particles into the internal filter bag.

==== Other systems ====
Saline chlorination units, electronic oxidation systems, ionization systems, microbe disinfection with ultra-violet lamp systems, and "tri-chlor feeders" are other independent or auxiliary systems for swimming pool sanitation.

==== Consecutive dilution ====
A consecutive dilution system is arranged to remove organic waste in stages after it passes through the skimmer. Waste matter is trapped inside one or more sequential skimmer basket sieves, each having a finer mesh to further dilute contaminant size. Dilution here is defined as the action of making something weaker in force, content, or value.

The first basket is placed closely after the skimmer mouth. The second is attached to the circulation pump. Here the 25% of water drawn from the main drain at the bottom of the swimming pool meets the 75% drawn from the surface. The circulation pump sieve basket is easily accessible for service and is to be emptied daily. The third sieve is the sand unit. Here smaller organic waste that has slipped through the previous sieves is trapped by sand.

If not removed regularly, organic waste will continue to rot down and affect water quality. The dilution process allows organic waste to be easily removed. Ultimately the sand sieve can be backwashed to remove smaller trapped organic waste which otherwise leaches ammonia and other compounds into the recirculated water. These additional solutes eventually lead to the formation of disinfection by-products (DBPs). The sieve baskets are easily removed daily for cleaning as is the sand unit, which should be back-washed at least once a week. A perfectly maintained consecutive dilution system drastically reduces the build-up of chloramines and other DBPs. The water returned to the pool should have been cleared of all organic waste above 10 microns in size.

==== Mineral sanitizers ====
Mineral sanitizers for the swimming pool and spa use minerals, metals, or elements derived from the natural environment to produce water quality benefits that would otherwise be produced by harsh or synthetic chemicals.

Companies are not allowed to sell a mineral sanitizer in the United States unless it has been registered with the Environmental Protection Agency (EPA). Currently, two mineral sanitizers are registered with the EPA: one is a silver salt with a controlled release mechanism which is applied to calcium carbonate granules that help neutralize pH; the other uses a colloidal form of silver released into water from ceramic beads.

Mineral technology takes advantage of the cleansing and filtering qualities of commonly occurring substances. Silver and copper are well-known oligodynamic substances that are effective in destroying pathogens. Silver has been shown to be effective against harmful bacteria, viruses, protozoa and fungi. Copper is widely used as an algicide. Alumina, derived from aluminates, filters detrimental materials at the molecular level and can be used to control the delivery rate of desirable metals such as copper. Working through the pool or spa filtration system, mineral sanitizers use combinations of these minerals to inhibit algae growth and eliminate contaminants.

Unlike chlorine or bromine, metals and minerals do not evaporate and do not degrade. Minerals can make the water noticeably softer, and by replacing harsh chemicals in the water they lower the potential for red-eye, dry skin and foul odors.

=== Skimmers ===
==== Coping apertures ====
Water is typically drawn from the pool via a rectangular aperture in the wall, connected through to a device fitted into one (or more) wall/s of the pool. The internals of the skimmer are accessed from the pool deck through a circular or rectangle lid, about one foot in diameter. If the pool's water pump is operational water is drawn from the pool over a floating hinged weir (operating from a vertical position to a 90-degree angle away from the pool, in order to stop leaves and debris being back-flooded into the pool by wave action), and down into a removable "skimmer basket", the purpose of which is to entrap leaves, dead insects and other larger floating debris.

The aperture visible from the pool side is typically 1' 0" (300 mm) wide by 6" (150 mm) high, which intersects the water midway through the center of the aperture. Skimmers with apertures wider than this are termed "wide angle" skimmers and may be as much as 2' 0" wide (600 mm). Floating skimmers have the advantage of not being affected by the level of the water as these are adjusted to work with the rate of pump suction and will retain optimum skimming regardless of water level leading to a markedly reduced amount of bio-material in the water. Skimmers should always have a leaf basket or filter between it and the pump to avoid blockages in the pipes leading to the pump and filter.

Prior to the mid-1970s most skimmers were either made of metal like copper or stainless steel either a large round or square shape. Built in concrete pour skimmers were also common on concrete pools before the introduction of PVC Skimmers in the late 1960s

=== Pool re-circulation ===
Water returning from the consecutive dilution system is passed through return jets below the surface. These are designed to impact a turbulent flow as the water enters the pool. This flow as a force is far less than the mass of water in the pool and takes the least pressure route upward where eventually surface tension reforms it into a laminar flow on the surface.

As the returned water disturbs the surface, it creates a capillary wave. If the return jets are positioned correctly, this wave creates a circular motion within the surface tension of the water, allowing that on the surface to slowly circulate around the pool walls. Organic waste floating on the surface through this circulation from the capillary wave is slowly drawn past the mouth of the skimmer where it is pulled in due to the laminar flow and surface tension over the skimmer weir. In a well-designed pool, circulation caused by the disturbed returned water aids in removing organic waste from the pool surface, directing it to be trapped inside the consecutive dilution system for easy disposal.

Many return jets are equipped with a swivel nozzle. Used correctly, it induces deeper circulation, further cleaning the water. Turning the jet nozzles at an angle imparts rotation within the entire depth of pool water. Orientation to the left or right would generate clockwise or anti-clockwise rotation respectively. This has the benefit of cleaning the bottom of the pool and slowly moving sunken inorganic debris to the main drain where it is removed by the circulation pump basket sieve.

In a correctly constructed pool, rotation of the water caused by the manner it is returned from the consecutive dilution system will reduce or even waive the need to vacuum the bottom. To gain the maximum rotation force on the main body of water, the consecutive dilution system needs to be as clean and unblocked as possible to allow maximum flow pressure from the pump. As the water rotates, it also disturbs organic waste at lower water layers, forcing it to the top. Rotational force the pool return jets create is the most important part of cleaning the pool water and pushing organic waste across the mouth of the skimmer.

With a correctly designed and operated swimming pool, this circulation is visible and after a period of time, reaches even the deep end, inducing a low-velocity vortex above the main drain due to suction. Correct use of the return jets is the most effective way of removing disinfection by-products caused by deeper decomposing organic waste and drawing it into the consecutive dilution system for immediate disposal.

==== Heaters ====
Another piece of equipment that may be optioned in the recirculation system is a pool water heater. They can be heat pumps, natural gas or propane gas heaters, electric heaters, wood-burning heaters, or solar hot water panel heaters – increasingly used in the sustainable design of pools.

==== Other equipment ====
Diversions to electronic oxidation systems, ionization systems, microbe disinfection with ultra-violet lamp systems, and "Tri-Chlor Feeders" are other auxiliary systems for swimming pool sanitation - as well as solar panels - and are in most cases required to be placed after the filtration equipment, often the last items being placed before the water is returned to the pool.

== Other features ==
=== Recreation amenities ===
Features that are part of the water circulation system can extend treatment capacity needs for sizing calculations and can include: artificial streams and waterfalls, in-pool fountains, integrated hot tubs and spas, water slides and sluices, artificial "pebble beaches", submerged seating as bench-ledges or as "stools" at in-pool bars, plunge pools, and shallow children's wading pools.

== See also ==
- Automated pool cleaners
- Copper ion swimming pool system
- Fountain
- Natural swimming pool
- Reflecting pool
- Respiratory risks of indoor swimming pools
- Water purification
