= Haloacetic acid =

Class of chemical compounds

Bromoacetic acid

Trichloroacetic acid

Examples of haloacetic acids

Haloacetic acids or HAAs are carboxylic acids in which one or more halogen atoms take the place of hydrogen atoms in the methyl group of acetic acid. In a monohaloacetic acid, a single halogen replaces a hydrogen atom: for example, in bromoacetic acid. Further substitution of hydrogen atoms with halogens can occur, as in dichloroacetic acid and trichloroacetic acid.

Haloacetic acids are a common contaminant in treated drinking water, particularly water subjected to chlorination.

== Contaminants in treated water ==
Haloacetic acids (HAAs) are a common undesirable by-product of water treatment by chlorination. Exposure to such disinfection by-products in drinking water, at high levels over many years, has been associated with a number of health outcomes by epidemiological studies.

HAAs can be formed following chlorination, ozonation, or chloramination of water, as chlorine from the water disinfection process can react with organic matter and small amounts of bromide present in water. HAAs are highly chemically stable, and therefore persist in water after formation.

A study published in August 2006 found that total levels of HAAs in drinking water were not affected by storage or boiling, but that filtration was effective in decreasing levels.

=== HAA5 ===
In the United States, the EPA regulates the five HAAs most commonly found in drinking water, collectively referred to as "HAA5." These are:

- Chloroacetic acid (MCA) (ClCH_{2}−CO_{2}H)
- Dichloroacetic acid (DCA) (Cl_{2}CH−CO_{2}H)
- Trichloroacetic acid (TCA) (Cl_{3}C−CO_{2}H)
- Bromoacetic acid (BrCH_{2}−CO_{2}H)
- Dibromoacetic acid (Br_{2}CH−CO_{2}H)

The regulation limit for these five acids combined is 60 parts per billion (ppb). The sum of bromodichloroacetic acid, dibromochloroacetic acid and tribromoacetic acid concentrations is known as HAA3.

=== HAA9 ===
The designation "HAA9" refers to a larger group of HAAs, including all of the acids in HAA5, along with:

- Bromochloroacetic acid (ClBrCH−CO_{2}H)
- Bromodichloroacetic acid (Cl_{2}BrC−CO_{2}H)
- Dibromochloroacetic acid (ClBr_{2}C−CO_{2}H)
- Tribromoacetic acid (Br_{3}C−CO_{2}H)

The level of these four acids in drinking water is not regulated by the EPA. HAA6 refers to the sum of HAA5 and bromochloroacetic acid concentrations.

== Health effects ==
Haloacetic acids are readily absorbed by the human body after being ingested, and can be absorbed slightly through the skin. At high concentrations, HAAs have irritating and corrosive properties; however, typical concentrations of HAAs found in drinking water are extremely low. HAAs are typically eliminated from the body through normal processes between 1 day and 2 weeks after ingestion, depending on the type of acid.

Highly concentrated HAAs have been found to cause toxicity in various organs, including the liver and pancreas, in animal studies. This includes an increased risk of cancer, particularly of the liver and bladder. For this reason, the EPA considers a few HAAs (namely DCA and TCA) as potential human carcinogens. They may also cause developmental and reproductive problems during pregnancy. However, short-term adverse health effects are unlikely after ingesting dilute quantities of HAAs, and the long-term low-level risks associated with drinking treated water with residual HAAs are much lower than the risks of drinking untreated water.

== Chemistry ==
Haloacetic acids have a general chemical formula X^{1}X^{2}X^{3}C−CO_{2}H, where X is hydrogen or halogen, and at least one X is a halogen.

The inductive effect caused by the electronegative halogens often results in the higher acidity of these compounds by stabilising the negative charge of the conjugate base.

== See also ==
- Fluoroacetic acid (FCH_{2}−CO_{2}H)
- Difluoroacetic acid (F_{2}CH−CO_{2}H)
- Trifluoroacetic acid (F_{3}C−CO_{2}H)
- Iodoacetic acid (ICH_{2}−CO_{2}H)
- Diiodoacetic acid (I_{2}CH−CO_{2}H)
- Triiodoacetic acid (I_{3}C−CO_{2}H)
- Bromodifluoroacetic acid (F_{2}BrCH−CO_{2}H)
