= Ethyl bromoacetate =

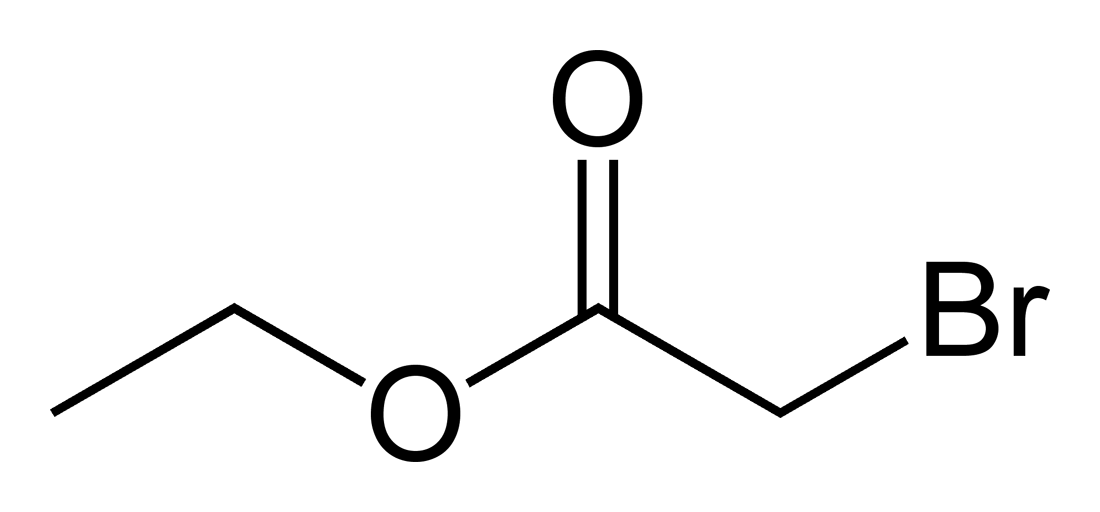
- Skeletal formula of ethyl bromoacetate

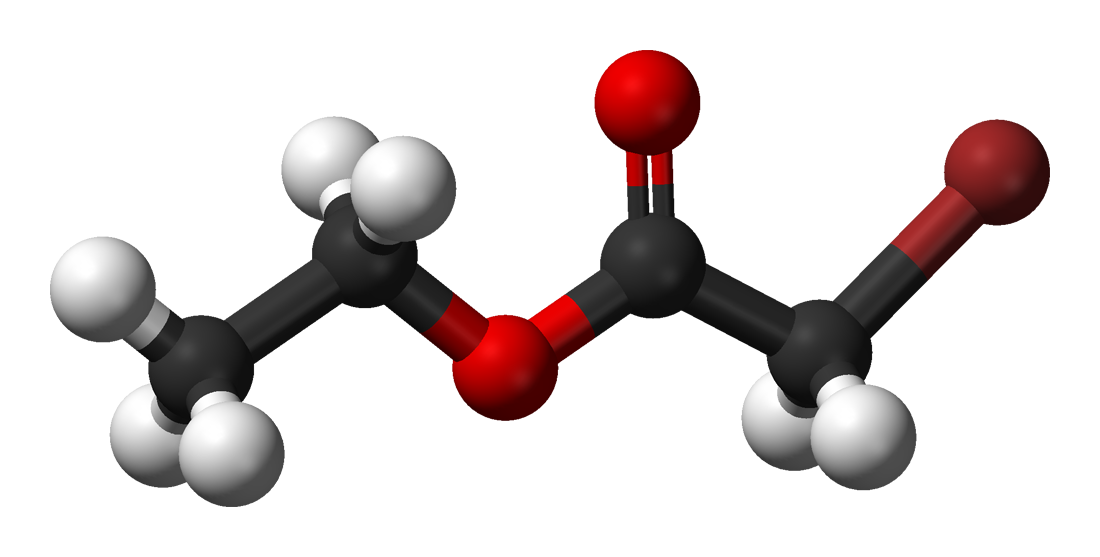
- Ball-and-stick model of ethyl bromoacetate

Names
- Preferred IUPAC name Ethyl bromoacetate
- Other names: Antol; Bromoacetic acid, ethyl ester; Ethoxycarbonylmethyl bromide; Ethyl 2-bromoacetate

Identifiers
CAS Number	105-36-2
3D model (JSmol)	Interactive image
ChEMBL	ChEMBL1085948
ChemSpider	7462
ECHA InfoCard	100.002.992
EC Number	203-290-9
PubChem CID	7748
RTECS number	AF6000000
UNII	D20KFB313W
UN number	1603
CompTox Dashboard (EPA)	DTXSID4020587
- InChI: InChI=1S/C4H7BrO2/c1-2-7-4(6)3-5/h2-3H2,1H3 Key: PQJJJMRNHATNKG-UHFFFAOYSA-N; InChI=1/C4H7BrO2/c1-2-7-4(6)3-5/h2-3H2,1H3 Key: PQJJJMRNHATNKG-UHFFFAOYAE
- SMILES: BrCC(=O)OCC

Properties
Chemical formula	BrCH_{2}CO_{2}CH_{2}CH_{3}
Molar mass	167.002 g·mol^{−1}
Appearance	Colorless to yellow liquid
Odor	Fruity, pungent
Density	1.51 g/cm^{3}
Melting point	−38 °C (−36 °F; 235 K)
Boiling point	158 °C (316 °F; 431 K)
Solubility in water	Insoluble
Magnetic susceptibility (χ)	−82.8·10^{−6} cm^{3}/mol

Hazards
- GHS labelling
Pictograms	(GHS06: Toxic)
Signal word	Danger
Hazard statements	H300, H310, H330
Precautionary statements	P260, P262, P264, P270, P271, P280, P284, P301+P310, P302+P350, P304+P340, P310, P320, P321, P330, P361, P363, P403+P233, P405, P501
NFPA 704 (fire diamond)	4 0 3
Flash point	47 °C (117 °F; 320 K)

Related compounds
Related esters	Methyl bromoacetate; Ethyl 3-bromopropionate; Ethyl chloroacetate; Ethyl iodoacetate; Ethyl bromodifluoroacetate; Ethyl acetoacetate
Related compounds	Bromoacetic acid; Pepper spray; Chloropicrin
- Except where otherwise noted, data are given for materials in their standard state (at 25 °C [77 °F], 100 kPa). verify (what is ?) Infobox references

Ethyl bromoacetate is the chemical compound with the formula BrCH_{2}CO_{2}CH_{2}CH_{3}. It is the ethyl ester of bromoacetic acid and is prepared in two steps from acetic acid. It is a lachrymator and has a fruity, pungent odor. It is also a highly toxic alkylating agent and may be fatal if inhaled.

== Applications ==
Ethyl bromoacetate is listed by the World Health Organization as a riot control agent, and was first employed for that purpose by French police in 1912. The French army used rifle grenades 'grenades lacrymogènes' filled with this gas against the Germans beginning in August 1914, but the weapons were largely ineffective, even though ethyl bromoacetate is twice as toxic as chlorine. (Note: The small quantities of gas delivered, roughly 19 cm^{3} per cartridge, were not even detected by the Germans. The stocks were rapidly consumed.[Why bromoacetate failed in WW1]) In the early months of the war the British also used the weaponized use of tear gas agents and more toxic gasses including sulfur dioxide. The German army then used these attacks to justify their subsequent employment of it as odorant or warning agent in odorless, toxic gases and chemical weapons in 1915 under the German code Weisskreuz (White Cross).

In organic synthesis, it is a versatile alkylating agent. Its major application involves the Reformatsky reaction, wherein it reacts with zinc to form a zinc enolate. The resulting BrZnCH_{2}CO_{2}CH_{2}CH_{3} condenses with carbonyl compounds to give a β-hydroxy-esters.

It is also the starting point for the preparation of several other reagents. For example, the related Wittig reagent (prepared by reaction with triphenylphosphine) is commonly used to prepare alpha,beta-unsaturated esters from carbonyl compounds such as benzaldehyde:

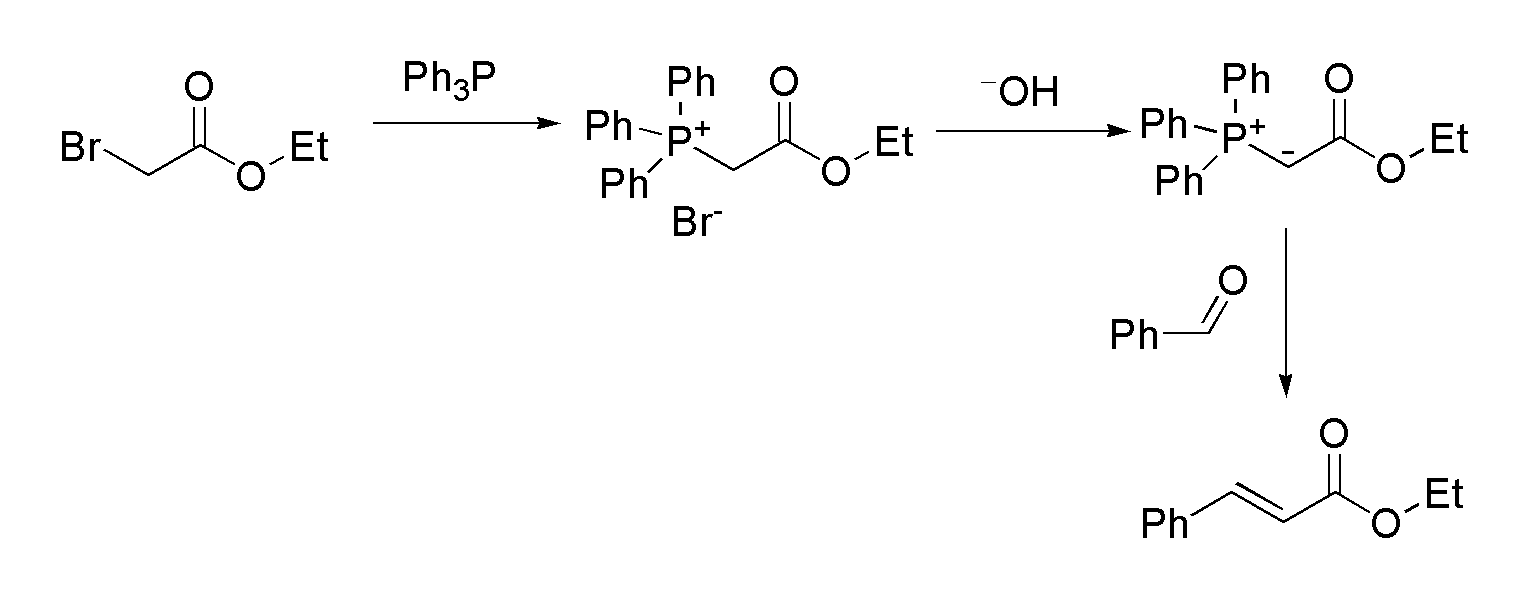
Ethyl bromoacetate as the starting point for a Wittig reaction sequence
