= Methyl 2-bromoacetate =

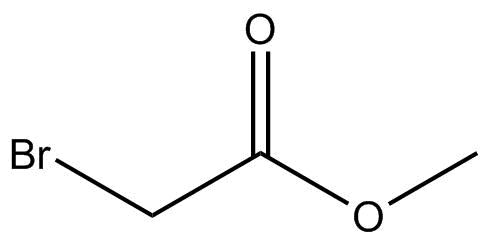

Names
- Preferred IUPAC name Methyl bromoacetate
- Other names Bromoacetic acid methyl ester, Methyl α-bromoacetate

Identifiers
CAS Number	96-32-2
3D model (JSmol)	Interactive image
ChemSpider	54945
ECHA InfoCard	100.002.273
EC Number	202-499-2
PubChem CID	24849708
UNII	LI6481MCM6
CompTox Dashboard (EPA)	DTXSID7052737
- InChI: InChI=1S/C3H5BrO2/c1-6-3(5)2-4/h2H2,1H3 Key: YDCHPLOFQATIDS-UHFFFAOYSA-N
- SMILES: COC(=O)CBr

Properties
Chemical formula	C_{3}H_{5}BrO_{2}
Molar mass	152.975 g·mol^{−1}
Density	1.6±0.1 g/cm^{3}
Boiling point	154 °C (309 °F; 427 K)
Solubility	Soluble in water

Hazards
- GHS labelling
Pictograms	(GHS05: Corrosive) (GHS06: Toxic) (GHS07: Exclamation mark)
Signal word	Warning
Hazard statements	H301, H311, H314, H335
Precautionary statements	P233, P260, P264, P270, P271, P280, P301, P302, P303, P304, P305, P310, P312, P321, P322, P330, P331, P338, P340, P351, P352, P353, P361, P363, P403, P405, P501
Flash point	63 °C (145 °F; 336 K)
- Except where otherwise noted, data are given for materials in their standard state (at 25 °C [77 °F], 100 kPa). Infobox references

Methyl 2-bromoacetate (methyl bromoactate) is a chemical compound with the molecular formula C_{3}H_{5}BrO_{2}.

== Properties ==
Methyl 2-bromoacetate is colorless or straw-colored liquid. The smell is sharp and penetrating. It is soluble in water and also has a higher density than water. It is incompatible with acids, bases, oxidizing agents, and reducing agents.

== Application ==
Methyl bromoacetate is an alkylating agent. It has been used to alkylate phenol and amino groups. Moreover, it can be used to make vitamins and pharmaceutical drugs. It is commonly used as a reagent in chemical modification of histidine. In addition, methyl bromoacetate also use in synthesize of coumarins and cis-cyclopropane. It reacts with conjugated base and produce alkylated carbene complexes.

== Safety ==
Methyl bromoacetate can be toxic by ingestion and inhalation. It can also irritate the skin and eyes as it is a lachrymator.

== See also ==
- Ethyl bromoacetate

== Extra reading ==
- Raju, B.; Murphy, E.; Levy, L. A.; Hall, R. D.; London, R. E. (1 March 1989). "A fluorescent indicator for measuring cytosolic free magnesium". American Journal of Physiology. Cell Physiology. 256 (3): C540–C548. doi:10.1152/ajpcell.1989.256.3.C540. PMID 2923192.
- Upper, Christen D.; West, Charles A. (July 1967). "Biosynthesis of Gibberellins". Journal of Biological Chemistry. 242 (14): 3285–3292. Bibcode:1967JBiCh.242.3285U. doi:10.1016/S0021-9258(18)95908-9.
- Davis, Franklin A.; Zhou, Ping; Reddy, G. Venkat (June 1994). "Asymmetric Synthesis and Reactions of cis-N-(p-Toluenesulfinyl)aziridine-2-carboxylic Acids". The Journal of Organic Chemistry. 59 (12): 3243–3245. doi:10.1021/jo00091a001.
- Henderson, Jaclyn L.; Edwards, Andrew S.; Greaney, Michael F. (June 2006). "Three-Component Coupling of Benzyne: Domino Intermolecular Carbopalladation". Journal of the American Chemical Society. 128 (23): 7426–7427. Bibcode:2006JAChS.128.7426H. doi:10.1021/ja0615526. PMID 16756281.
- Hannick, Steven M.; Kishi, Yoshito (October 1983). "An improved procedure for the Blaise reaction: a short, practical route to the key intermediates of the saxitoxin synthesis". The Journal of Organic Chemistry. 48 (21): 3833–3835. doi:10.1021/jo00169a053.
