= Tribromoacetic acid =

Names
- IUPAC name 2,2,2-tribromoacetic acid
- Other names: Tribromoacetic acid; Tribromoethanoic acid

Identifiers
CAS Number	75-96-7
3D model (JSmol)	Interactive image
ChEMBL	ChEMBL502627
ChemSpider	6175
ECHA InfoCard	100.000.837
EC Number	200-919-9
PubChem CID	6415
UNII	71KTL99QJX
CompTox Dashboard (EPA)	DTXSID6021668
- InChI: InChI=1S/C2HBr3O2/c3-2(4,5)1(6)7/h(H,6,7) Key: QIONYIKHPASLHO-UHFFFAOYSA-N
- SMILES: C(=O)(C(Br)(Br)Br)O

Properties
Chemical formula	C_{2}HBr_{3}O_{2}
Molar mass	296.740 g·mol^{−1}
Appearance	White crystalline powder
Odor	Pungent
Melting point	130 °C (266 °F; 403 K)
Boiling point	245 °C (473 °F; 518 K)
Solubility in water	Soluble

Hazards
- Occupational safety and health (OHS/OSH)
Main hazards	Highly toxic
- GHS labelling
Pictograms	(GHS05: Corrosive) (GHS06: Toxic) (GHS09: Environmental hazard)
Signal word	Danger
Hazard statements	H301, H311, H314, H317, H331, H400
Precautionary statements	P260, P264, P280, P301+P330+P331, P303+P361+P353, P304+P340, P305+P351+P338, P310, P321, P363, P405, P501
NFPA 704 (fire diamond)	3 0 0

Related compounds
Related compounds	Bromoacetic acid; Dibromoacetic acid; Trifluoroacetic acid; Trichloroacetic acid; Triiodoacetic acid
- Except where otherwise noted, data are given for materials in their standard state (at 25 °C [77 °F], 100 kPa). Infobox references

Tribromoacetic acid is the chemical compound with the formula CBr_{3}COOH. It is one of the haloacetic acids, but much less encountered and used than the closely related trichloroacetic and trifluoroacetic acids.

== Uses ==
Tribromoacetic acid is used as a catalyst for polymerization and as a brominating agent.

== See also ==
- Haloacetic acids
- Trifluoroacetic acid
- Trichloroacetic acid
