= Bromoacetic acid =

Skeletal formula of bromoacetic acid
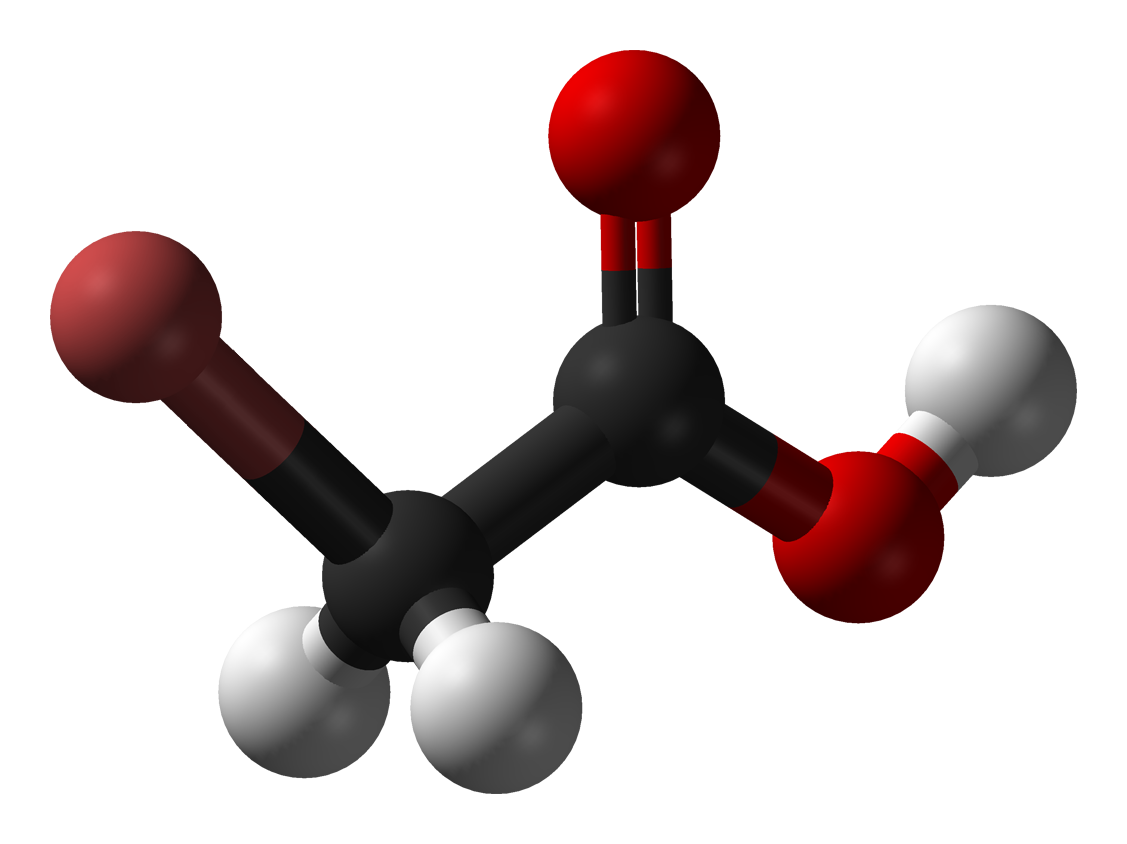
Ball-and-stick model

Names
- Preferred IUPAC name Bromoacetic acid
- Other names: 2-Bromoacetic acid; Bromoethanoic acid; α-Bromoacetic acid; Carboxymethyl bromide; Monobromoacetic acid; UN 1938

Identifiers
CAS Number	79-08-3
3D model (JSmol)	Interactive image; Interactive image
Beilstein Reference	506167
ChEBI	CHEBI:47264
ChEMBL	ChEMBL60851
ChemSpider	10301338
ECHA InfoCard	100.001.069
EC Number	201-175-8
PubChem CID	6227
RTECS number	AF5950000
UNII	2B3HS32431
CompTox Dashboard (EPA)	DTXSID7021495
- InChI: InChI=1S/C2H3BrO2/c3-1-2(4)5/h1H2,(H,4,5) Key: KDPAWGWELVVRCH-UHFFFAOYSA-N; InChI=1/C2H3BrO2/c3-1-2(4)5/h1H2,(H,4,5) Key: KDPAWGWELVVRCH-UHFFFAOYAM
- SMILES: C(C(=O)O)Br; BrCC(O)=O

Properties
Chemical formula	BrCH_{2}CO_{2}H
Molar mass	138.948 g·mol^{−1}
Appearance	White to light yellow crystalline solid
Density	1.934 g/mL
Melting point	49 to 51 °C (120 to 124 °F; 322 to 324 K)
Boiling point	206 to 208 °C (403 to 406 °F; 479 to 481 K)
Solubility	Polar organic solvents
Acidity (pK_{a})	2.86
Refractive index (n_{D})	1.4804 (50 °C, D)

Structure
Crystal structure	Hexagonal or orthorhombic

Hazards
- GHS labelling
Pictograms	(GHS05: Corrosive) (GHS06: Toxic) (GHS07: Exclamation mark) (GHS09: Environmental hazard)
Signal word	Danger
Hazard statements	H301, H311, H314, H317, H331, H400
Precautionary statements	P260, P264, P270, P271, P272, P273, P280, P301+P310, P301+P330+P331, P302+P352, P303+P361+P353, P304+P340, P305+P351+P338, P310, P311, P312, P321, P322, P330, P333+P313, P361, P363, P391, P403+P233, P405, P501
NFPA 704 (fire diamond)	3 1 0
Flash point	110 °C (230 °F; 383 K)

Related compounds
Related compounds	Acetic acid; Fluoroacetic acid; Chloroacetic acid; Iodoacetic acid; Tribromoacetic acid; Ethyl bromoacetate
- Except where otherwise noted, data are given for materials in their standard state (at 25 °C [77 °F], 100 kPa). Infobox references

Bromoacetic acid is a chemical compound with the formula BrCH_{2}CO_{2}H. This colorless solid is a relatively strong alkylating agent. Bromoacetic acid and its esters are widely used building blocks in organic synthesis, for example, in pharmaceutical chemistry.

The compound is prepared by bromination of acetic acid, such as by a Hell–Volhard–Zelinsky reaction or using other reagents.

CH_{3}CO_{2}H + Br_{2} → BrCH_{2}CO_{2}H + HBr
