= Iodoacetamide =

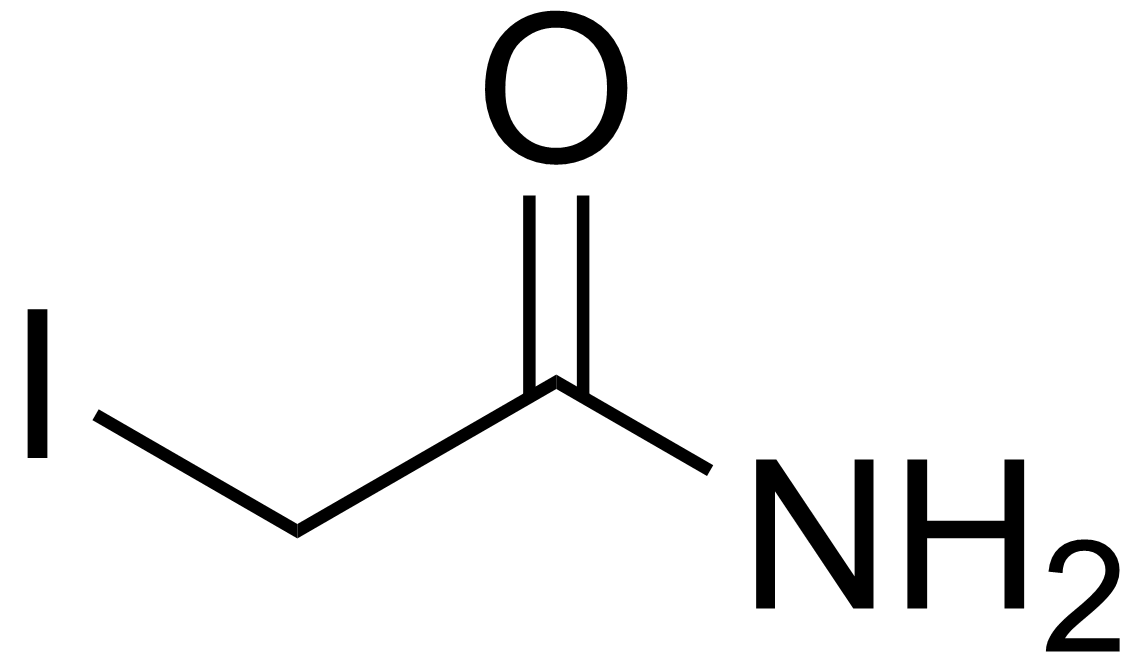
- Structural formula

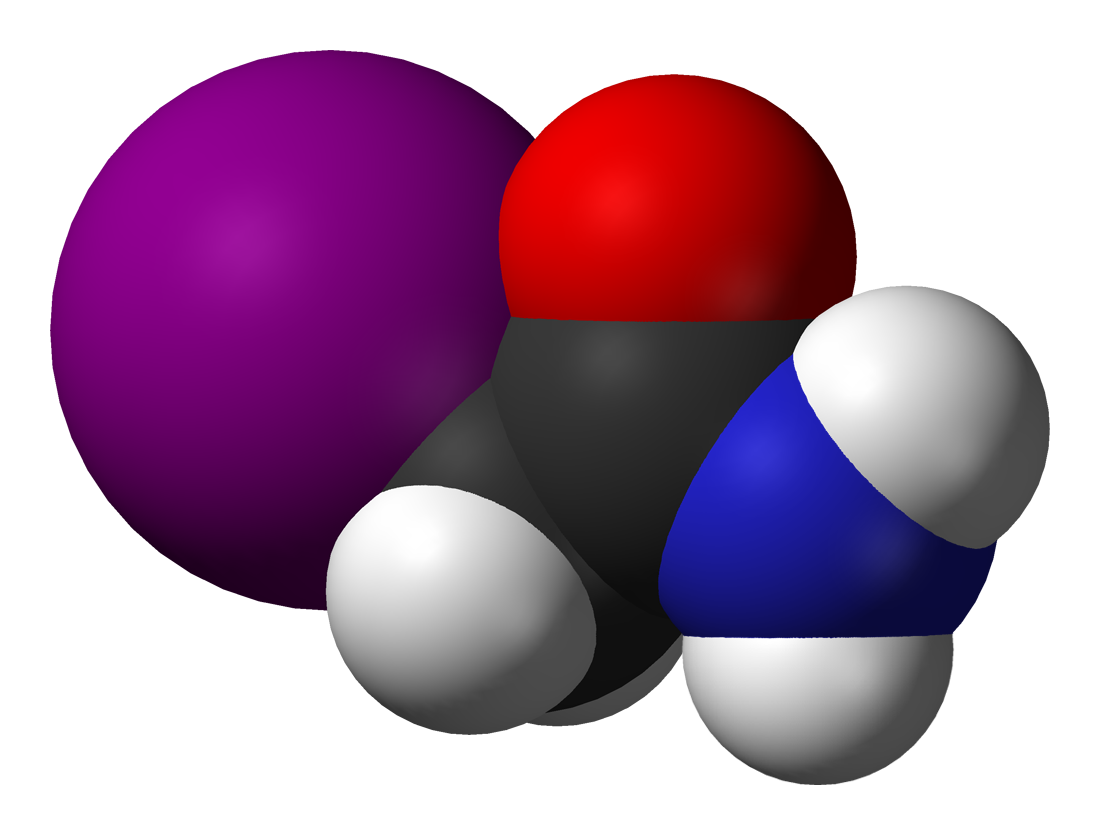
- Space-filling model

Names
- Preferred IUPAC name 2-Iodoacetamide
- Other names IAA

Identifiers
CAS Number	144-48-9
3D model (JSmol)	Interactive image
ChEMBL	ChEMBL276727
ChemSpider	3596
ECHA InfoCard	100.005.119
EC Number	205-630-1
IUPHAR/BPS	6271
PubChem CID	3727
RTECS number	AC4200000
UNII	ZRH8M27S79
CompTox Dashboard (EPA)	DTXSID9020742
- InChI: InChI=1S/C2H4INO/c3-1-2(4)5/h1H2,(H2,4,5) Key: PGLTVOMIXTUURA-UHFFFAOYSA-N; InChI=1/C2H4INO/c3-1-2(4)5/h1H2,(H2,4,5) Key: PGLTVOMIXTUURA-UHFFFAOYAE
- SMILES: C(C(=O)N)I

Properties
Chemical formula	C_{2}H_{4}INO
Molar mass	184.964 g·mol^{−1}
Appearance	white crystals (yellow colouration indicates the presence of iodine)
Melting point	94 °C (201 °F; 367 K)

Hazards
NFPA 704 (fire diamond)	3 0 1
Safety data sheet (SDS)	MSDS 1, MSDS 2

Related compounds
Related compounds	Acetamide; Fluoroacetamide; Chloroacetamide; Bromoacetamide; Iodoacetic acid
- Except where otherwise noted, data are given for materials in their standard state (at 25 °C [77 °F], 100 kPa). verify (what is ?) Infobox references

Iodoacetamide (IAA) is an organic compound with the chemical formula ICH_{2}CONH_{2}. It is an alkylating agent used for peptide mapping purposes in a process called carbamidomethylation. Its actions are similar to those of iodoacetate. It is commonly used to bind covalently with the thiol group of cysteine so the protein cannot form disulfide bonds. It is also used in ubiquitin studies as an inhibitor of deubiquitinase enzymes (DUBs) because it alkylates the cysteine residues at the DUB active site.

== Peptidase inhibitor ==
Iodoacetamide is an irreversible inhibitor of all cysteine peptidases, with the mechanism of inhibition occurring from alkylation of the catalytic cysteine residue (see schematic). In comparison with its acid derivative, iodoacetate, iodoacetamide reacts substantially faster. This observation appears contradictory to standard chemical reactivity, however the presence of a favourable interaction between the positive imidazolium ion of the catalytic histidine and the negatively charged carboxyl-group of the iodoacetate is the reason for the increased relative activity of iodoacetamide.

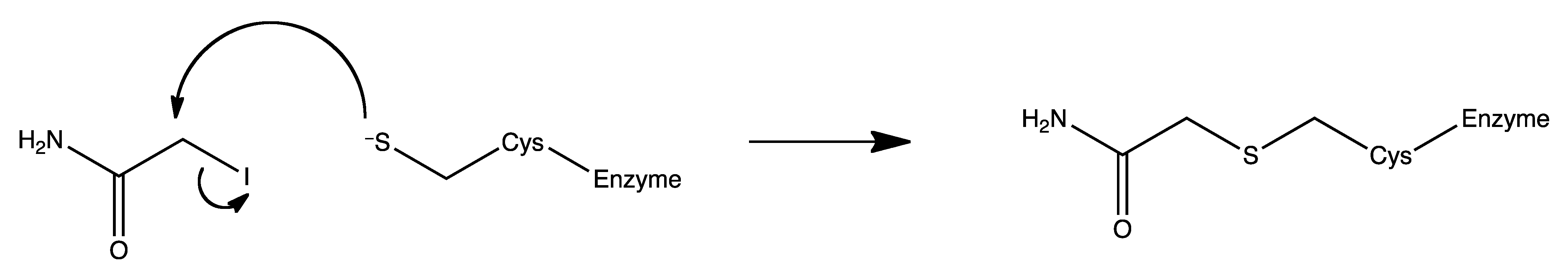
Mechanism of irreversible inhibition of cysteine peptidases with iodoacetamide.

== Protein mass spectrometry ==
It is commonly used during the sample preparation for de novo (peptide) sequencing with protein mass spectrometry, but recent critics suggest to avoid the use of it.
