= Water chlorination =

Chorination of water

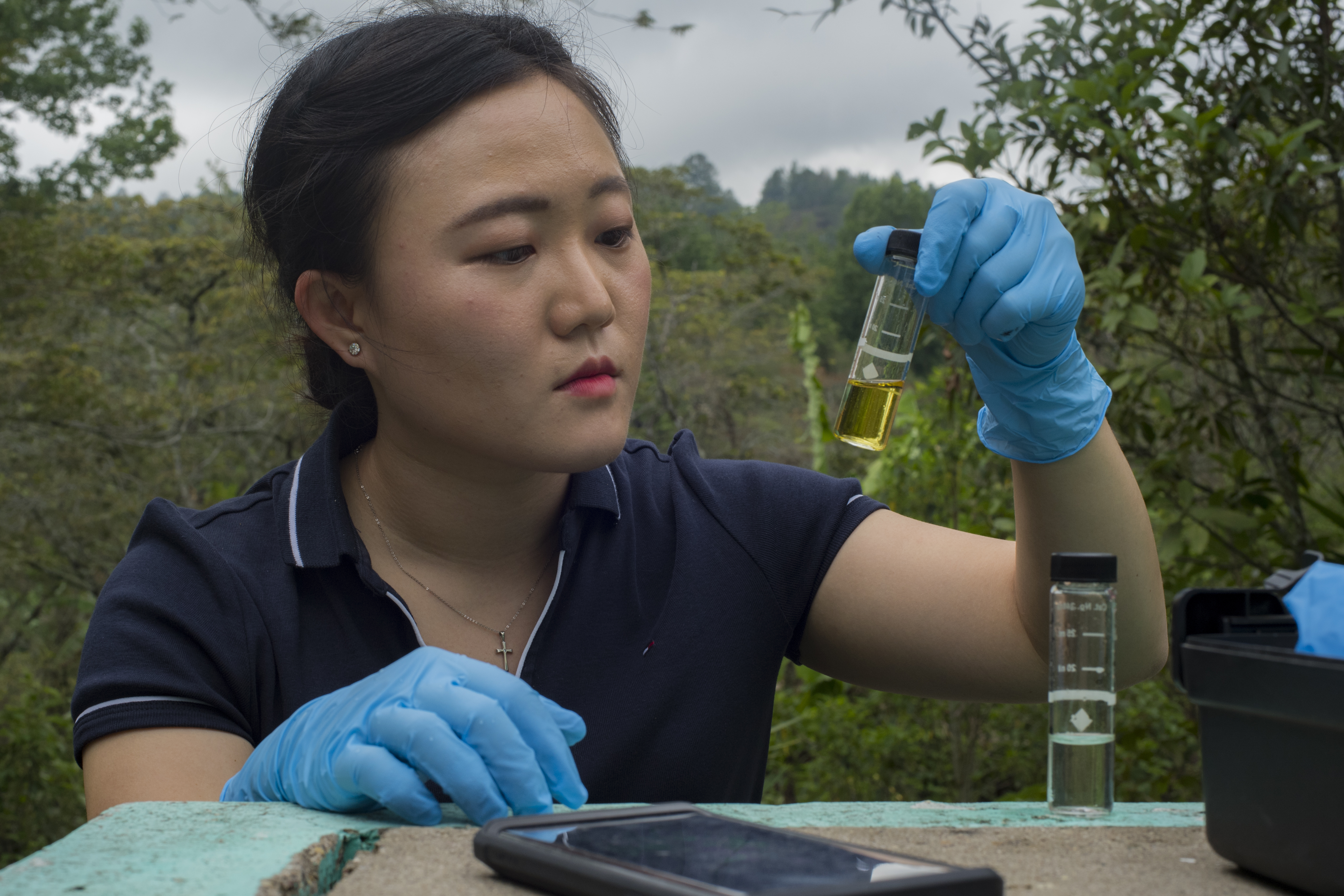
U.S. Army Spc. Young Wong Ham, Joint Task Force, performing a inspection of the chlorine levels of the local water source in La Paz, Honduras in May 2019

Water chlorination is the process of adding chlorine or chlorine compounds such as sodium hypochlorite to water. This method is used to kill bacteria, viruses and other microbes in water. In particular, chlorination is used to prevent the spread of waterborne diseases such as cholera, dysentery, and typhoid.

== History ==
In a paper published in 1894, it was formally proposed to add chlorine to water to render it "germ-free". Two other authorities endorsed this proposal and published it in many other papers in 1895. Early attempts at implementing water chlorination at a water treatment plant were made in 1893 in Hamburg, Germany. In 1897, the town of Maidstone, England, was the first to have its entire water supply treated with chlorine.

Permanent water chlorination began in 1905, when a faulty slow sand filter and a contaminated water supply caused a serious typhoid fever epidemic in Lincoln, England. Alexander Cruickshank Houston used chlorination of the water to stop the epidemic. His installation fed a concentrated solution of so-called "chlorinated lime" (a mixture of calcium hypochlorite, calcium hydroxide and calcium chloride) to the water being treated. This was not simply modern calcium chloride, but contained chlorine gas dissolved in lime-water (dilute calcium hydroxide) to form calcium hypochlorite (chlorinated lime). The chlorination of the water supply helped stop the epidemic, and as a precaution, the chlorination was continued until 1911, when a new water supply was commissioned.

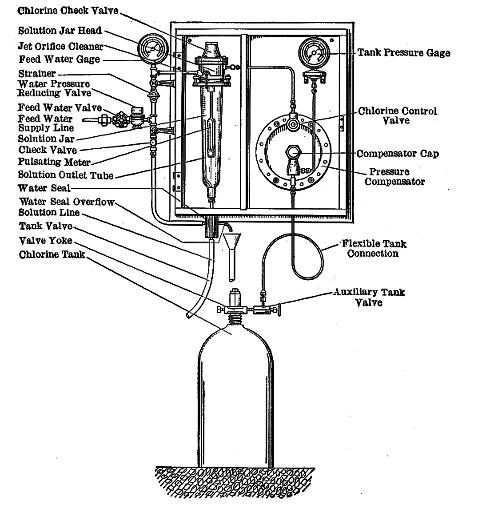
Manual Control Chlorinator for the liquefaction of chlorine for water purification, early 20th century. From Chlorination of Water by Joseph Race, 1918.

The first continuous use of chlorine in the United States for disinfection took place in 1908 at Boonton Reservoir (on the Rockaway River), which served as the supply for Jersey City, New Jersey. Chlorination was achieved by controlled additions of dilute solutions of chloride of lime (calcium hypochlorite) at doses of 0.2 to 0.35 ppm. The treatment process was conceived by John L. Leal, and the chlorination plant was designed by George Warren Fuller. Over the next few years, chlorine disinfection using chloride of lime (calcium hypochlorite) was rapidly implemented in drinking water systems around the world.

The technique of purification of drinking water by use of compressed liquefied chlorine gas was developed by a British officer in the Indian Medical Service, Vincent B. Nesfield, in 1903. According to his own account, "It occurred to me that chlorine gas might be found satisfactory ... if suitable means could be found for using it.... The next important question was how to render the gas portable. This might be accomplished in two ways: by liquefying it, and storing it in lead-lined iron vessels, having a jet with a very fine capillary canal, and fitted with a tap or a screw cap. The tap is turned on, and the cylinder placed in the amount of water required. The chlorine bubbles out, and in ten to fifteen minutes the water is absolutely safe. This method would be of use on a large scale, as for service water carts."

Major Carl Rogers Darnall, Professor of Chemistry at the Army Medical School, gave the first practical demonstration of this in 1910. This work became the basis for present day systems of municipal water purification. Shortly after Darnall's demonstration, Major William J. L. Lyster of the Army Medical Department used a solution of calcium hypochlorite in a linen bag to treat water.

For many decades, Lyster's method remained the standard for U.S. ground forces in the field and in camps, implemented in the form of the familiar Lyster Bag (also spelled Lister Bag). The canvas "bag, water, sterilizing" was a common component of field kitchens, issued one per 100 persons, of a standard 36-gallon capacity that hung from an often-improvised tripod in the field. In use from World War I through the Vietnam War, it has been replaced by reverse osmosis systems that produce potable water by pressure straining local water through microscopic-level filters: the Reverse Osmosis Water Purification Unit (1980) and the Tactical Water Purification System (2007) for large-scale production, and the Light Water Purifier unit for smaller-scale needs that includes ultrafiltration technology to produce potable water from any source and uses automated backwash cycles every 15 minutes to simplify cleaning operations.

Chlorine gas was first used on a continuing basis to disinfect the water supply at the Belmont filter plant, Philadelphia, Pennsylvania by using a machine invented by Charles Frederick Wallace who dubbed it the Chlorinator. It was manufactured by the Wallace & Tiernan company beginning in 1913. By 1941, disinfection of U.S. drinking water by chlorine gas had largely replaced the use of chloride of lime.

== Biochemistry ==
As a halogen, chlorine is a highly efficient disinfectant, and is added to public water supplies to kill disease-causing pathogens, such as bacteria, viruses, and protozoans, that commonly grow in water supply reservoirs, on the walls of water mains and in storage tanks. The microscopic agents of many diseases such as cholera, typhoid fever, and dysentery killed countless people annually before disinfection methods were employed routinely.

By far most chlorine is manufactured from table salt (NaCl) by electrolysis in the chlor-alkali process. The resulting gas at atmospheric pressures is liquified at high pressure. The liquefied gas is transported and used as such.

As a strong oxidizing agent, chlorine kills via the oxidation of organic molecules. Chlorine and the hydrolysis product hypochlorous acid are not charged and therefore easily penetrate the negatively charged surface of pathogens. It is able to disintegrate the lipids that compose the cell wall and react with intracellular enzymes and proteins, making them nonfunctional. Microorganisms then either die or are no longer able to multiply.

=== Principles ===
When dissolved in water, chlorine converts to an equilibrium mixture of chlorine, hypochlorous acid (HOCl), and hydrochloric acid (HCl):

Cl_{2} + H_{2}O ⇌ HOCl + HCl

In acidic solution, the major species are Cl_{2} and HOCl, whereas in alkaline solution, effectively only ClO^{−} (hypochlorite ion) is present. Very small concentrations of ClO_{2}^{−}, ClO_{3}^{−}, ClO_{4}^{−} are also found.

=== Shock chlorination ===
Shock chlorination is a process used in many swimming pools, water wells, springs, and other water sources to reduce the bacterial and algal residue in the water. Shock chlorination is performed by mixing a large amount of hypochlorite into the water. The hypochlorite can be in the form of a powder or a liquid such as chlorine bleach (solution of sodium hypochlorite or calcium hypochlorite in water). Water that is being shock chlorinated should not be swum in or drunk until the sodium hypochlorite count in the water goes down to three parts per million (ppm) or until the calcium hypochlorite count goes down to 0.2 to 0.35 ppm.

As an alternative to shock chlorination, some swimming pools are chlorinated by use of a chlorine-generating filter that electrolyzes common salt. Pools chlorinated by this method generally have lower levels of chlorine than directly chlorinated pools. Such pools are called saltwater pools.

== Drawbacks ==
Disinfection by chlorination can be problematic in some circumstances. Chlorine can react with naturally occurring organic compounds found in the water supply to produce compounds known as disinfection by-products (DBPs). The most common DBPs are trihalomethanes (THMs) and haloacetic acids (HAAs). Trihalomethanes are the primary disinfection by-products created from chlorination. In high doses, bromoform mainly slows down regular brain activity, which is manifested by symptoms such as sleepiness or sedation. Chronic exposure to both bromoform and dibromochloromethane can cause liver and kidney cancer, as well as heart disease, unconsciousness, or death in high doses. Due to the potential carcinogenicity of these compounds, drinking water regulations across the developed world require regular monitoring of the concentration of these compounds in the distribution systems of municipal water systems. The World Health Organization has stated that "the risks to health from these by-products are extremely small in comparison with the risks associated with inadequate disinfection".

There are also other concerns regarding chlorine, including its volatile nature which causes it to disappear too quickly from the water system, and concerns such as taste and odor.

== Dechlorinator ==
A dechlorinator is a chemical additive that removes chlorine or chloramine from water. Where tap water is chlorinated, it should be dechlorinated before use in an aquarium, since chlorine can harm aquatic life in the same way it kills micro-organisms. Chlorine will kill fish and cause damage to an aquarium's biological filter. Chemicals that serve this function are reducing agents which reduce chlorine species to chloride, which is harmless to life.

Some compounds employed in commercial dechlorinators are sodium thiosulfate, sodium hydroxymethanesulfonate, and sodium hydroxymethane sulfinic acid.

== See also ==
- Alternative methods for water disinfection
- Drinking water
- Safe Drinking Water Act
- Sodium dichloroisocyanurate, the chemical in chlorination tablets
- Sodium hypochlorite
- Sterilization (microbiology)
- Trichloroisocyanuric acid a.k.a. Symclosene, the chemical in chlorination tablets
- Water filter
- Water fluoridation
- Water industry
- Water pollution
- Water purification
- Water supply network
- Water treatment
