= Iodoacetic acid =

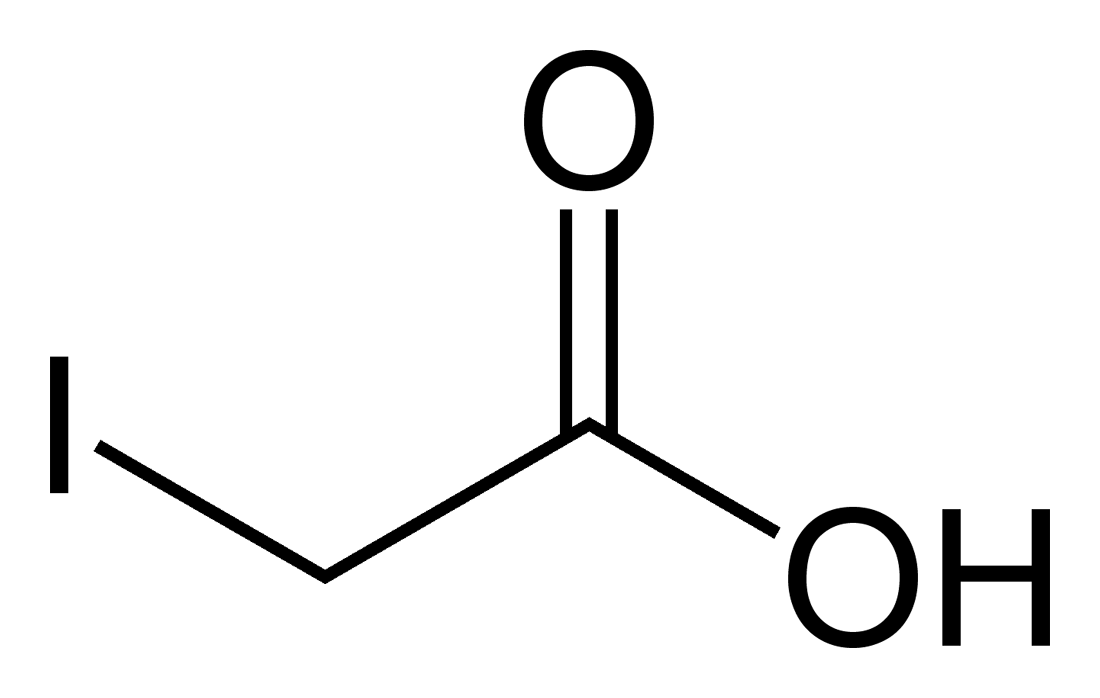
- Skeletal formula

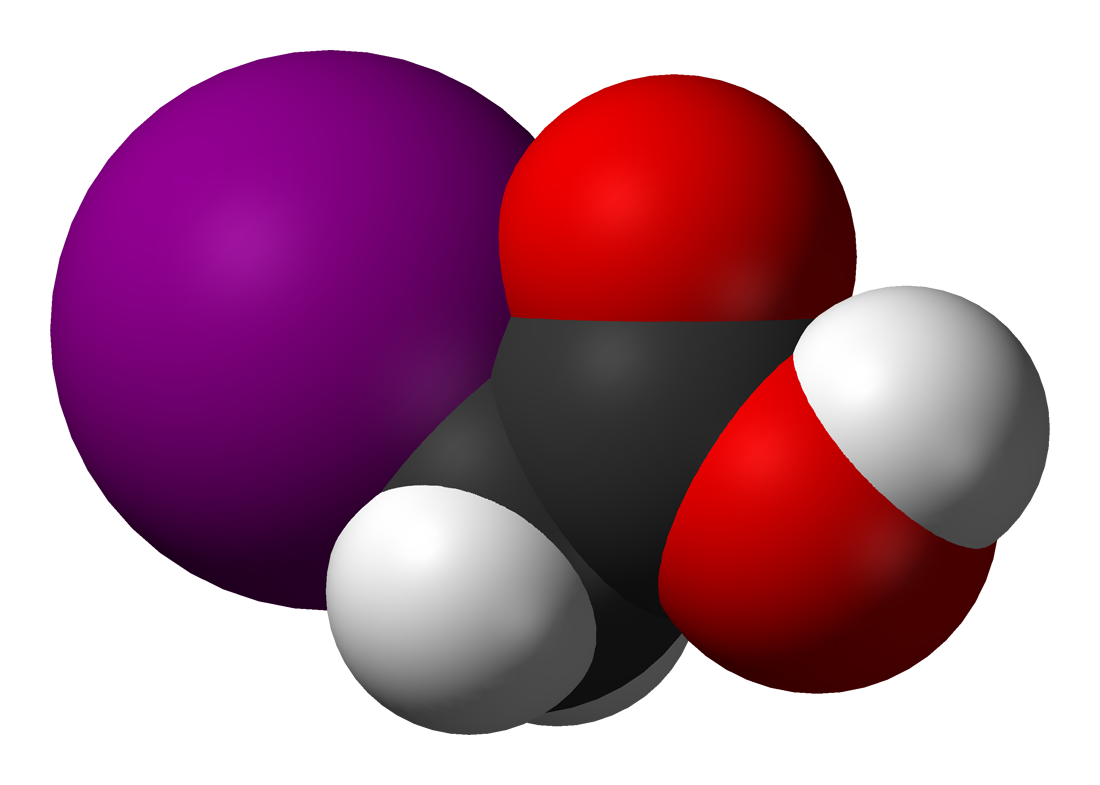
- Space-filling model Carbon, C Hydrogen Oxygen, O Iodine, I

Names
- Preferred IUPAC name Iodoacetic acid
- Other names 2-Iodoacetic acid

Identifiers
CAS Number	64-69-7
3D model (JSmol)	Interactive image
ChEBI	CHEBI:74571
ChEMBL	ChEMBL376280
ChemSpider	5050
ECHA InfoCard	100.000.537
PubChem CID	5240
UNII	WF5188V710
CompTox Dashboard (EPA)	DTXSID5025445
- InChI: InChI=1S/C2H3IO2/c3-1-2(4)5/h1H2,(H,4,5) Key: JDNTWHVOXJZDSN-UHFFFAOYSA-N; InChI=1/C2H3IO2/c3-1-2(4)5/h1H2,(H,4,5) Key: JDNTWHVOXJZDSN-UHFFFAOYAA
- SMILES: C(C(=O)O)I

Properties
Chemical formula	ICH_{2}CO_{2}H
Molar mass	185.948 g·mol^{−1}
Melting point	81 °C (178 °F; 354 K)
Boiling point	208 °C (406 °F; 481 K)
Acidity (pK_{a})	3.12

Hazards
- GHS labelling
Pictograms	(GHS06: Toxic) (GHS05: Corrosive)
Signal word	Danger
Hazard statements	H301, H314
Precautionary statements	P260, P280, P301+P310+P330, P303+P361+P353, P305+P351+P338, P310, P331
Safety data sheet (SDS)	Oxford MSDS

Related compounds
Related compounds	Acetic acid; Fluoroacetic acid; Chloroacetic acid; Bromoacetic acid; Tribromoacetic acidIodoacetamide; Ethyl bromoacetate
- Except where otherwise noted, data are given for materials in their standard state (at 25 °C [77 °F], 100 kPa). verify (what is ?) Infobox references

Iodoacetic acid is an organic compound with the chemical formula ICH_{2}CO_{2}H. It is a derivative of acetic acid. It is a toxic compound, because, like many alkyl halides, it is an alkylating agent.

It reacts with cysteine residues in proteins. It is often used to modify −SH groups to prevent the re-formation of disulfide bonds after the reduction of cystine residues to cysteine during protein sequencing.

In 1929, Dr. Einar Lundsgaard (1899–1968) discovered that muscle poisoned in vitro with iodoacetic acid is unable to produce lactate as glycolysis from muscle glycogen is blocked, causing the muscle to result in an electrically silent contracture. It was remembering this discovery, that led Dr. Brian McArdle in 1951, to speculate that one of his patients that had electromyographically silent muscle contractures brought on by high-intensity aerobic activity and anaerobic activity must have a defective muscle glycogen mechanism, leading to the description of McArdle's disease.

== Peptidase inhibitor ==
Iodoacetate is an irreversible inhibitor of all cysteine peptidases, with the mechanism of inhibition occurring from alkylation of the catalytic cysteine residue. In comparison with its amide derivative, iodoacetamide, iodoacetate reacts substantially more slowly. This observation appears contradictory to standard chemical reactivity, however, the presence of a favourable interaction between the positive imidazolium ion of the catalytic histidine and the negatively charged carboxyl group of the iodoacetic acid is the reason for the increased activity of iodoacetamide.

Mechanism of irreversible inhibition of cysteine peptidases with iodoacetate.

== Possible cancer therapy ==
Several studies have shown iodoacetate has anti-tumor effects. In 2002 Fawzia Fahim showed that "a single IAA treatment of tumor-bearing mice significantly increased the levels of plasma lactate dehydrogenase (LDH) activity, while it also significantly decreased the levels of plasma glucose and liver total protein, RNA and DNA, compared to normal controls." In 1975 Melvin S. Rhein, Joyce A. Filppi and Victor S. Moore showed that iodoacetate improved the immune response of bone marrow. In 1966 Charles A. Apffel, Barry G. Arnason & John H. Peters showed anti-tumor activity for iodoacetate.

== As a disinfection by-product ==
Iodide is a naturally occurring ion that can be found in many source waters and it is easily oxidized by wastewater disinfectants. One of the products of iodide oxidation is hypoiodous acid or hypoiodite (HOI and OI^{−} respectively) which are capable of reacting with background organic materials to generate iodinated disinfection by-products (DBPs) including iodoacetic acid. In a study performed by Plewa, et al., IAA was determined to be one of the most cytotoxic of those studied, with a median lethal dose on the order of magnitude of 10^{−5} M. It was the most genotoxic of more than 60 DBPs studied and is the most genotoxic DBP identified thus far. Iodoacetic acid has exhibited traits indicating it as a potential carcinogen, however, it has not been proven to be carcinogenic. The trend continues in teratogenicity, with iodoacetic acid's potency surpassing that of its brominated and chlorinated analogs. Its toxicity correlates to its ability as an alkylating agent, which will modify cysteine residues in proteins. Monohaloacetic acids are the most toxic, with toxicity increasing with halogen size. Iodoacetic acid is more toxic than bromoacetic acid and much more toxic than chloroacetic acid.
