= Ethyl 3-bromopropionate =

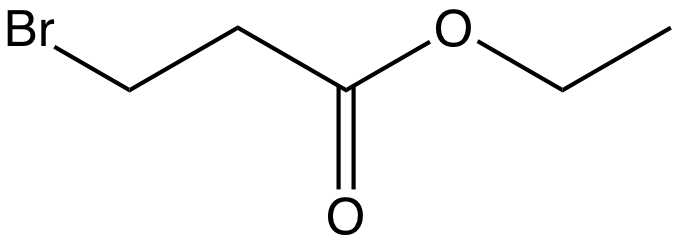

Names
- Preferred IUPAC name Ethyl 3-bromopropanoate
- Other names Ethyl β-Bromopropionate, Ethyl 2-bromopropanoate

Identifiers
CAS Number	539-74-2
3D model (JSmol)	Interactive image
ChemSpider	61615
EC Number	208-724-0
PubChem CID	68320
UNII	9B28G9S1JV
- InChI: InChI=1S/C5H9BrO2/c1-2-8-5(7)3-4-6/h2-4H2,1H3 Key: FQTIYMRSUOADDK-UHFFFAOYSA-N
- SMILES: CCOC(=O)CCBr

Properties
Chemical formula	C_{5}H_{9}BrO_{2}
Molar mass	181.029 g·mol^{−1}
Appearance	colorless liquid
Density	1.4409 g/cm^{3}
Boiling point	135–136 °C (275–277 °F; 408–409 K) 50 mmHg

Hazards
- GHS labelling
Pictograms	(GHS07: Exclamation mark)
Signal word	Warning
Hazard statements	H315, H319, H335
Precautionary statements	P261, P264, P271, P280, P302+P352, P304+P340, P305+P351+P338, P312, P321, P332+P313, P337+P313, P362, P403+P233, P405, P501
- Except where otherwise noted, data are given for materials in their standard state (at 25 °C [77 °F], 100 kPa). Infobox references

Ethyl 3-bromopropionate is the organobromine compound with the formula BrCH_{2}CH_{2}CO_{2}C_{2}H_{5}. It is a colorless liquid and an alkylating agent. It is prepared by the esterification of 3-bromopropionic acid. Alternatively, it can be prepared by hydrobromination of ethyl acrylate, a reaction that proceeds in an anti-Markovnikov sense.

== See also ==
- Ethyl bromoacetate
