= Ethyl bromodifluoroacetate =

Names
- IUPAC name Ethyl 2-bromo-2,2-difluoroacetate
- Systematic IUPAC name Ethyl 2,2-dibromo-2-fluoro-acetate
- Other names Difluorobromoacetic acid ethyl ester

Identifiers
| CAS Number | 667-27-6 |
| 3D model (JSmol) | Interactive image |
| ChemSpider | 62789 |
| ECHA InfoCard | 100.010.517 |
| EC Number | 211-567-0 |
| PubChem CID | 69585 |
| UNII | 2QFZ6JJ5YH |
| CompTox Dashboard (EPA) | DTXSID40216845 |
- InChI: InChI=1S/C4H5BrF2O2/c1-2-9-3(8)4(5,6)7/h2H2,1H3 Key: IRSJDVYTJUCXRV-UHFFFAOYSA-N; InChI=1/C4H5Br2FO2/c1-2-9-3(8)4(5,6)7/h2H2,1H3
- SMILES: BrC(Br)(F)C(=O)OCC

Properties
| Chemical formula | F_{2}BrCHCO_{2}CH_{2}CH_{3} |
| Molar mass | 202.983 g·mol^{−1} |
| Appearance | Colorless to slightly yellow liquid |
| Density | 1.583 g/mL |
| Boiling point | 82 °C (180 °F; 355 K) pressure is at 33 torr |
| Vapor pressure | 1.36 mmHg at 25°C |

Hazards
- GHS labelling
| Pictograms | (GHS05: Corrosive) (GHS07: Exclamation mark) |
| Signal word | Danger |
| Hazard statements | H225, H314 |
| Precautionary statements | P210, P233, P240, P241, P242, P243, P260, P264, P280, P301+P330+P331, P303+P361+P353, P304+P340, P305+P351+P338, P310, P321, P363, P370+P378, P403+P235, P405, P501 |
- Except where otherwise noted, data are given for materials in their standard state (at 25 °C [77 °F], 100 kPa). Infobox references

Ethyl bromodifluoroacetate is an ester with the chemical formula F_{2}BrCH−CO_{2}CH_{2}CH_{3}. It can be used to introduce the CF_{2} group when synthesising chemical compounds. It is a colorless to yellow liquid. It is an ethyl ester of bromodifluoroacetic acid.

== Formation ==
Ethyl fluorosulfonoxydifluoroacetate can react with sodium bromide (NaBr) to produce ethyl bromodifluoroacetate. And this reaction could happen in the solvent sulfolane. The reactions takes 12 hours at 100 °C with a yield of 31%.

== Reactions ==
Ethyl bromodifluoroacetate, and other similar compounds containing a CF_{2} units can be generated using the Reformatsky reagent with aldehydes and ketones. This yields 2,2-difluoro-3-hydroxy esters. Also ethyl bromdifluoroacetate is considered to be a good compound in generation of compounds and for testing with other organic compounds like lactones, imines and other amino acids.
