= Disinfection by-product =

Compounds resulting from chemical reactions during water disinfection

Disinfection by-products (DBPs) are organic and inorganic compounds resulting from chemical reactions between organic and inorganic substances such as contaminates and chemical treatment disinfection agents, respectively, in water during water disinfection processes.

== Chlorination disinfection byproducts ==
Chlorinated disinfection agents such as chlorine and monochloramine are strong oxidizing agents introduced into water in order to destroy pathogenic microbes, to oxidize taste/odor-forming compounds, and to form a disinfectant residual so water can reach the consumer tap safe from microbial contamination. These disinfectants may react with naturally present fulvic and humic acids, amino acids, and other natural organic matter, as well as iodide and bromide ions, to produce a range of DBPs such as the trihalomethanes (THMs), haloacetic acids (HAAs), bromate, and chlorite (which are regulated in the US), and so-called "emerging" DBPs such as halonitromethanes, haloacetonitriles, haloamides, halofuranones, iodo-acids such as iodoacetic acid, iodo-THMs (iodotrihalomethanes), nitrosamines, and others.

Chloramine has become a popular disinfectant in the US, and it has been found to produce N-nitrosodimethylamine (NDMA), which is a possible human carcinogen, as well as highly genotoxic iodinated DBPs, such as iodoacetic acid, when iodide is present in source waters.

Residual chlorine and other disinfectants may also react further within the distribution network – both by further reactions with dissolved natural organic matter and with biofilms present in the pipes. In addition to being highly influenced by the types of organic and inorganic matter in the source water, the different species and concentrations of DBPs vary according to the type of disinfectant used, the dose of disinfectant, the concentration of natural organic matter and bromide/iodide, the time since dosing (i.e. water age), temperature, and pH of the water.

Swimming pools using chlorine have been found to contain trihalomethanes, although generally they are below current EU standard for drinking water (100 micrograms per litre). Concentrations of trihalomethanes (mainly chloroform) of up to 0.43 ppm have been measured. In addition, trichloramine has been detected in the air above swimming pools, and it is suspected in the increased asthma observed in elite swimmers. Trichloramine is formed by the reaction of urea (from urine and sweat) with chlorine and gives the indoor swimming pool its distinctive odor.

== Byproducts from non-chlorinated disinfectants ==
Several powerful oxidizing agents are used in disinfecting and treating drinking water, and many of these also cause the formation of DBPs. Ozone, for example, produces ketones, carboxylic acids, and aldehydes, including formaldehyde. Bromide in source waters can be converted by ozone into bromate, a potent carcinogen that is regulated in the United States, as well as other brominated DBPs.

As regulations are tightened on established DBPs such as THMs and HAAs, drinking water treatment plants may switch to alternative disinfection methods. This change will alter the distribution of classes of DBPs.

== Occurrence ==
DBPs are present in most drinking water supplies that have been subject to chlorination, chloramination, ozonation, or treatment with chlorine dioxide. Many hundreds of DBPs exist in treated drinking water and at least 600 have been identified. The low levels of many of these DBPs, coupled with the analytical costs in testing water samples for them, means that in practice only a handful of DBPs are actually monitored. Increasingly it is recognized that the genotoxicities and cytotoxicities of many of the DBPs not subject to regulatory monitoring, (particularly iodinated, nitrogenous DBPs) are comparatively much higher than those DBPs commonly monitored in the developed world (THMs and HAAs).

In 2021, a new group of DBPs known as halogenated pyridinols was discovered, containing at least 8 previously unknown heterocyclic nitrogenous DBPs. They were found to require low pH treatments of 3.0 to be removed effectively. When their developmental and acute toxicity was tested on zebrafish embryos, it found to be slightly lower than those of halogenated benzoquinones, but dozens of times higher than of commonly known DBPs such as tribromomethane and iodoacetic acid.

== Health effects ==
Epidemiological studies have looked at the associations between exposure to DBPs in drinking water with cancers, adverse birth outcomes and birth defects. Meta-analyses and pooled analyses of these studies have demonstrated consistent associations for bladder cancer and for babies being born small for gestational age, but not for congenital anomalies (birth defects). Early-term miscarriages have also been reported in some studies. The exact putative agent remains unknown, however, in the epidemiological studies since the number of DBPs in a water sample are high and exposure surrogates such as monitoring data of a specific by-product (often total trihalomethanes) are used in lieu of more detailed exposure assessment. The World Health Organization has stated that "the risk of death from pathogens is at least 100 to 1000 times greater than the risk of cancer from disinfection by-products (DBPs)" {and} the "risk of illness from pathogens is at least 10 000 to 1 million times greater than the risk of cancer from DBPs". Simplistic toxicology-based methods used to estimate the potential cancer burden associated with DBPs have been criticised for overinflating the magnitude of the impacts, and the use of epidemiological data has been recommended in place of such approaches.

== Regulation and monitoring ==
The United States Environmental Protection Agency has set Maximum Contaminant Levels (MCLs) for bromate, chlorite, haloacetic acids and total trihalomethanes (TTHMs). In Europe, the level of TTHMs has been set at 100 micrograms per litre, and the level for bromate to 10 micrograms per litre, under the Drinking Water Directive. No guideline values have been set for HAAs in Europe. The World Health Organization has established guidelines for several DBPs, including bromate, bromodichloromethane, chlorate, chlorite, chloroacetic acid, chloroform, cyanogen chloride, dibromoacetonitrile, dibromochloromethane, dichloroacetic acid, dichloroacetonitrile, NDMA, and trichloroacetic acid.

== See also ==
- Stuart W. Krasner
