= Swimming pool service technician =

Person who maintains swimming pools

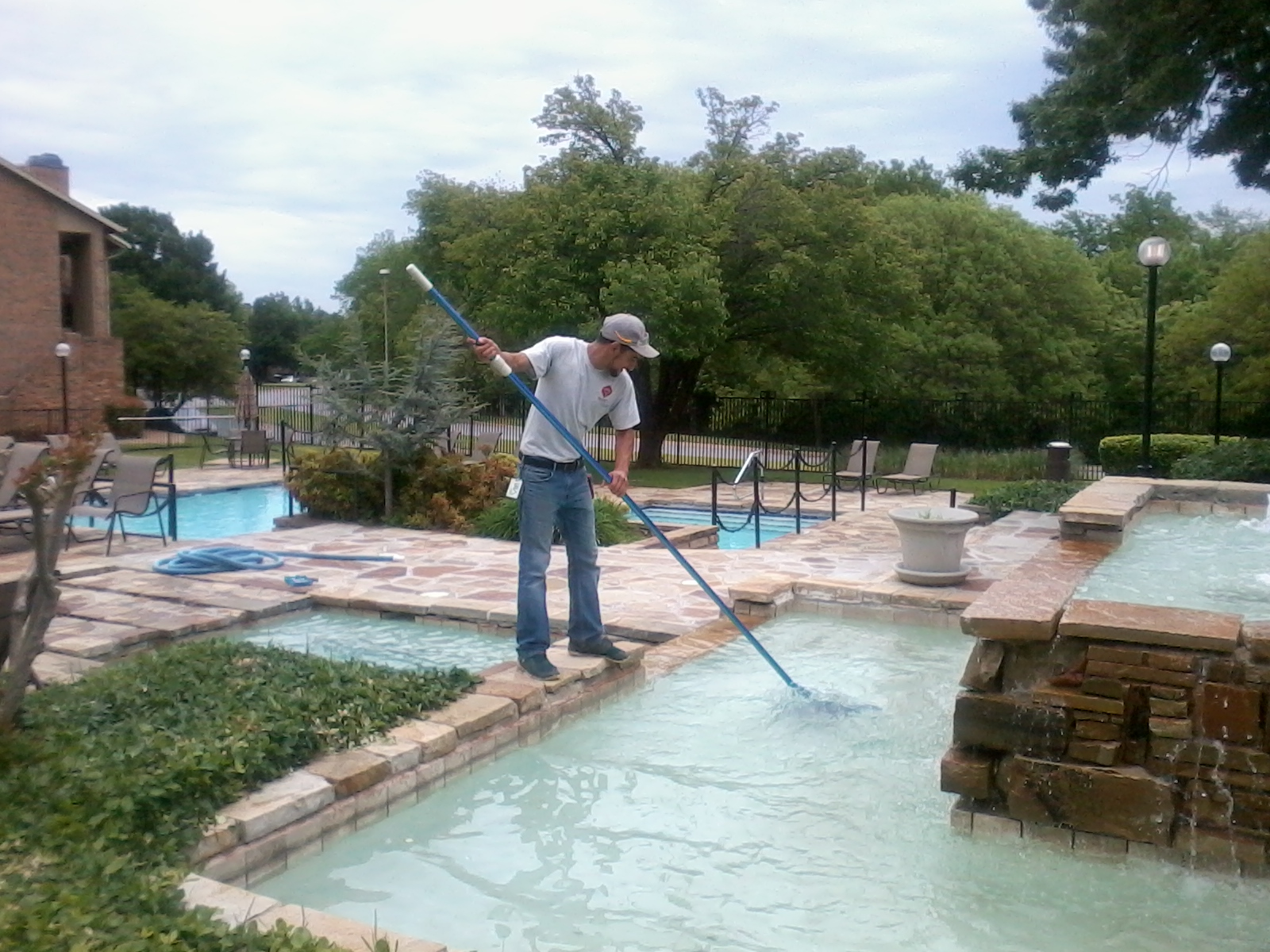
This swimming pool service technician is using a pool skimmer to remove debris from a courtyard fountain at an apartment complex in Tulsa, Oklahoma.

A swimming pool service technician is a person who maintains swimming pools, including keeping the water clean and safe by fixing pool equipment such as pumps, motors and water filters.

== Description ==
Pool and spa service technicians provide services in the swimming pool and spa industry. There are various national trade associations in the United States that offer memberships in these services, including the Pool & Hot Tub Alliance, the Independent Pool And Spa Service Association, Inc. and the United Pool Association. Certification can be obtained through various organizations, including the National Swimming Pool Foundation.

There are approximately 15 million residential pools and spas in the United States, and about 400,000 commercial and public swimming pools. The two service industry trade organizations boast of having about 15,000 members. These workers generally clean either residential or commercial swimming pools. Not all pool service professionals are members of these organizations, and many residential pool owners clean their own pools.

According to the National Swimming Pool Foundation, which has certified hundreds of thousands of pool service operators with its Certified Pool Operators course, only 26 states require that operators of public or commercial pools be properly trained and certified. The Centers for Disease Control and Prevention has published guidance to "help ensure healthy and safe experiences in public pools" in reports called the Model Aquatic Health Code.

An automated pool cleaner can also be used to clean some pools.

== Various roles ==
The swimming pool service technician industry has various jobs that extend beyond cleaning and sanitizing. Swimming pool service technicians are required to have an understanding of basic water chemistry readings, such as chlorine, pH, alkalinity, stabilizer, and salt levels. Additionally, they must have knowledge in maintaining and repairing pool and spa equipment, including filters, pumps, chlorinators, heaters, pool lights, and automation systems and are also responsible for maintaining safety by ensuring that diving boards, water slides, and other pool accessories are in safe working condition.

Another aspect of repairing or installing pool equipment is setting up automation systems. This includes running high and low voltage wires from a main breaker box to a separate automation panel where that electricity is then sent to the various pool equipment. Communication wire is also sent to the equipment to switch them on and off via the automation motherboard.

== Pay scale ==
The average swimming pool technician hourly pay rate in the United States is $17.30. This figure may vary depending on many factors, including the employer, location and worker's expertise.

== See also ==
- Swimming pool sanitation
- Automated pool cleaner
- Bather load
- Urine-indicator dye
