= NSPF =

NSPF may refer to:

- National Swimming Pool Foundation, a United States 501(c)(3) non-profit organization
- Norsk Speiderpikeforbund, a national jamboree in the Norwegian Guide and Scout Association
- No Single Point of Failure, a concept in systems engineering
