= Swimming pool cleaner =

Swimming pool cleaner refers to:

- Swimming pool sanitation
- Swimming pool service technician
