= WAHC =

WAHC may refer to:

- WJYD, a radio station (107.1 FM) licensed to serve Circleville, Ohio, United States, which held the call sign WAHC from 1993 to 1997
- WWWX, a radio station (96.7 FM) licensed to serve Oshkosh, Wisconsin, United States, which held the call sign WAHC from 1980 to 1989
- World Aquatic Health Conference sponsored by the National Swimming Pool Foundation
