= Respiratory risks of indoor swimming pools =

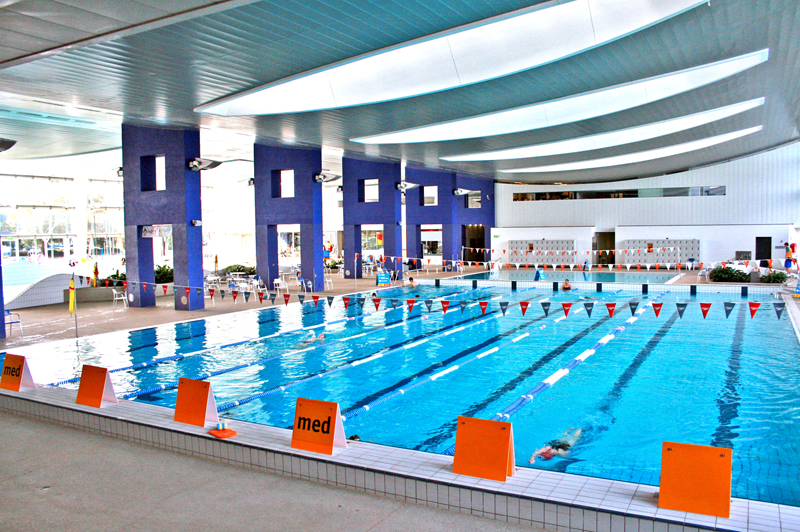
Indoor Swimming Pool

Respiratory risks of indoor swimming pools can include coughing, wheezing, aggravated asthma, and airway hyper-responsiveness (spasms of the bronchial tubes in the lungs causing coughing and chest tightness). The chemicals used for pool water disinfection can react with organic compounds in the water to create disinfection by-products or DBPs. Exposure to these DBPs are the potential cause for respiratory symptoms in swimmers. Multiple studies have shown the potential correlation between chronic exposure to DBPs and respiratory symptoms among competitive swimmers but more research is needed on the effects of these DBPs on recreational swimmers. Some studies have been done on the vulnerability of younger children and DBP exposure. Studies done on the vulnerability of younger children demonstrate that immature lungs are more likely to absorb more of these DBPs.
