= Urine-indicator dye =

Urban legend

Urine-indicator dye is a mythical substance that is supposed to be able to react with urine to form a colored cloud in a swimming pool or hot tub, thus indicating the location of people who are urinating while they are in the water. A 2015 report from the National Swimming Pool Foundation called this "the most common pool myth of all time", with nearly half of U.S. citizens surveyed by researchers believing that the dye existed.

Urine is difficult to detect, as many of the naturally occurring compounds within urine are unstable (i.e., short-lived, quickly disappearing) and react freely with common disinfectants, such as chlorine, creating a large number of disinfection by-product (DBP) compounds from the original organic chemicals in urine.

An accurate urine test would require testing for urine's chemical profile in addition to, or instead of, its byproducts produced by typical pool chemicals. However, testing for the presence and/or concentration of the byproducts, which can be created from several non-urine urea-containing sources such as sweat, would lead to many false positives, indicating that urine has been detected even if no urine was actually present, with significantly higher false positive rates in the case of people with uremic frost from impaired kidney function. This would mean that a dehydrated sweaty person, or a person with a medical condition, would be wrongly identified as urinating by such a dye.

Rumours of the origin of urine indicator-dye go back at least as far as 1958, and the story is commonly told to children by parents who do not want them to urinate in a pool. A 1985 biography of Orson Welles describes him using such a dye as part of a prank in 1937.

In the films Grown Ups and Take This Waltz, the myth is portrayed as fact for comedic effect.
