= Automated pool cleaner =

Type of vacuum cleaner for swimming pools

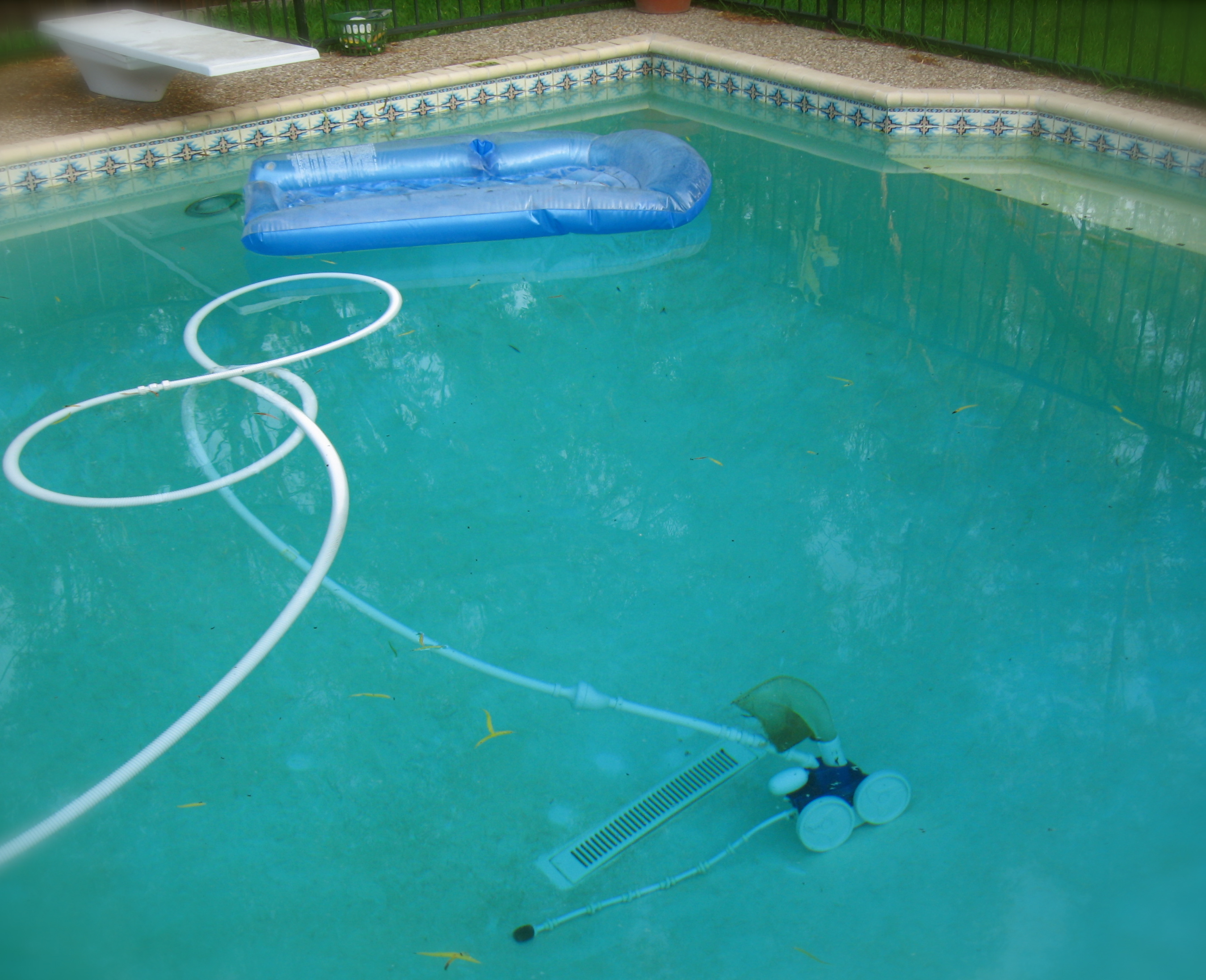
Below ground, outdoor pressure side automated pool cleaner visible at bottom

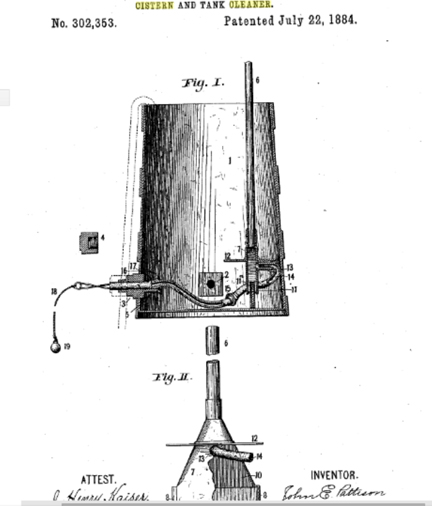
The first patented cistern cleaner, the forerunner of the swimming pool cleaner

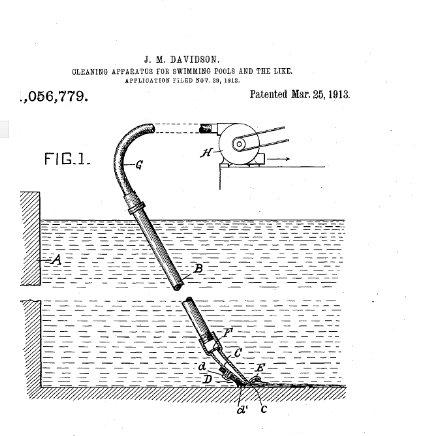
2012 was the Centennial anniversary of the first swimming pool cleaner.

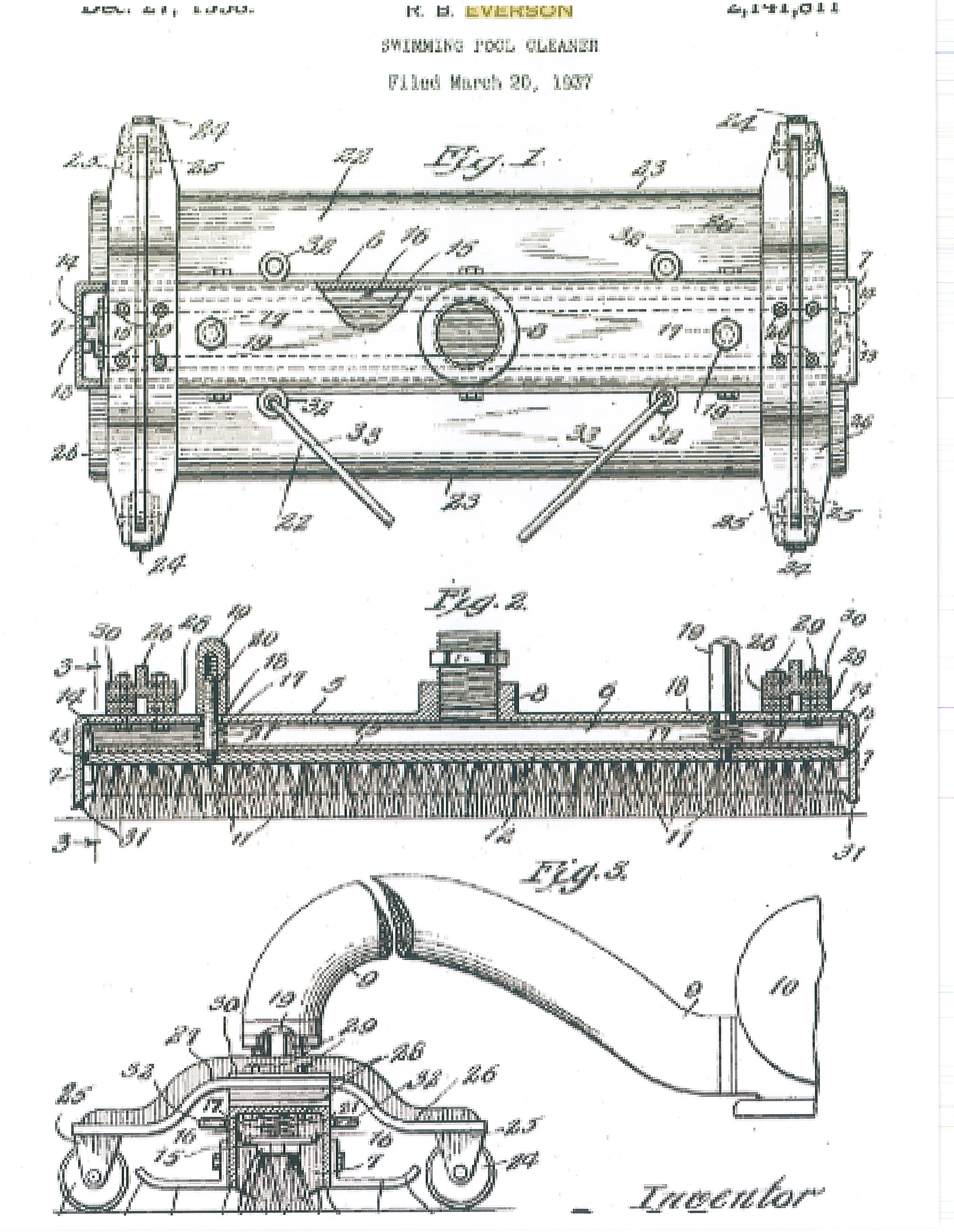
R.B. Everson invented the first suction-side pool vacuum cleaner.

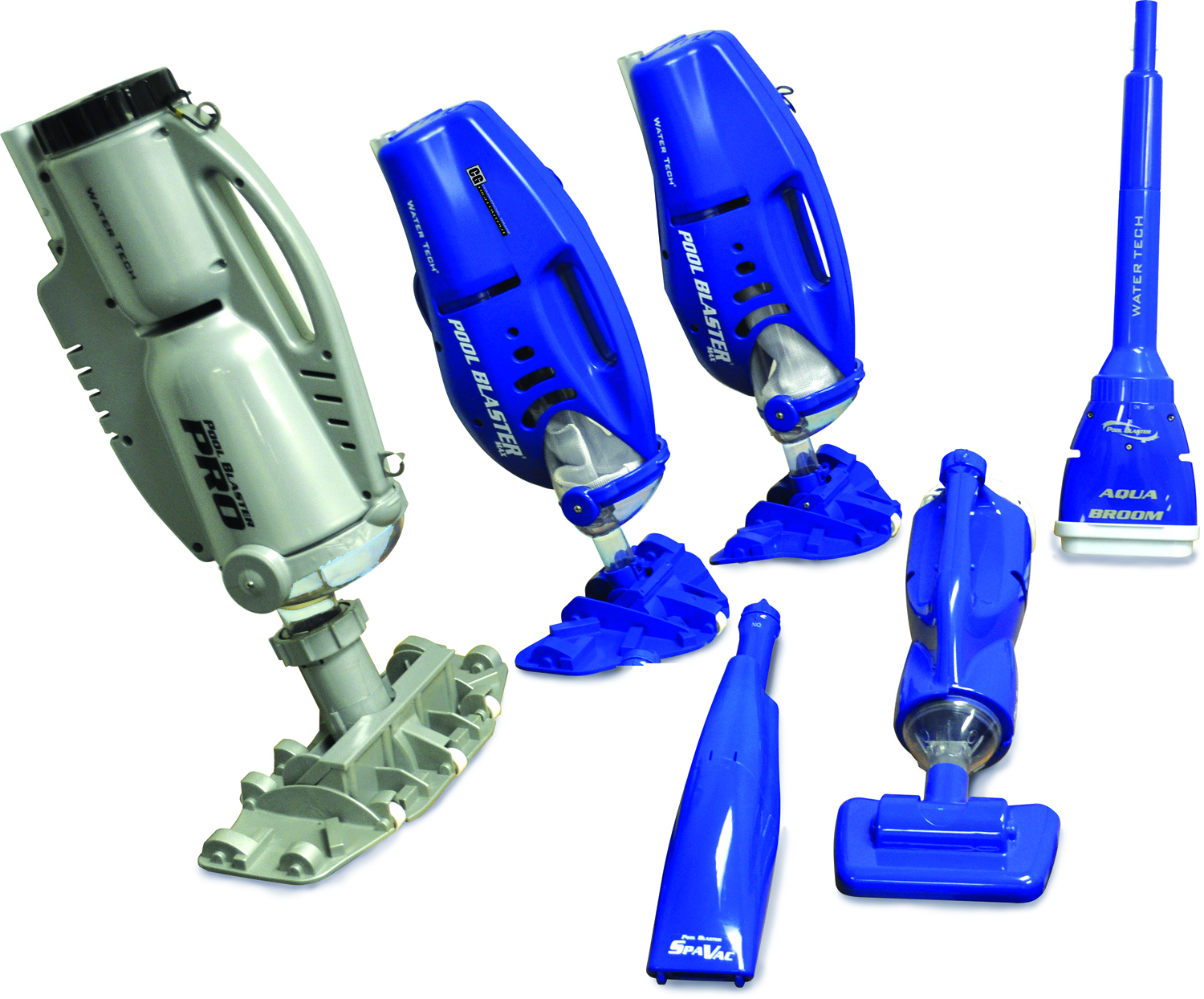
In 2002 the first handheld/extended reach, battery-powered pool and spa vacuums were finally invented. They now come in many sizes for all applications.

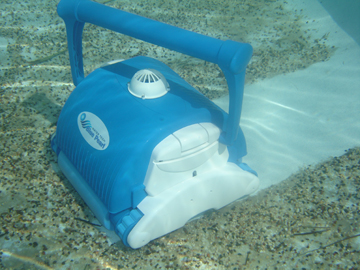
Typical electric robotic pool cleaner

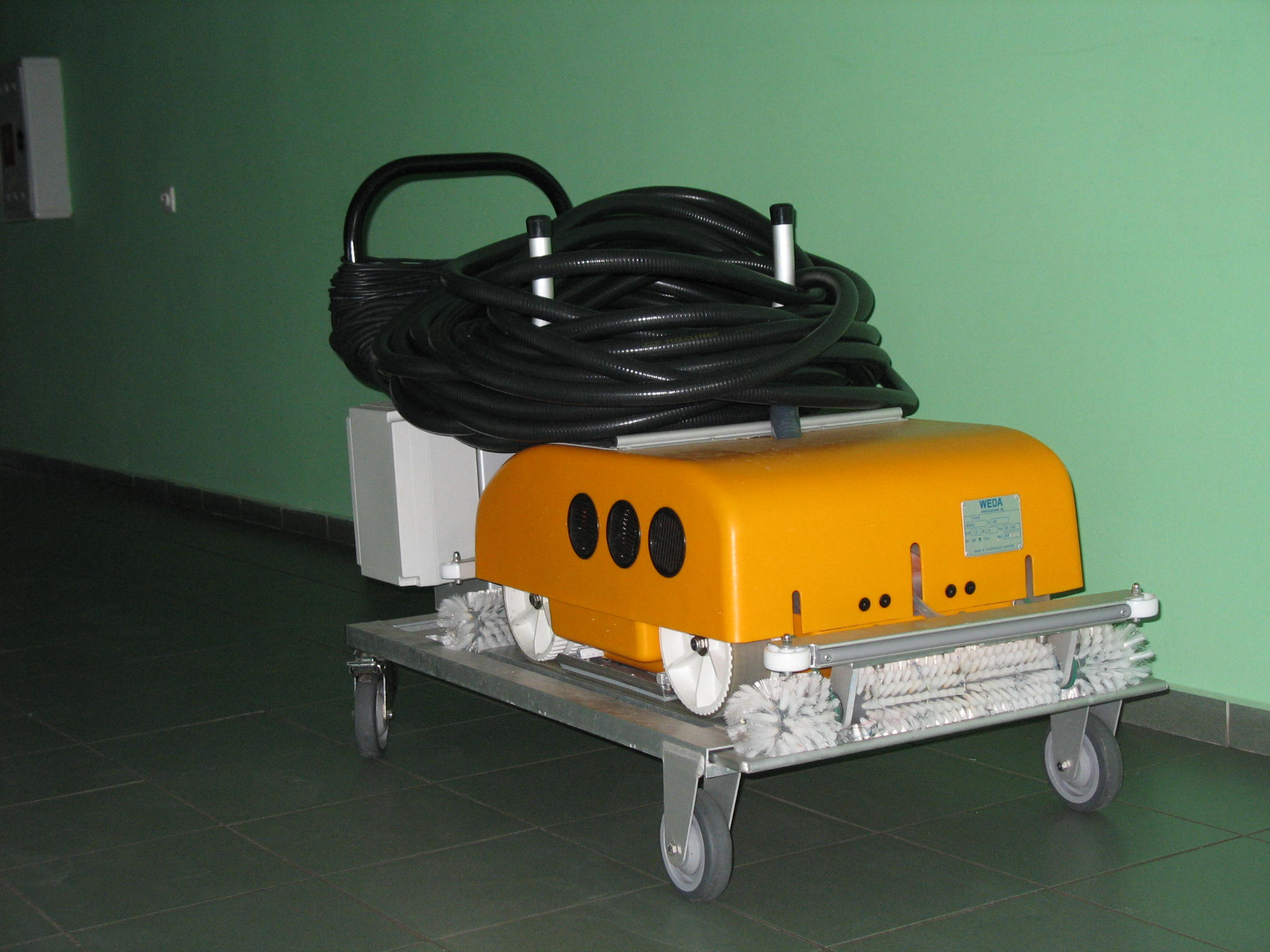
Weda B480 robotic commercial pool cleaner for the largest public pools. They now come in many smaller sizes from several manufacturers with a wide array of sophisticated, computerized programs.

An automated pool cleaner is a vacuum cleaner that is designed to collect debris and sediment from swimming pools with minimal human intervention.

== History ==
=== Evolution ===
Swimming pool cleaners evolved from the water filter and early cistern cleaners. The forerunner of today's pool cleaners were cistern cleaners; they were developed due to the need to clean pools and cisterns. Thermae were well known for their elaborate cisterns and prevalent in the early United States. The United States Patent and Trademark Office refers to a cistern cleaner patent filed (though never issued) as early as 1798.

In 1883 John E. Pattison of New Orleans applied for a "Cistern and Tank Cleaner" and the first discovered patent was issued the following year. It swept and scraped the bottom of a cistern or tank and, through a combination of suction and manipulation of the water pressure, was able to separate and remove sediment without removing the water. Over the next 20 years his invention was revised multiple times. Many pool cleaner patents issued in the modern era refer to some of the cistern cleaners as predecessors of their invention.

=== Early models ===
The first swimming pool cleaner was invented in 1912 by Pittsburgh, Pennsylvania citizen John M. Davison. On November 26, 1912, he submitted a patent application to the United States Patent and Trademark Office entitled "Cleaning Apparatus For Swimming Pools And The Like", which was issued on March 25, 1913.

The first suction-side pool cleaner was invented by Roy B. Everson of Chicago in 1937 and was named the "Swimming Pool Cleaner".

In 1953, another notable suction-side pool cleaner was created by Joseph Eistrup, who called his invention "Pool Cleaner". Two years later, the "Automatic Swimming Pool Cleaner" was created by Andrew L. Pansini; it was the first truly automatic pool cleaner and was touted by Pansini as "effective to remove the scum, dirt and other accumulations from both the bottom and sidewalls of a pool to disperse foreign matter in the water for removal therefrom by a normal pump-filter system of the pool".

The first robotic pool cleaner that used electricity was invented by Robert B. Myers in 1967.

The pressure-side cleaner was invented by Melvyn Lane Henkin in 1972. It was called the "Automatic Swimming Pool Cleaner" and it used three wheels to allow the machine "to travel underwater along a random path on the pool vessel surface for dislodging debris therefrom". The design is used in the Polaris Pool Cleaner, a commonly used pool cleaner amongst modern pool owners.

Independently from his American counterparts, Ferdinand Chauvier, a hydraulics engineer who emigrated to South Africa from the Belgian Congo, introduced the Kreepy Krauly in Springs, South Africa, in 1974.

== Types ==
There are three main types of automated or automatic swimming pool cleaners, classified by the drive mechanism and source of power used: a suction side cleaner, a pressure side cleaner, and an electric robotic cleaner.

=== Suction-side ===
This type of pool cleaner pumps water out of the pool via its skimmer or drains, uses it for locomotion and debris suction, then returns it after being filtered via pool return or outlet valves. This is the least expensive and most popular type of cleaner, and it traces a random course around the pool. This type of cleaner is usually attached via a 1.5-inch hose to a vacuum plate in the skimmer, or a dedicated extraction or "vac" line on the side of the pool. The suction action of the pool's pump provides the needed force for the machine to randomly traverse the floor and walls of the pool, extracting dirt and debris in its path. The first automatic pool cleaner was a suction cleaner.

Suction-side cleaners are the least expensive and most widely used pool cleaners. The price of suction-side cleaners ranges from UD$250-US$650. They are powered solely by the main pump of the pool and utilize the pool's filter system to remove dirt and debris from the water. Suction-side cleaners are best suited for screened-in pools or those with light debris such as sand. Large amounts of debris or larger debris such as leaves and sticks can easily clog the unit or its pump basket. These machines effectively diminish the suction of the main pump - using them will increase the electricity costs and require the main pump and filter system to be serviced more frequently. Suction side cleaners are less powerful than other types of cleaners. There are minimal maintenance and part replacement costs on these devices over time.

=== Pressure-side ===
In this design, pool water inflow is further pressurized using a secondary "booster" pump on most but not all models. This high-pressure water is used for locomotion and debris suction to exploit the Venturi effect. The cleaner traces a random course around the pool. The requirement of a booster pump makes pressure-side cleaners the most expensive in terms of electricity use.

The pressure causes turbulence in the water, distributing some debris onto the floor and walls of the pool, some of which are re-floated to the pool surface before being sucked into the main filter through the skimmer inlets. A portion of the dirt and debris is caught in an attached filter bag. Pressure-side cleaners are better suited for handling a heavy amount of debris. They are also better for large debris such as leaves, acorns, and sticks. The purchase cost of this type of cleaner range from $200 to about $700 plus the costs of the booster pump, usually over $200. Some more sophisticated models can cost over $1,000.

Both suction-side and pressure-side cleaners are dependent on the pool's main pump and filter system to remove contaminants from the pool water, which results in the inability to remove particles smaller than the pore size of the pool's existing filter element. Such elements can be sand, diatomaceous earth, zeolite, or other natural or synthetic materials. That particle size ranges from under 5 μm for diatomaceous filters to 50+ μm for sand filters.

=== Electric robot ===
These cleaners are independent of the pool's main filter and pump system and are powered by a separate electricity source, usually in the form of a set-down transformer that is kept at least 10 feet (3.0 m) from the pool. They have two internal motors: one to suck in water through a self-contained filter bag and eject the filtered water back into the pool, and another that is a drive motor connected to tractor-like rubber or synthetic tracks and "brushes" tied by rubber or plastic bands to a metal shaft. The brushes, which resemble paint rollers, are located on the front and back of the machine and help remove contaminant particles from the pool's floor and walls (in some designs even the pool steps are included) depending on size and configuration. They also direct the particles into the internal filter bag.

An internal microchip is programmed to control the drive motors. The chip causes the machine to change direction when it reaches a wall or the water surface after climbing the pool walls.

These machines may also be directed by sensors located in the bump bars which, on contact with objects such as a wall, cause a reverse in direction, with a small offset allowing it to move one machine's width over on each crossing of the pool. The delay timer is an important feature for many pools, as many switch off several circulation pumps during the night to allow suspended particles to settle on the bottom of the pool; after a couple of hours, the pool cleaner begins its cleaning cycle. This cleaning cycle is set up to complete before the pumps are turned back on. Although the feature is not necessary for adequate pool cleaning, it saves energy and improves cleaning efficiency.

To move forward and backward and navigate walls and steps, electric robotic cleaners rely on three natural principles: traction and movement caused by the drive motor and tracks, buoyancy created by the large areas inside the machine that fills with air, and the force resulting from the high pressure of water being emitted from the top of the machine that pushes it against the floor and walls. Some electric robotic machines use brushes made out of polyvinyl alcohol (PVA), which has an adhesive quality that allows the unit to cling to the walls, steps, and floors. It is resistant to dirt and oil, which improves its lifespan over rubber or other synthetic materials.

The combination of these three natural principles and an internal mercury switch that tells the microchip that the unit has gone from a horizontal to a vertical position allows it to change direction from ascending to descending the wall at pre-programmed intervals based on the average height of swimming pool walls. Some machines have delayed timers that cause the robot to remain at the waterline, where more dirt accumulates, to momentarily scrub.

The major benefits of these machines are efficiency in time, energy, and cleaning ability and low-maintenance requirements and costs. The major disadvantage is purchase cost which can range from $500 to $1,500. The smart navigation system present on many robots makes it possible to cover the entire more easily.

== Commercial versions ==
All commercial pool cleaners are electric robotic and can range in price from a little over $1,000 to upwards of $15,000. They closely resemble residential models but in addition to their addition size, they are made with heavy-duty components, more sophisticated computer guidance, and on-and-off systems. In the US, commercial pool cleaners need to be certified by the National Spa Pool Foundation (NSPF) as Certified Pool Operators (CPO).

== Controlling legislation ==
There have been attempts for nearly 100 years to mandate the use of pool cleaners, primarily addressed to public pools. The Centers for Disease Control and Prevention in Atlanta, Georgia, on a grant provided by the National Swimming Pool Foundation (NSPF), published the first uniform Model Aquatic Health Code (MAHC).

=== Historical perspective ===
The proposed MAHC is not the first attempt to propose a uniform aquatic health code. The American Public Health Association (APHA) recognized the dangers of improperly maintained aquatic facilities and formed a committee in 1918 that, for the next 66 years, issued eleven "Swimming Pools and Other Public Bathing Places Standards For Design, Construction, Equipment And Operation" recommended ordinances and regulations. But for a variety of reasons none of these recommendations were adopted, at least not formally or completely adopted.

The APHA has tried to develop a uniform aquatic health code, or what is referred to for years as referenced above, and published short reports annually from 1920 through 1925 that it simply referred to as "Report of the Committee On Bathing Places". In 1926 it published its first comprehensive report in its journal: "Standards for Design, Construction, Equipment, and Operation for Swimming Pools and Other Public Bathing Places". Twelve other reports were published through 1981.

However, its lack of authoritative power is implied by the changing description of what was limited to their recommendations or suggestions and the expressed purposes in issuing them. In 1957, it referred to its report as "Recommended Practice for Design, Equipment, and Operation of Swimming Pools and Other Public Bathing Places". The AHPA referred to its report in 1964 as "Suggested Ordinance and Regulations Covering Public Swimming Pools", with a modified one for "Private Swimming Pools" in 1970. Its last report in 1981 was called "Public Swimming Pools: Recommended Regulations for Design and Construction, Operation and Maintenance".

In 1912, coincidentally the same year when the United States Patent and Trademark Office issued the first patent for a swimming pool cleaner, the Sanitary Engineering Section of the APHA convened in New York City to lay the groundwork for the first recommended pool and spa regulations. As reported in the American Journal of Public Health in April 1912, a meeting was held in Havana the previous December. One of the subjects being studied at the New York meeting was the "Hygiene of swimming pools".

In 1918, a committee on swimming pools was appointed at the APHA's annual meeting in Chicago and a similar committee was appointed at the meeting in Washington, D.C., two years later. Despite their intended and published goals, none became law, uniform, much less national.

None of the proposed Standards included more than a passing reference of the need to properly clean a pool. A few, but not all of these recommended ordinances and regulations, related to the use of a vacuum, though the first that included any specificity in 1923 at least required a certain level of clarity. The 1921 report, barely a few pages in length, made this reference to the need to clean the pool:

Pool cleaning is done by completely emptying the pool an average of twice weekly and scrubbing with stiff brushes and soap. Hose flushing follows the scrubbing. After the flushing outlet is opened, the well-turned on and clean water is allowed to water over the floor of the drains, etc...

The 1923 report of the American Journal of Public Health, Sanitary Engineering Section American Public Health Association read before the Sanitary Engineering Section of the American Public Health Association at the Fifty-second Annual Meeting at Boston, Massachusetts, October 8, 1923. slightly longer, but still very brief, stated:

Section 3. Clearness: At all times when the pool is in use the water shall be sufficiently clear to permit a black disk six inches in diameter on a white field, placed on the bottom of the pool at the deepest point, to be visible from both sides of the pool when the water is quiet.

It also stated:

No swimming pool shall be opened to the use of bathers on any day until all visible dirt (not stains) on the bottom of the pool and any visible scum or floating matter on the surface has been removed. Scum and floating matters may be infectious material and should always be removed as soon as possible after they are observed.

In 1921, the fact that infectious material, namely pathogens collect in the pool and should be removed was recognized.

It was not until 1926 that the first true report was issued and later published in the Journal of the American Public Health Association. Of all of its reports from 1920 through 1981, the first major report by the APHA in 1926, written in narrative form as were the succeeding nine until 1957, the committee included the detailed provisions relating to pool cleaning, vacuuming and vacuums:

E. Suction Cleaner: In the opinion of the committee the only satisfactory method of removing the dirt, hair, etc., settling on the bottom of a pool is using a suction cleaner. As the circulation pumps generally operate such cleaners, they may be classed as an adjunct to the recirculation system. When a suction cleaner is to be operated by the recirculation pump, a gate with a graduated stem or another registering device should be provided for throttling the flow from the pool outlet to permit the pump to operate at maximum efficiency when the suction cleaner is in use. Fixed pipe connections for attachment of suction cleaner to pump suction should be of ample size to reduce friction to a minimum, and the cleaner and all removable connections should be designed to provide a maximum velocity at the suction nozzle.

XXVI Cleaning Pool

A. Visible dirt on the bottom of a swimming pool shall not be permitted to remain more than 24 hours. B. Any visible scum or floating material on the surface of a pool shall be removed within 24 hours by flushing or other effective means

The 1964 report included the following language:

A vacuum-cleaning system shall be provided. When an integral part of the recirculation system, sufficient connections shall be located in the walls of the swimming pool, at least eight inches below the waterline and, "Visible dirt on the bottom of the swimming pool shall be removed every 24 hours or more frequently as required. Visible scum or floating matter on the swimming pool surface shall be removed within 24 hours by flushing or other effective means.

The CDC was founded (in 1946), followed by the Cabinet-level Department of Health, Education and Welfare (in 1953), now the Department of Health, and Human Services and its eleven operating divisions, the National Health Service Corps (in 1977), and a variety of private and non-profit aquatic organizations such as the National Spa and Pool Association (in 1956), now the Association of Pool and Spa Professionals the National Swimming Pool Foundation (in 1965).

A variety of states and jurisdictions have codified the requirement of inclusion of an independent vacuum cleaner, including the two states with the highest number and concentration of both residential and public pools:

California: 2010 Title 24, Part 2, Vol. 2 California Building Code. Section 3140B, Cleaning Systems:

A vacuum cleaning system shall be available which is capable of removing sediment from all parts of the pool floor. A cleaning system using potable water shall be provided with an approved backflow protection device as required by the California Department of Public Health under Sections 7601 to 7605.

—

Florida: Florida Department of Health section 64E-9.007 Recirculation and Treatment System Requirements:

(12) Cleaning system – A portable or plumbed in vacuum cleaning system shall be provided. All vacuum pumps shall be equipped with hair and lint strainers. Recirculation or separate vacuum pumps shall not be used for vacuuming purposes when above 3 horsepower. When the system is plumbed in, the vacuum fittings shall be located to allow cleaning the pool with a 50-foot maximum length of hose. Vacuum fittings shall be mounted no more than 15 inches below the water level, flush with the pool walls, and shall be provided with a spring-loaded safety cover which shall be in place at all times. Bag type cleaners that operate as ejectors on potable water supply pressure must be protected by a vacuum breaker. Cleaning devices shall not be used while the pool is open to bathers.

—

=== Call to action ===
In 2005 the CDC, in response to growing concern and feared epidemic with the pathogen Cryptosporidium, much like the APHA did in 1912, gathered many of the United States' foremost medical and scientific experts to study the concern for aquatic health. As a result, in 2007 they began to consolidate a uniform aquatic health code.

Each health and safety segment was assigned to a committee to study it and draft a proposed module open for public comment before being adopted and recommended to the nation's 3200+ state and local health agencies that enact ordinances and regulations for swimming pools and spa and other aquatic facilities, inspect and monitor the facilities, and enforce the regulations. Since the focus of the MAHC was to respond to the threat of Cryptosporidium the Technical Committee of Recirculation Systems and Filtration is a major focus.

University of North Carolina Charlotte Associate Professor James Amburgey conducted many tests to evaluate existing swimming pool filters and he concluded that they have been extremely ineffective in removing Cryptosporidium in most cases.

== See also ==
- Domestic robot
- Hot tub
- Robotic vacuum cleaner
- Water purification
