= Swimming pool =

Artificial water basin for swimming

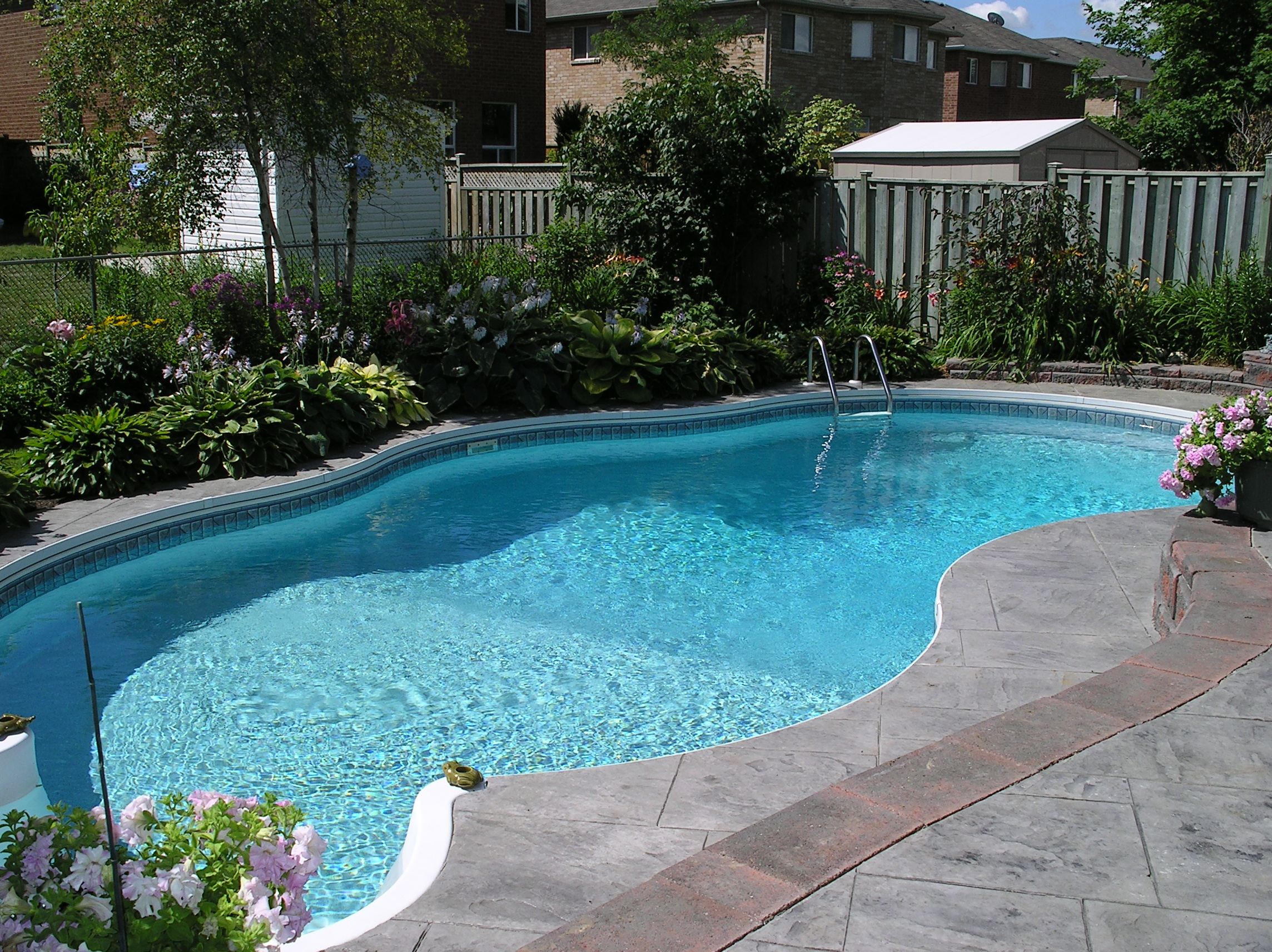
Backyard swimming pool

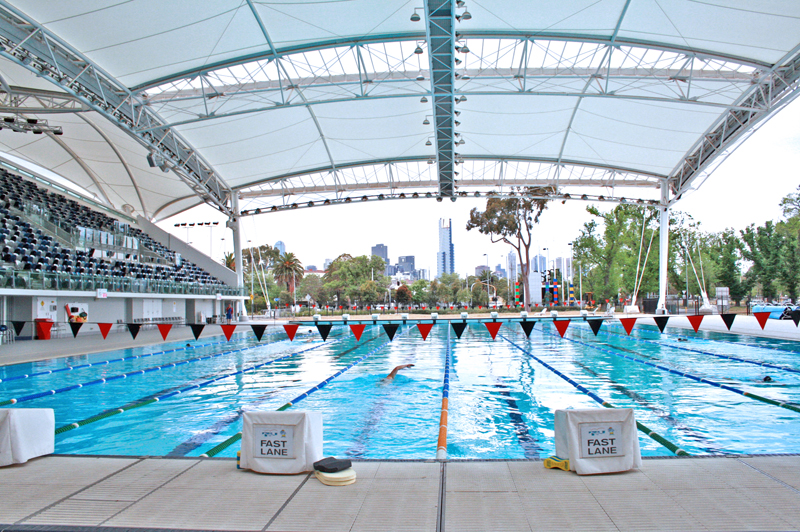
Olympic-size swimming pool and starting blocks at Melbourne Sports and Aquatic Centre used for the 2006 Commonwealth Games in Melbourne, Australia

A swimming pool, swimming bath, wading pool, paddling pool, or simply pool, is a structure designed to hold water to enable swimming and associated activities. Pools can be built into the ground (in-ground pools) or built above ground (as a freestanding construction or as part of a building or other larger structure), and may be found as a feature aboard ships. In-ground pools are most commonly constructed from materials such as concrete, natural stone, metal, plastic, composite or fiberglass, and may follow a standardized size, the largest of which is the Olympic-size swimming pool, or be of a custom shape.

Many health clubs, fitness centers, and private clubs have pools for their members, often used for exercise. In much of the world, local governments provide publicly-run pools. Some of these are outdoors; indoor pools are often part of a leisure centre. Many hotels have a pool for the use of their guests. Pools as a feature in hotels are more common in tourist areas or near convention centers. Many universities and other institutional communities provide pools for their members, often as part of an institution-specific athletic or recreational complex. Apartment complexes and residential subdivisions may provide a pool for the use of their residents. Private residences, particularly in areas with warm climates, may have their own pools.

Educational facilities such as high schools and universities often have pools for physical education classes, recreational activities, leisure, and competitive athletics such as swimming teams. Hot tubs and spas are small heated pools used for relaxation or hydrotherapy. Specialised pools are also used for diving, water sports, and physical therapy, as well as for training of lifeguards and astronauts. Swimming pools most commonly use chlorinated water, or salt water, and may be heated or unheated.

== History ==
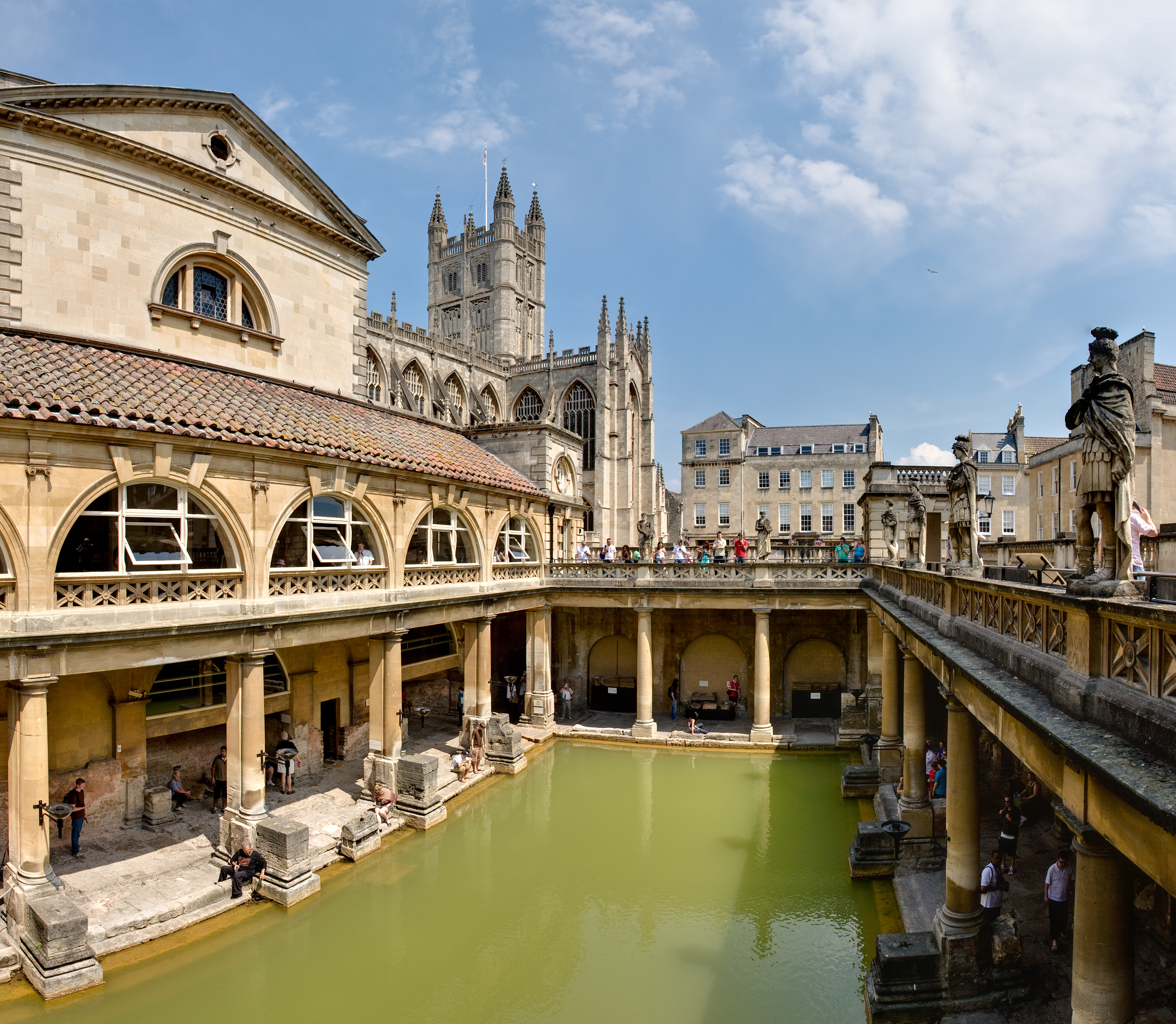
Ancient Roman baths in Bath, England

=== Pre-modern ===
The "Great Bath" at the site of Mohenjo-Daro in modern-day Pakistan was most likely the first swimming pool, dug during the 3rd millennium BC. This pool is 12 by 7 metres (39 by 23 feet), is lined with bricks, and was covered with a tar-based sealant.

Ancient Greeks and Romans built artificial pools for athletic training in the palaestras, for nautical games and for military exercises. Roman emperors had private swimming pools in which fish were also kept, hence one of the Latin words for a pool was piscina. The first heated swimming pool was built by Gaius Maecenas in his gardens on the Esquiline Hill of Rome, likely sometime between 38 and 8 BC. Gaius Maecenas was a wealthy imperial advisor to Augustus and considered one of the first patrons of arts.

Ancient Sinhalese built a pair of pools called "Kuttam Pokuna" in the kingdom of Anuradhapura, Sri Lanka, in the 6th century AD. They were decorated with flights of steps, punkalas or pots of abundance, and scroll design.

=== 19th and 20th centuries ===
Swimming pools became popular in Britain in the mid-19th century. As early as 1837, six indoor pools with diving boards existed in London, England. The Maidstone Swimming Club in Maidstone, Kent is believed to be the oldest surviving swimming club in Britain. It was formed in 1844, in response to concerns over drownings in the River Medway, especially since would-be rescuers would often drown because they themselves could not swim to safety. The club used to swim in the River Medway, and would hold races, diving competitions and water polo matches. The South East Gazette July 1844 reported an aquatic breakfast party: coffee and biscuits were served on a floating raft in the river. The coffee was kept hot over a fire; club members had to tread water and drink coffee at the same time. The last swimmers managed to overturn the raft, to the amusement of 150 spectators.

The Amateur Swimming Association (now known as Swim England) was founded in 1869 in England, and the Oxford Swimming Club in 1909. In 1939, Oxford created its first major public indoor pool at Temple Cowley.

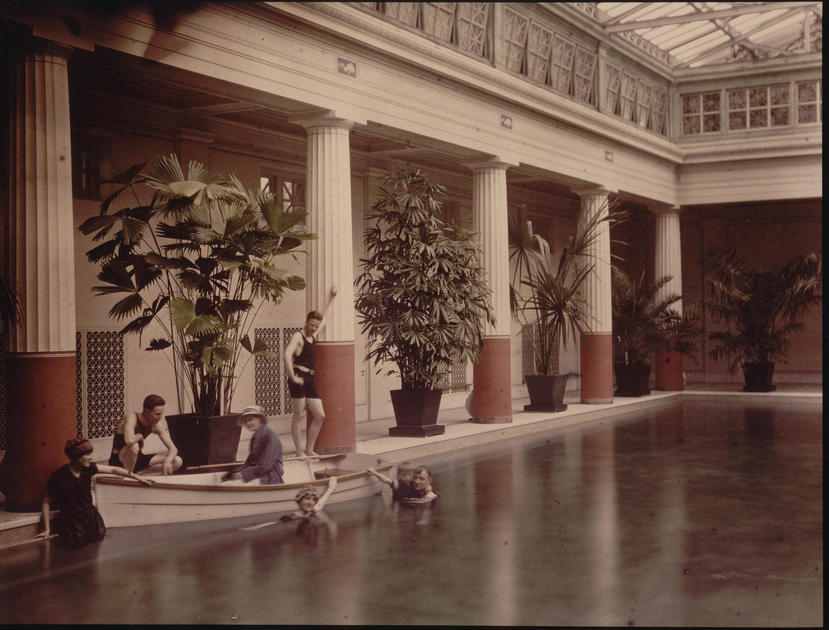
Swimming pool at Lyndhurst estate in Tarrytown, New York, United States, constructed in 1911 (photo c. 1920). Known as "Helen's Bath," it was built by the estate owner, prominent philanthropist Helen Miller Shepard (in the boat), who opened it to the public. The pool had full-time lifeguards (shown in the photo); swimming instructions were provided to local boys and girls (young girls, especially, had little opportunity to learn to swim at the time).

The modern Olympic Games started in 1896 and included swimming races, after which the popularity of swimming pools began to spread. In the US, the Racquet Club of Philadelphia clubhouse (1907) boasts one of the world's first modern above-ground swimming pools. The first swimming pool to go to sea on an ocean liner was installed on the White Star Line's Adriatic in 1906. The oldest known public swimming pool in the U.S., Underwood Pool, is located in Belmont, Massachusetts.

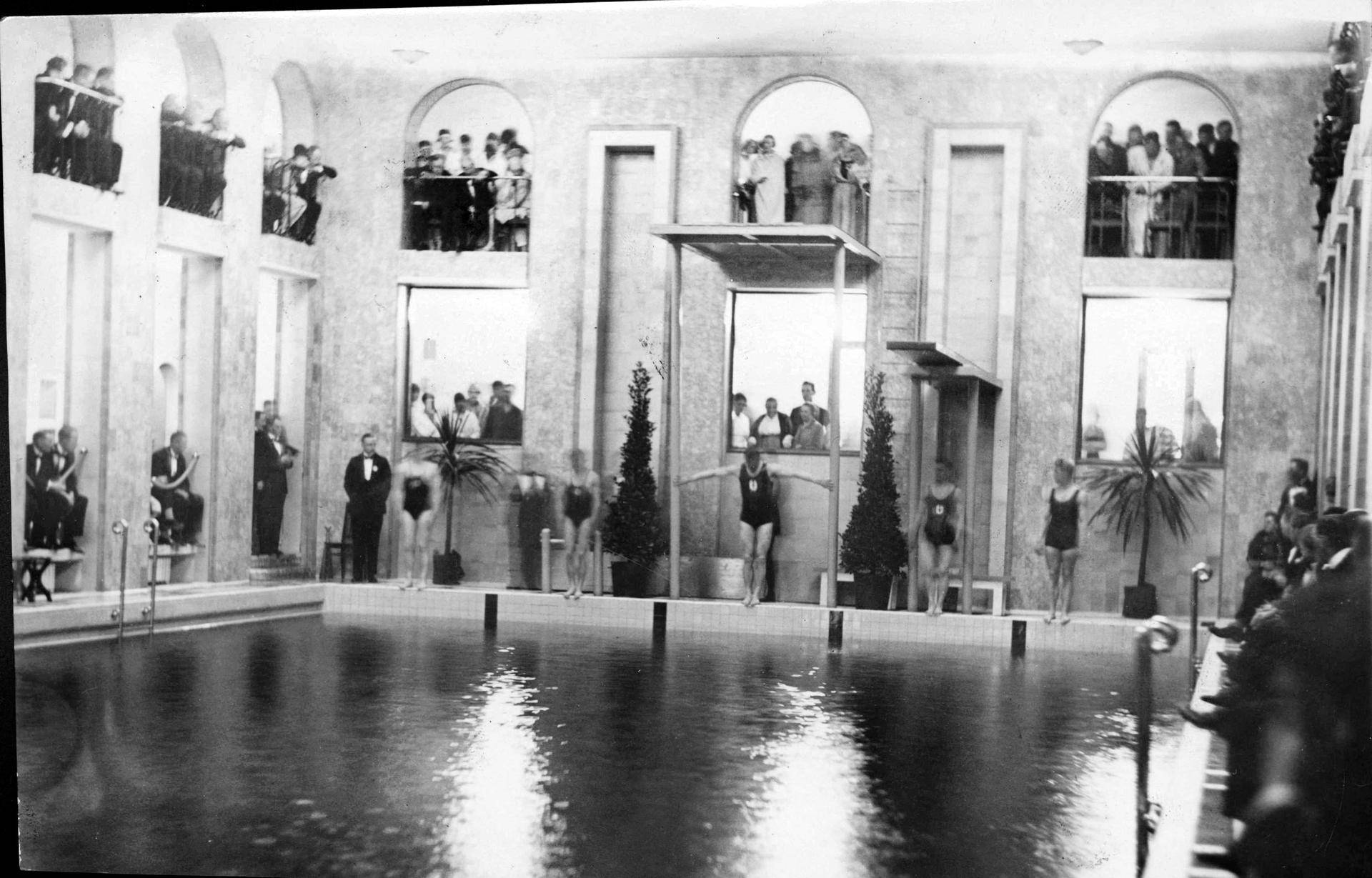
The Yrjönkatu Swimming Hall, the oldest swimming hall in Finland, photographed on its opening day on 4 June 1928 in Kamppi, Helsinki

Interest in competitive swimming grew following World War I. Standards improved and training became essential. Home swimming pools became popular in the United States after World War II and the publicity given to swimming sports by Hollywood films such as Esther Williams' Million Dollar Mermaid made a home pool a desirable status symbol. More than 50 years later, the home or residential swimming pool is a common sight. Some small nations enjoy a thriving swimming pool industry (e.g., New Zealand pop. 4,116,900 – holds the record in pools per capita with 65,000 home swimming pools and 125,000 spa pools).

A two-storey, white concrete swimming pool building composed of horizontal cubic volumes built in 1959 at the Royal Roads Military College is on the Canadian Register of Historic Places.

=== World records ===
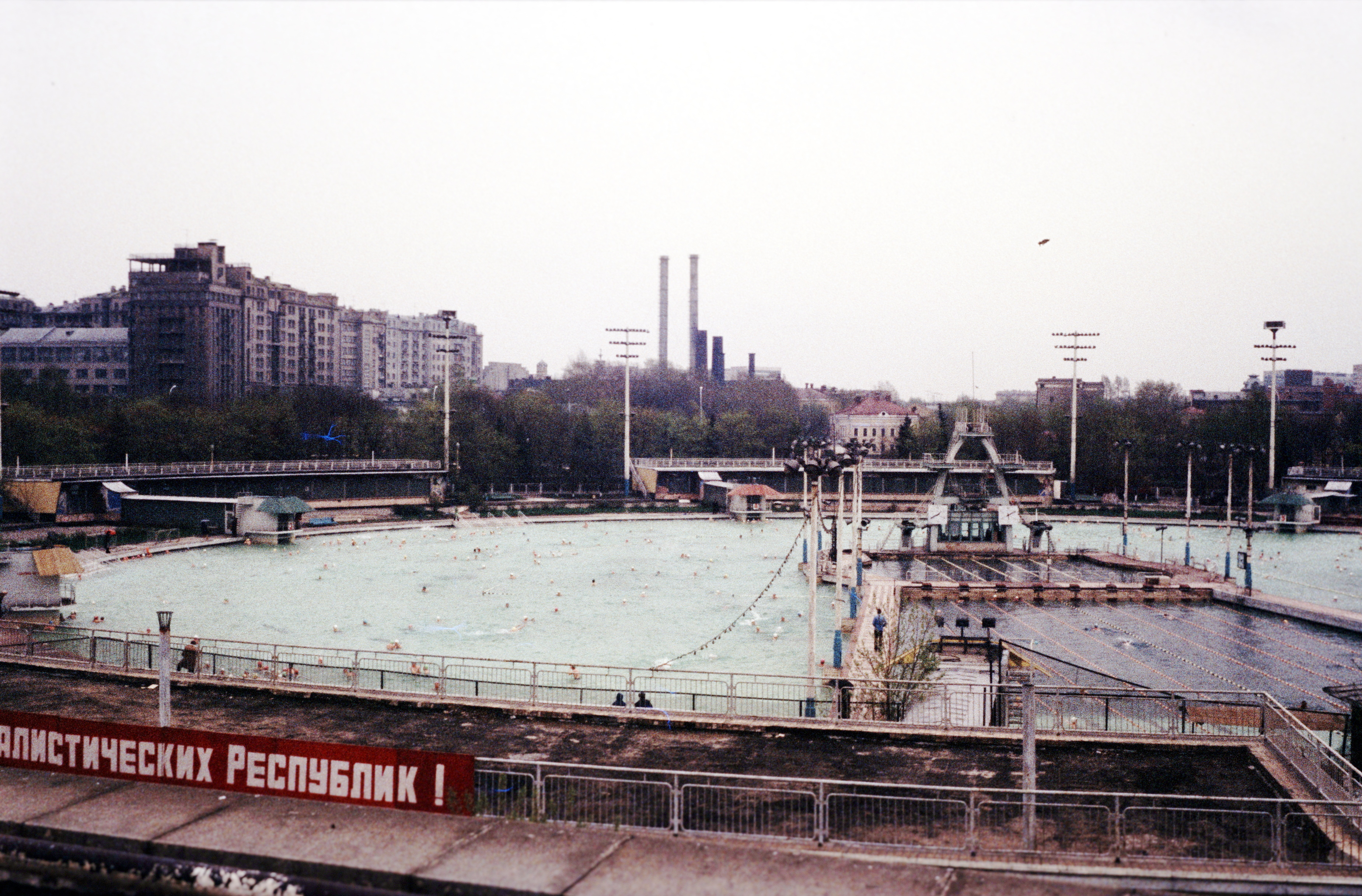
Moskva Pool, at one time the largest swimming pool in the world (1980)

According to the Guinness World Records, the largest swimming pool in the world is San Alfonso del Mar Seawater pool in Algarrobo, Chile. It is 1,013 m (3,323 ft) long and has an area of 8 ha (20 acres). At its deepest, it is 3.5 m (11 ft) deep. It was completed in December 2006.

The largest indoor wave pool in the world is at DreamWorks Water Park within the American Dream shopping and entertainment complex at the Meadowlands Sports Complex in East Rutherford, New Jersey, United States, and the largest indoor pool in North America is at the Neutral Buoyancy Lab in the Sonny Carter Training Facility at NASA JSC in Houston.

In 2021, Deep Dive Dubai, located in Dubai, UAE, was certified by the Guinness Book of World Records as the world's deepest swimming pool reaching 60 metres (200 ft). The Y-40 swimming pool at the Hotel Terme Millepini in Padua, Italy, previously held the record, 42.15 m (138.3 ft), from 2014 until 2021.

The Fleishhacker Pool in San Francisco was the largest heated outdoor swimming pool in the United States. Opened on 23 April 1925, it measured 1,000 by 150 ft (300 by 50 m) and was so large that the lifeguards required kayaks for patrol. It was closed in 1971 due to low patronage.

In Europe, the largest swimming pool opened in 1934 in Elbląg (Poland), providing a water area of 33,500 square metres (361,000 sq ft).

One of the largest swimming pools ever built was reputedly created in Moscow after the Palace of Soviets remained uncompleted. The foundations of the palace were converted into the Moskva Pool open-air swimming pool after the process of de-Stalinisation.

The highest swimming pool is believed to be in Yangbajain (Tibet, China). This resort is located at 4,200 m (13,800 ft) AMSL and has two indoor swimming pools and one outdoor swimming pool, all filled with water from hot springs.

== Dimensions ==
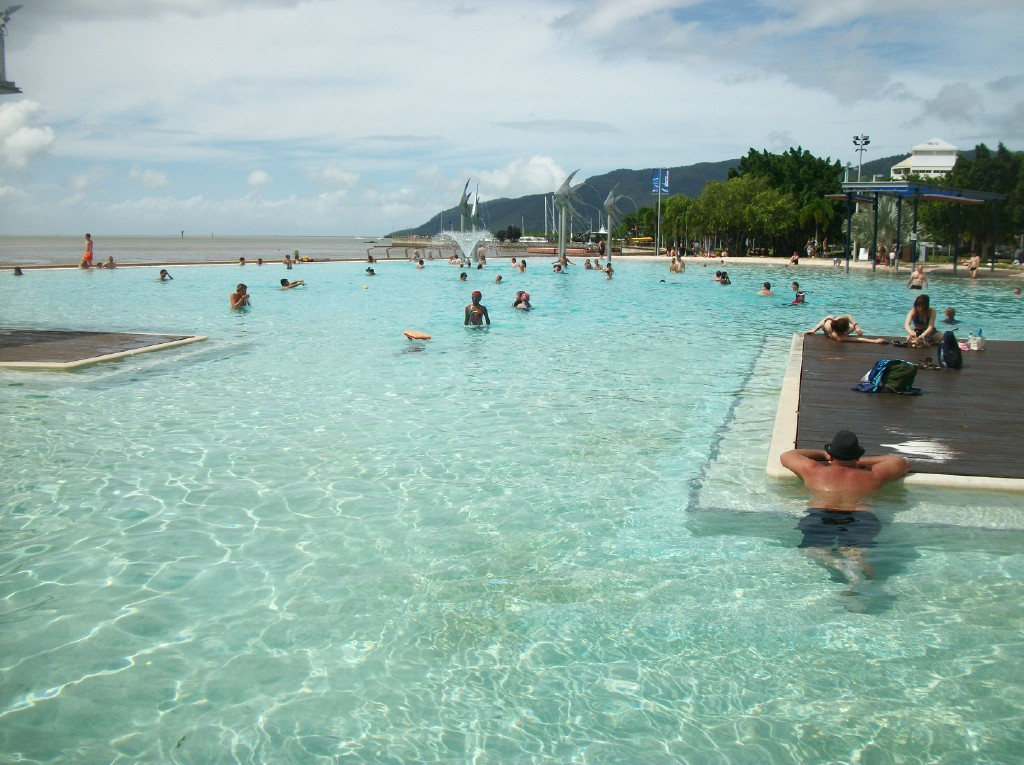
Cairns Lagoon, a public swimming pool in Australia

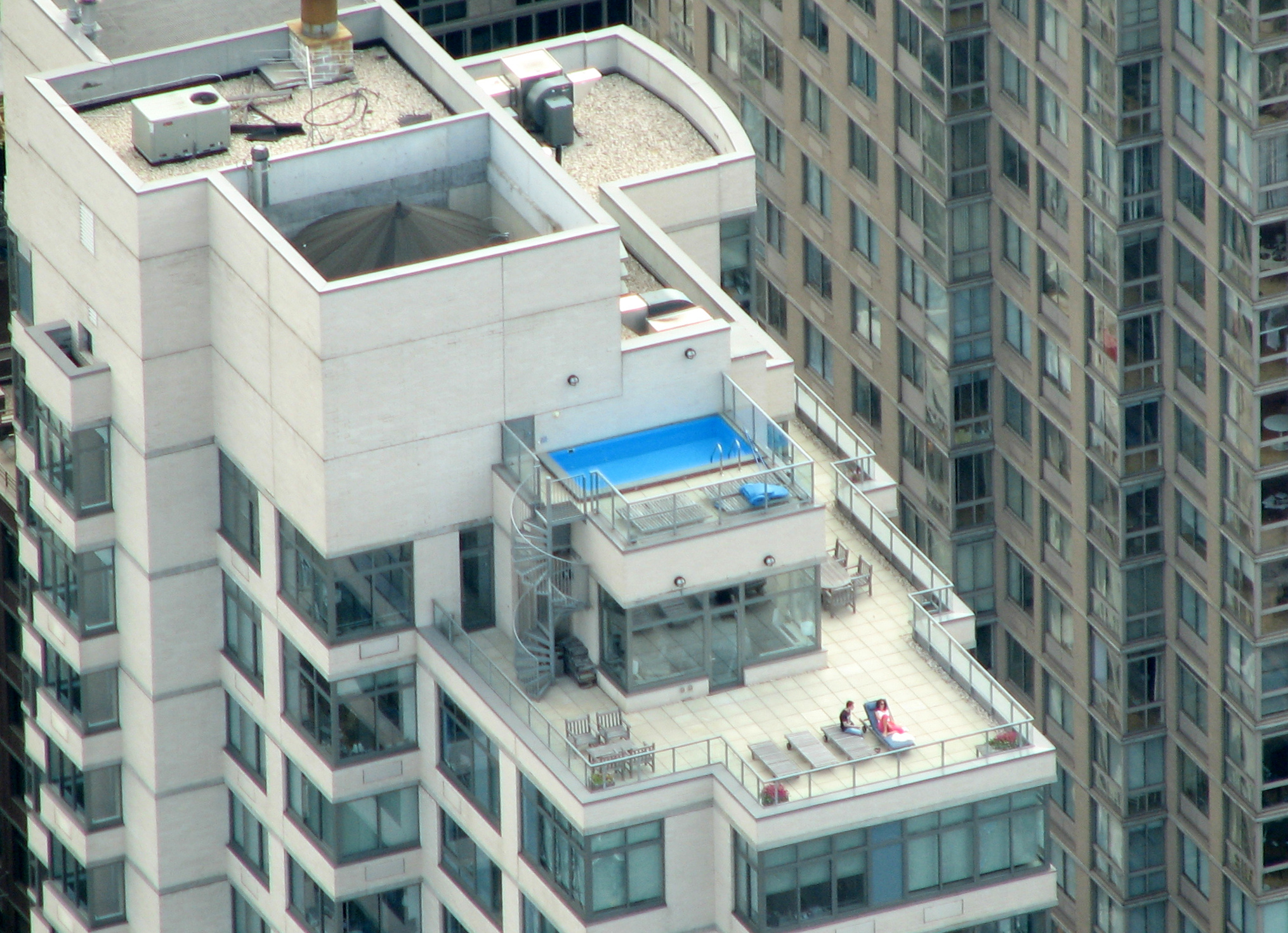
Rooftop pool in Manhattan

Length: Most pools in the world are measured in metres, but in the United States pools are often measured in feet and yards. In the UK most pools are calibrated in metres, but older pools measured in yards still exist. In the US, pools tend to either be 25 yards (SCY-short course yards), 25 metres (SCM-short course metres) or 50 metres (LCM - long course meters). US high schools and the NCAA conduct short course (25 yards) competition. There are also many pools 33 1/3 m long, so that 3 lengths = 100 m. This pool dimension can also be used to accommodate water polo.

USA Swimming (USA-S) swims in both metric and non-metric pools. However, the international standard is metres, and world records are only recognized when swum in 50 m pools (or 25 m for short course) but 25-yard pools are very common in the US. In general, the shorter the pool, the faster the time for the same distance, since the swimmer gains speed from pushing off the wall after each turn at the end of the pool.

Width: The width of the pool depends on the number of swimming lanes and the width of each individual lane. In an Olympic swimming pool each lane is 2.5 meters wide and contains 10 lanes, thus making the pool 25 meters wide.

Depth: The depth of a swimming pool depends on the purpose of the pool, and whether it is open to the public or strictly for private use. If it is a private casual, relaxing pool, it may go from 1.0 to 2.0 m (3.3 to 6.6 ft) deep. If it is a public pool designed for diving, it may slope from 3.0 to 5.5 m (10 to 18 ft) in the deep end. A children's play pool may be from 0.3 to 1.2 m (1 to 4 ft) deep. Most public pools have differing depths to accommodate different swimmer requirements. In many jurisdictions, it is a requirement to show the water depth with clearly marked depths affixed to the pool walls, although this may not be the case for private pools in some jurisdictions.

== Types ==
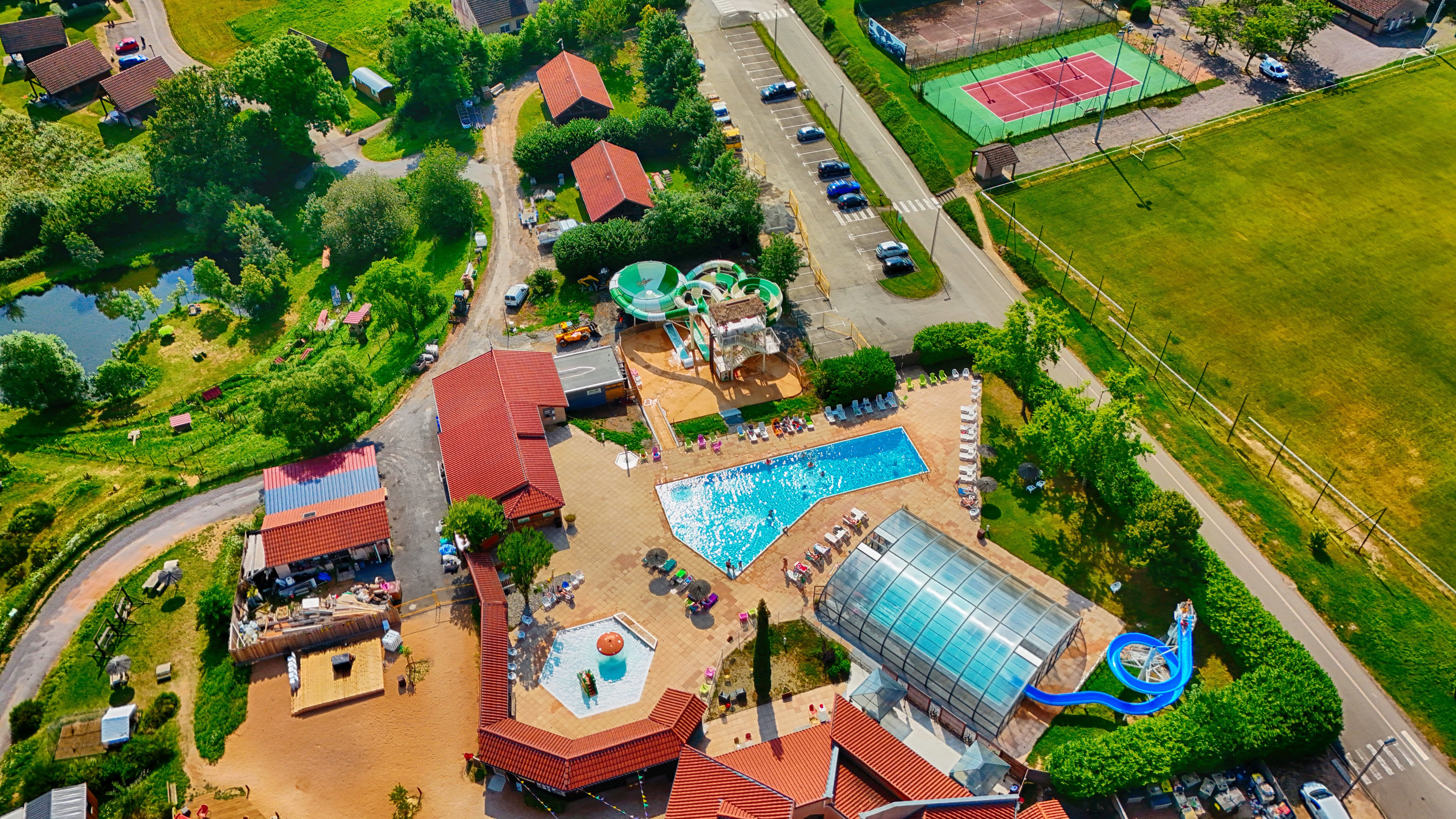
Aerial view of a swimming pool complex

Pools can be either indoors or outdoors. They can be of any size and shape, and inground or above ground. Most pools are permanent fixtures, while others are temporary, collapsible structures.

=== Private pools ===
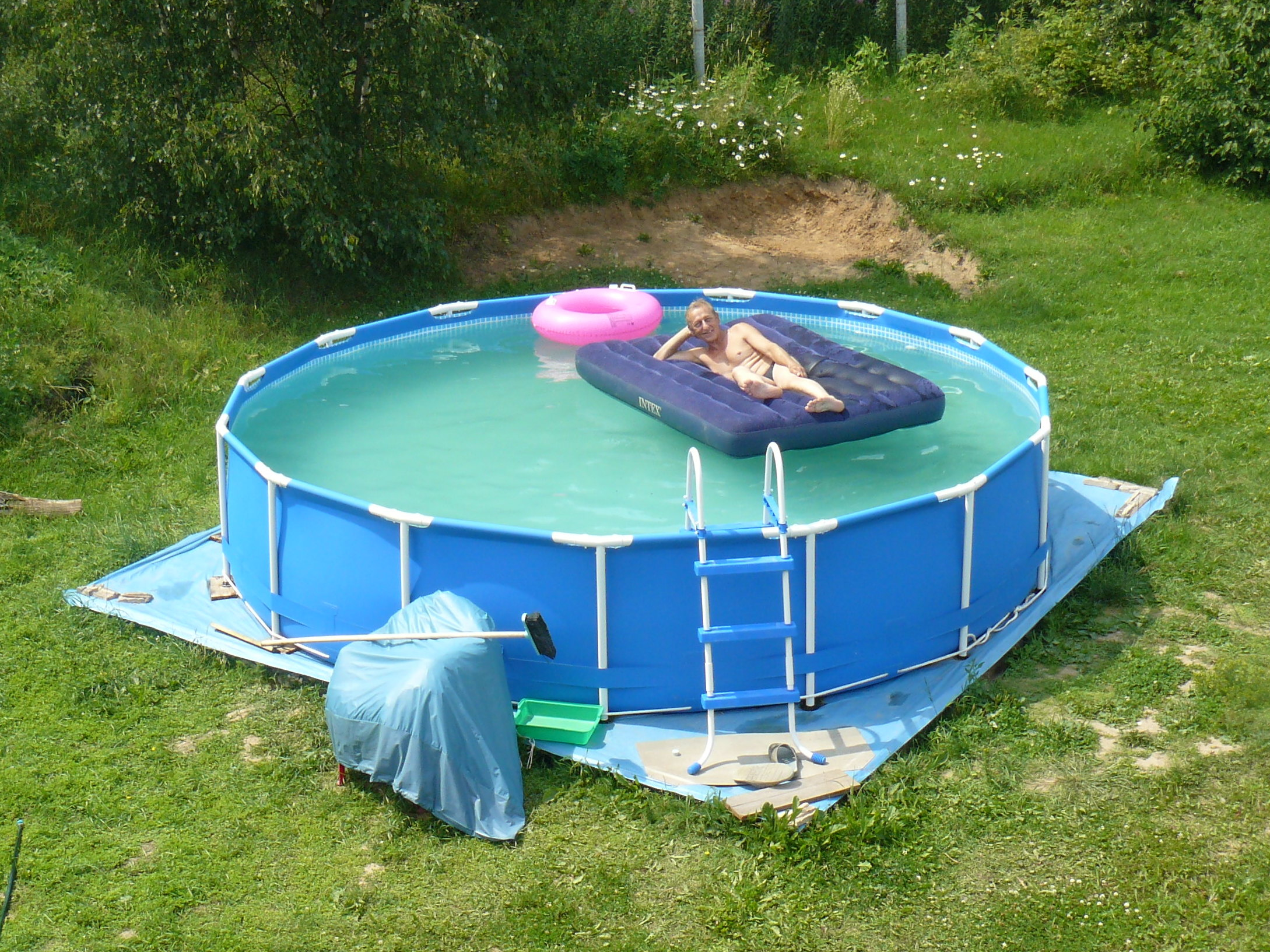
A collapsible above-ground swimming pool

Private pools are usually smaller than public pools. Home pools can be permanently built-in, or be assembled above ground and disassembled after summer. Privately owned outdoor pools in backyards or gardens started to proliferate in the 1950s in regions with warm summer climates, particularly in the United States with desegregation. A plunge pool is a smaller, permanently installed swimming pool.

Construction methods for private pools vary greatly. The main types of in-ground pools are gunite shotcrete, concrete, vinyl-lined, and one-piece fiberglass shells.

Many countries now have strict pool fencing requirements for private swimming pools, which require pool areas to be isolated so that unauthorized children younger than six years cannot enter. Many countries require a similar level of protection for the children residing in or visiting the house, although many pool owners prefer the visual aspect of the pool in close proximity to their living areas, and will not provide this level of protection. There is no consensus between states or countries on the requirements to fence private swimming pools, and in many places they are not required at all, particularly in rural settings.

==== Children's pools ====
Inexpensive temporary polyvinyl chloride pools can be bought in supermarkets and taken down after summer. They are used mostly outdoors in yards, are typically shallow, and often their sides are inflated with air to stay rigid. When finished, the water and air can be let out and this type of pool can be folded up for convenient storage. They are regarded in the swimming pool industry as "splasher" pools intended for cooling off and amusing toddlers and children, not for swimming.

Toys are available for children and other people to play with in pool water. They are often blown up with air so they are soft but still reasonably rugged, and can float in water.

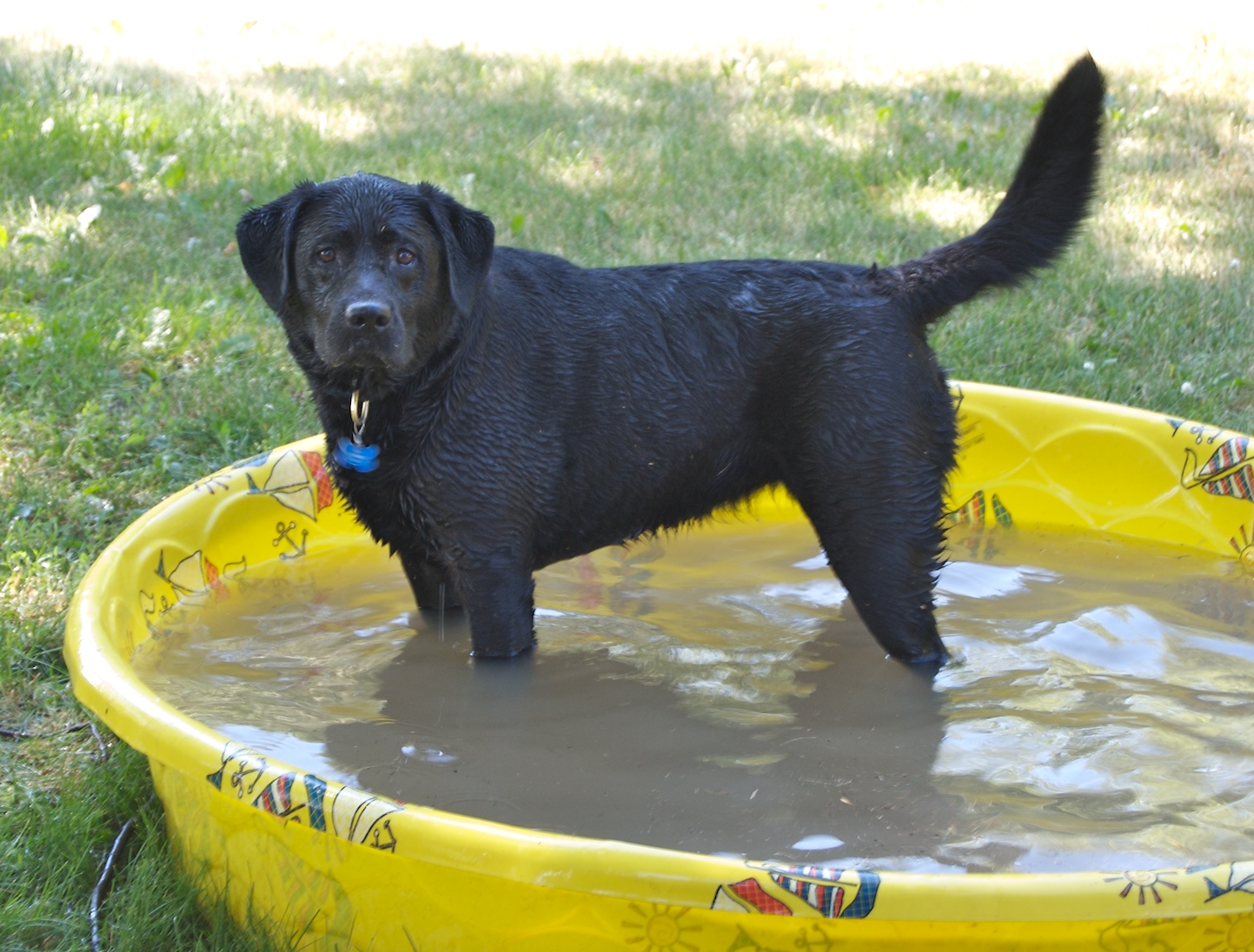
A black Labrador Retriever bathing in a kiddie pool

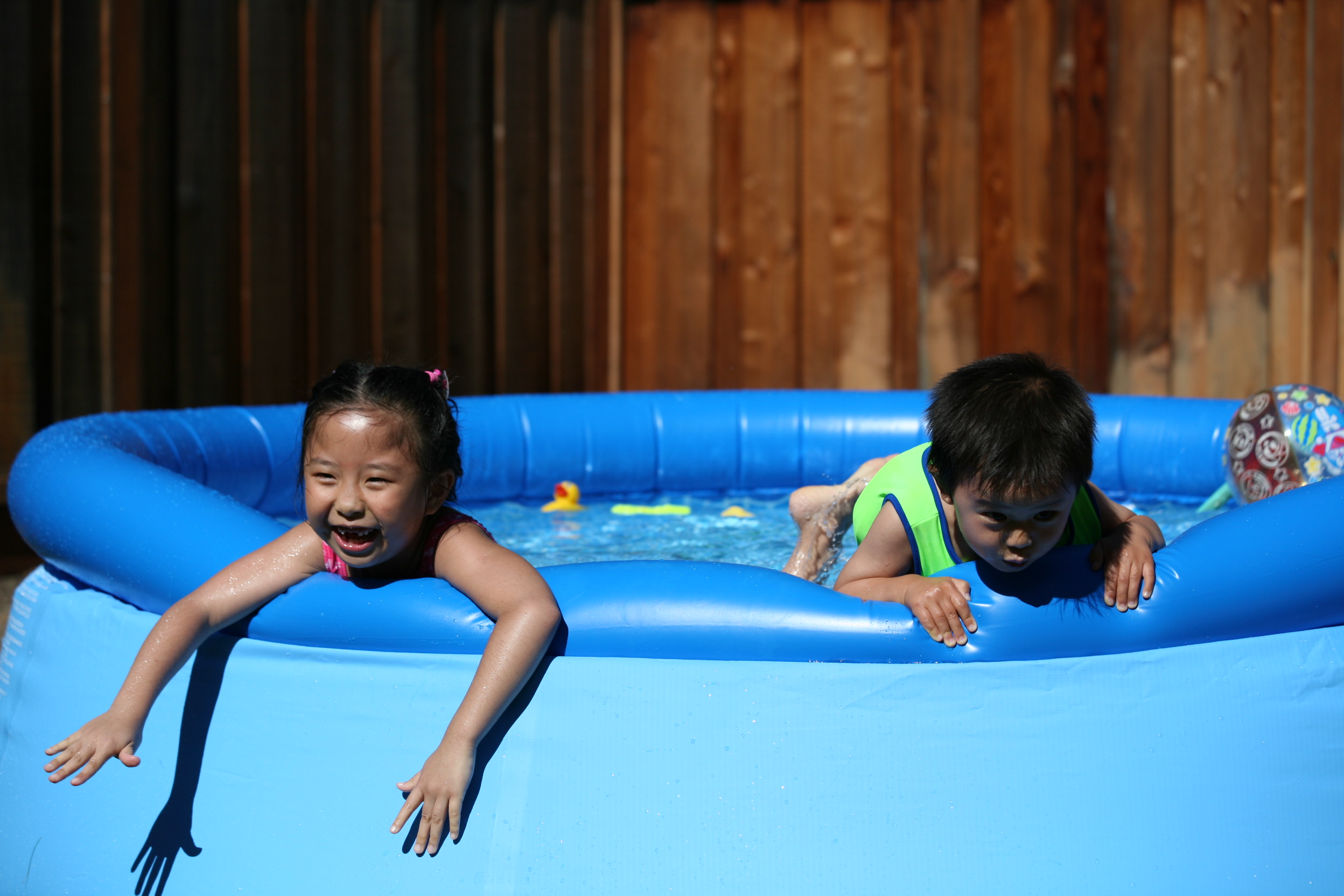
Children playing in an inflatable pool

=== Public pools ===
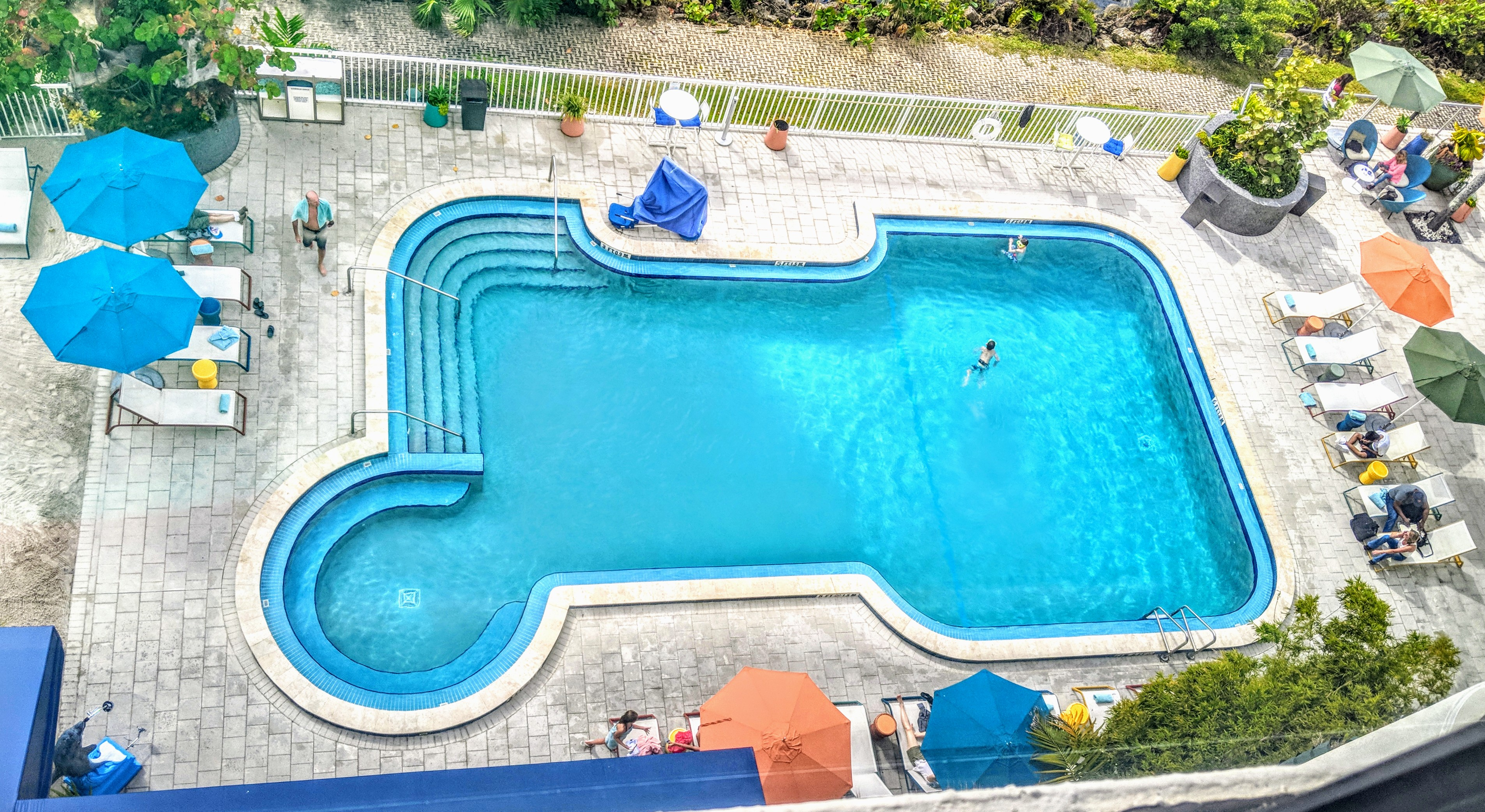
A hotel swimming pool in Miami

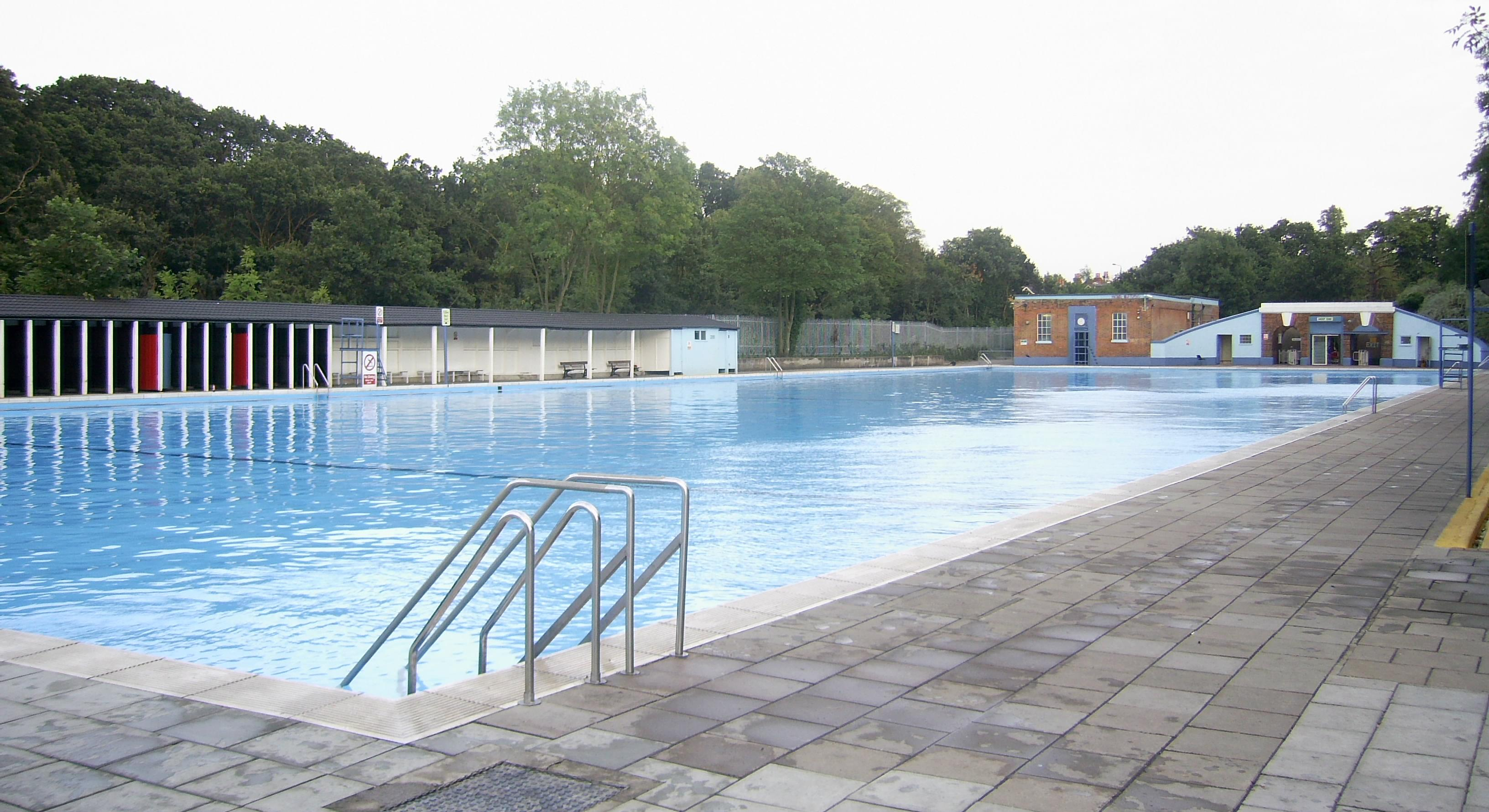
Tooting Bec Lido, in South London

Public pools are often part of a larger leisure center or recreational complex. These centres often have more than one pool, such as an indoor heated pool, an outdoor (chlorinated, saltwater or ozonated) pool which may be heated or unheated, a shallower children's pool, and a paddling pool for toddlers and infants. There may also be a sauna and one or more hot tubs or spa pools ("jacuzzis").

Many upscale hotels and holiday resorts have a swimming pool for use by their guests. If a pool is in a separate building, the building may be called a natatorium. The building may sometimes also have facilities for related activities, such as a diving tank. Larger pools sometimes have a diving board affixed at one edge above the water.

Many public swimming pools are rectangles 25 m or 50 m long, but they can be any size and shape. There are also elaborate pools with artificial waterfalls, fountains, splash pads, wave machines, varying depths of water, bridges, and island bars.

Some swimming facilities have lockers for clothing and other belongings. The lockers can require a coin to be inserted in a slot, either as deposit or payment. There are usually showers – sometimes mandatory – before and/or after swimming. There are often also lifeguards to ensure the safety of users.

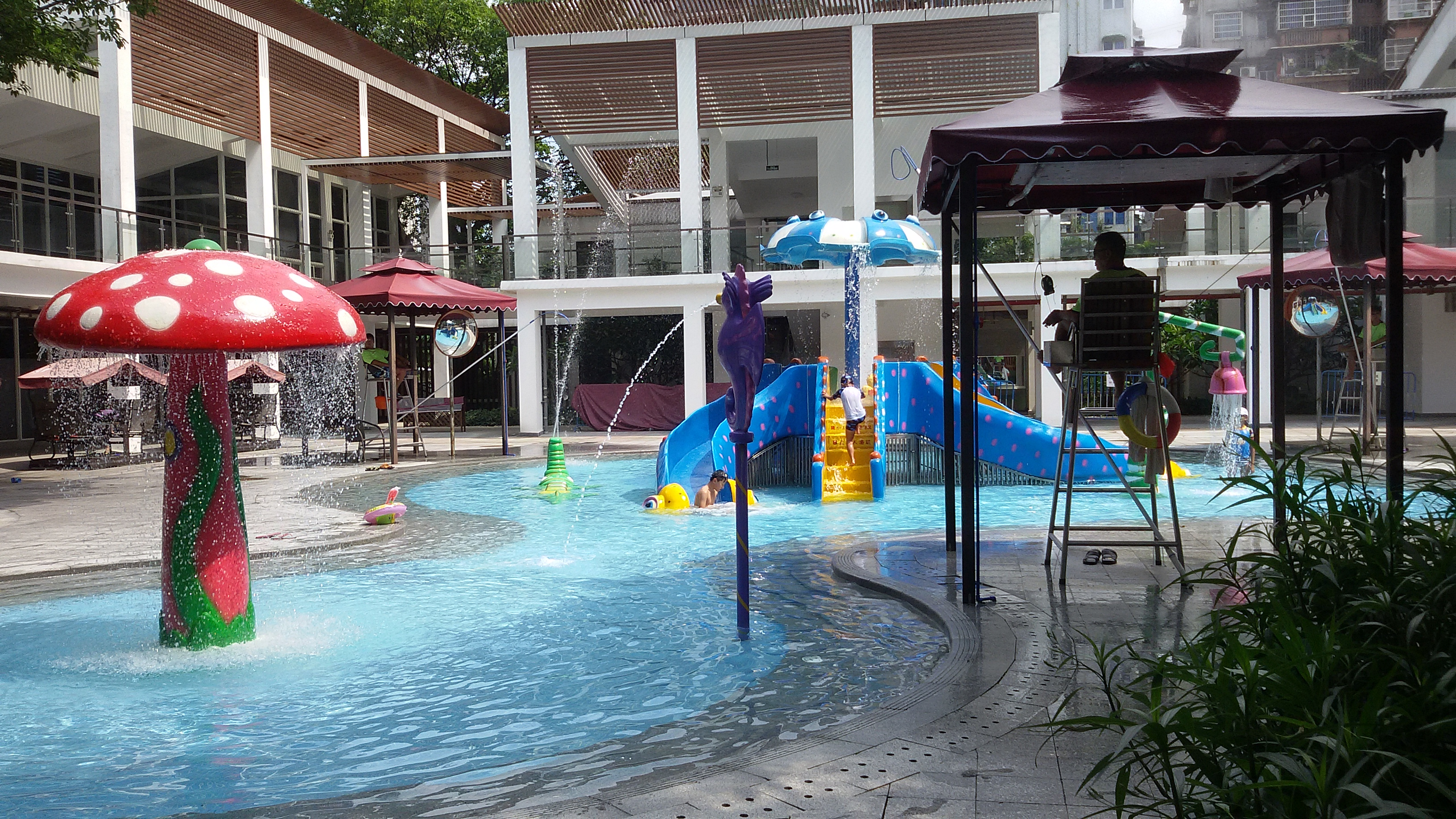
Wading pool at the SaiGaau Swimming Pool

Wading or paddling pools are shallow bodies of water intended for use by small children, usually in parks.

=== Competition pools ===
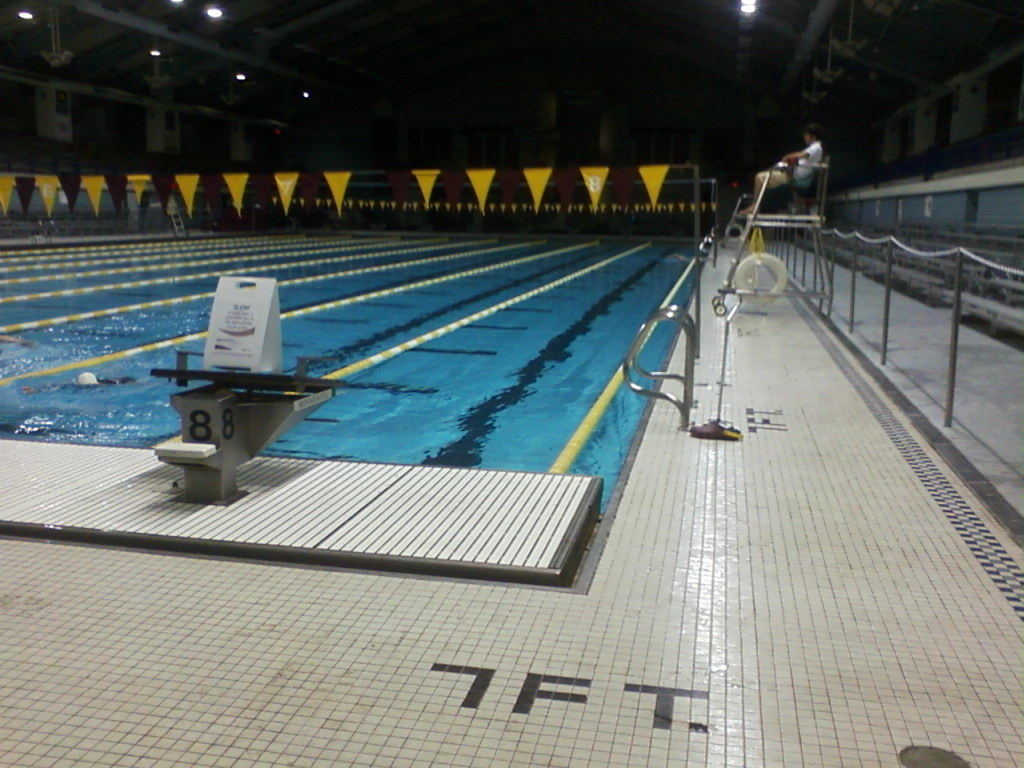
Racing pool at the University of Minnesota

A simplified diagram of the World Aquatics long course swimming pool standard, used at the World Championships and Summer Olympics

World Aquatics sets standards for competition pools: 25 or 50 m (82 or 164 ft) long and at least 1.35 m (4.4 ft) deep. Competition pools are generally indoors and heated to enable their use all year round, and to more easily comply with the regulations regarding temperature, lighting, and automatic officiating equipment.

An Olympic-size swimming pool (first used at the 1924 Olympics) is a pool that meets FINA's additional standards for the Olympic Games and for world championship events. It must be 50 by 25 m (164 by 82 ft) wide, divided into eight lanes of 2.5 m (8.2 ft) each, plus two areas of 2.5 m (8.2 ft) at each side of the pool. Depth must be at least 2 m (6.6 ft).

The water must be kept at 25–28 °C (77–82 °F) and the lighting level at or greater than 1500 lux. There are also regulations for color of lane rope, positioning of backstroke flags (5 metres from each wall), and so on. Pools claimed to be "Olympic pools" do not always meet these regulations, as FINA cannot police use of the term. Touchpads are mounted on both walls for long course meets and each end for short course.

A pool may be referred to as fast or slow, depending on its physical layout. Some design considerations allow the reduction of swimming resistance making the pool faster: namely, proper pool depth, elimination of currents, increased lane width, energy absorbing racing lane lines and gutters, and the use of other innovative hydraulic, acoustic and illumination designs.

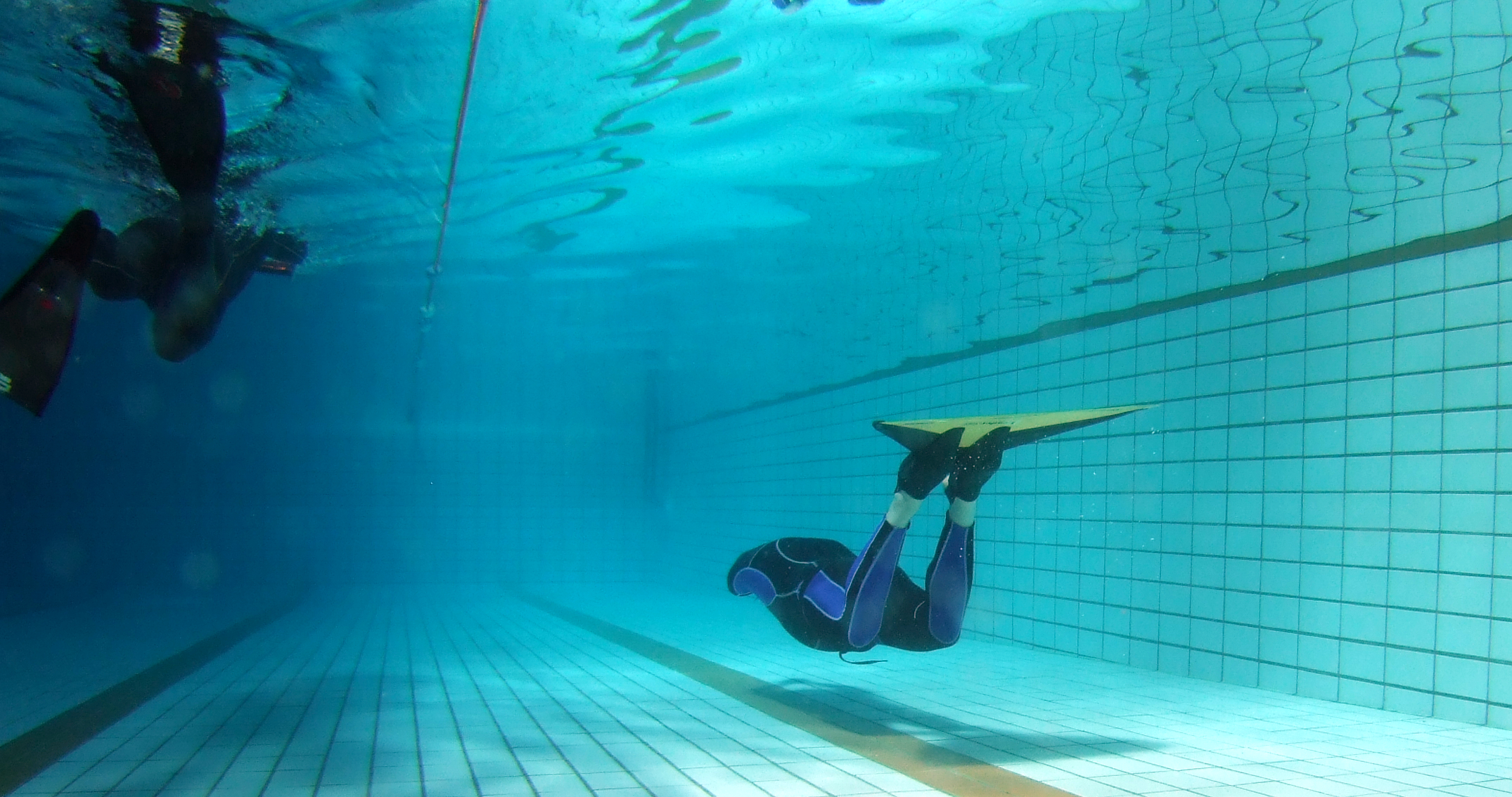
Pool tiles' longer rectangular edges may be parallel to the pool's long sides to help swimmers orient themselves.

=== Exercise pools ===
In the last two decades, a new style of pool has gained popularity. These consist of a small vessel (usually about 2.5 × 5 m) in which the swimmer swims in place, either against the push of an artificially generated water current or against the pull of restraining devices. These pools have several names, such as swim spas, swimming machines, or swim systems. They are all examples of different modes of resistance swimming.

=== Hot tubs and spa pools ===
A home spa

Hot tubs and spa pools are common heated pools used for relaxation and sometimes for therapy. Commercial spas are common in the swimming pool area or sauna area of a health club or fitness center, in men's clubs, women's clubs, motels and exclusive five-star hotel suites. Spa clubs may have very large pools, some segmented into increasing temperatures. In Japan, men's clubs with many spas of different size and temperature are common.

Commercial spas are generally made of concrete, with a mosaic tiled interior. In the early 2000s, with the innovation of the pre-form composite method where mosaic tiles are bonded to the shell this enables commercial spas to be completely factory manufactured to specification and delivered in one piece. Hot tubs are typically made somewhat like a wine barrel with straight sides, from wood such as Californian redwood held in place by metal hoops. Immersion of the head is not recommended in spas or hot tubs due to a potential risk of underwater entrapment from the pump suction forces. However, commercial installations in many countries must comply with various safety standards which reduce this risk considerably.

Home spas are a worldwide retail item in western countries since the 1980s, and are sold in dedicated spa stores, pool shops, department stores, the Internet, and catalog sales books. They are almost always made from heat-extruded acrylic sheet Perspex, often colored in marble look-alike patterns. They rarely exceed 6 m^{2} (65 sq ft) and are typically 1 m (3 ft 3 in) deep, restricted by the availability of the raw sheet sizes (typically manufactured in Japan). There is often a mid-depth seating or lounging system, and contoured lounger style reclining seats are common.

Upmarket spas often include a drinks tray, lights, LCD flat-screen TV sets and other features that make the pool a recreation center. Due to their family-oriented nature, home spas are normally operated from 36 to 39 °C (97 to 102 °F). Many pools are incorporated in a redwood or simulated wood surround, and are termed "portable" as they may be placed on a patio rather than sunken into a permanent location. Some portable spas are shallow and narrow enough to fit sideways through a standard door and be used inside a room. Low power electric immersion heaters are common with home spas.

Whirlpool tubs first became popular in the U.S. during the 1960s and 1970s. A spa is also called a "jacuzzi" there, as the word became a generic after-plumbing component manufacturer; Jacuzzi introduced the "spa whirlpool" in 1968. Air bubbles may be introduced into the nozzles via an air-bleed venturi pump that combines cooler air with the incoming heated water to cool the pool if the temperature rises uncomfortably high. Some spas have a constant stream of bubbles fed via the seating area of the pool, or a footwell area. This is more common as a temperature control device where the heated water comes from a natural (uncontrolled heat) geothermal source, rather than artificially heated.

Water temperature is usually very warm to hot – 38 to 42 °C (100 to 108 °F) – so bathers usually stay in for only 20 to 30 minutes. Bromine or mineral sanitizers are often recommended as sanitizers for spas because chlorine dissipates at a high temperature, thereby heightening its strong chemical smell. Ozone is an effective bactericide and is commonly included in the circulation system with cartridge filtration, but not with sand media filtration due to clogging problems with turbid body fats.

=== Ocean pools ===
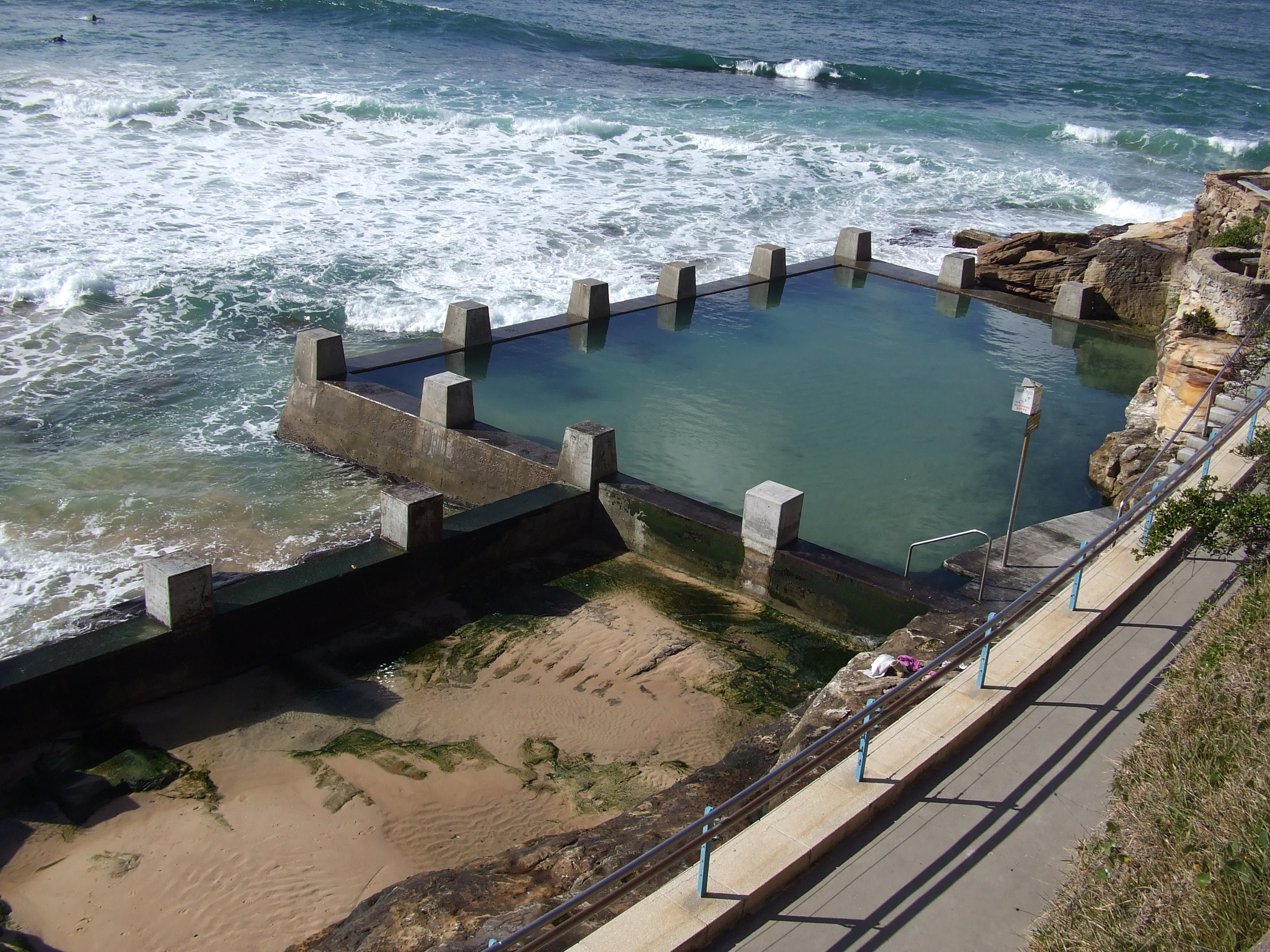
An ocean pool at Coogee in Sydney, Australia

In the early 20th century, especially in Australia, ocean pools were built, typically on headlands by enclosing part of the rock shelf, with water circulated through the pools by flooding from tidal tanks or by regular flooding over the side of the pools at high tide. This continued a pre-European tradition of bathing in rockpools with many of the current sites being expanded from sites used by Aboriginal Australians or early European settlers. Bathing in these pools provided security against both rough surf and sea life. There were often separate pools for women and men, or the pool was open to the sexes at different times with a break for bathers to climb in without fear of observation by the other sex. These were the forerunners of modern "Olympic" pools. A variation was the later development of sea- or harbour-side pools that circulated sea water using pumps. A pool of this type was the training ground for Australian Olympian Dawn Fraser.

There are currently about 100 ocean baths in New South Wales, which can range from small pools roughly 25 metres (82 ft) long and "Olympic Sized" (50 m) to the very large, such as the 50 × 100 m baths in Newcastle. While most are free, a number charge fees, such as the Bondi Icebergs Club pool at Bondi Beach. Despite the development of chlorinated and heated pools, ocean baths remain a popular form of recreation in New South Wales.

=== Infinity pools ===
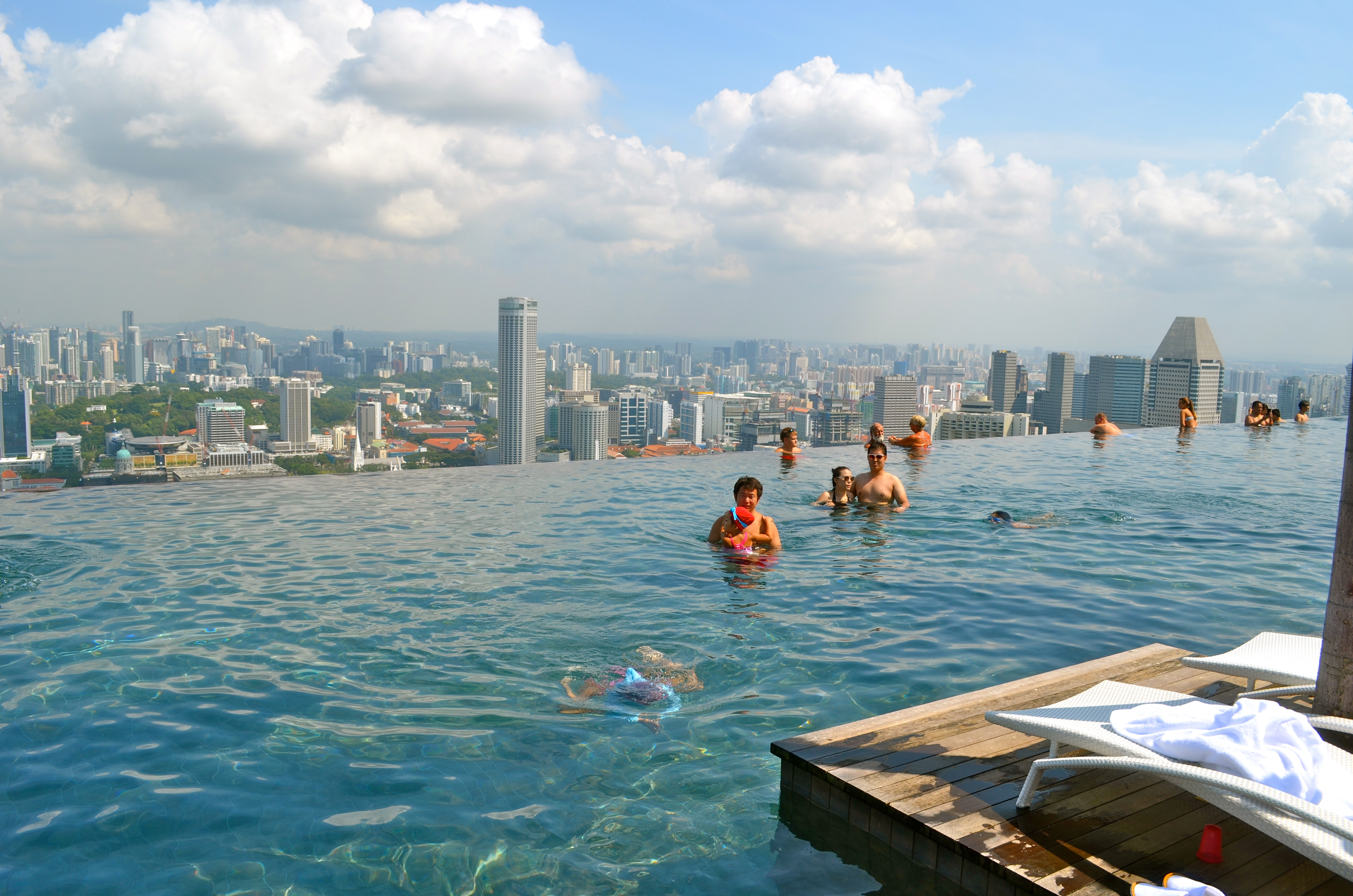
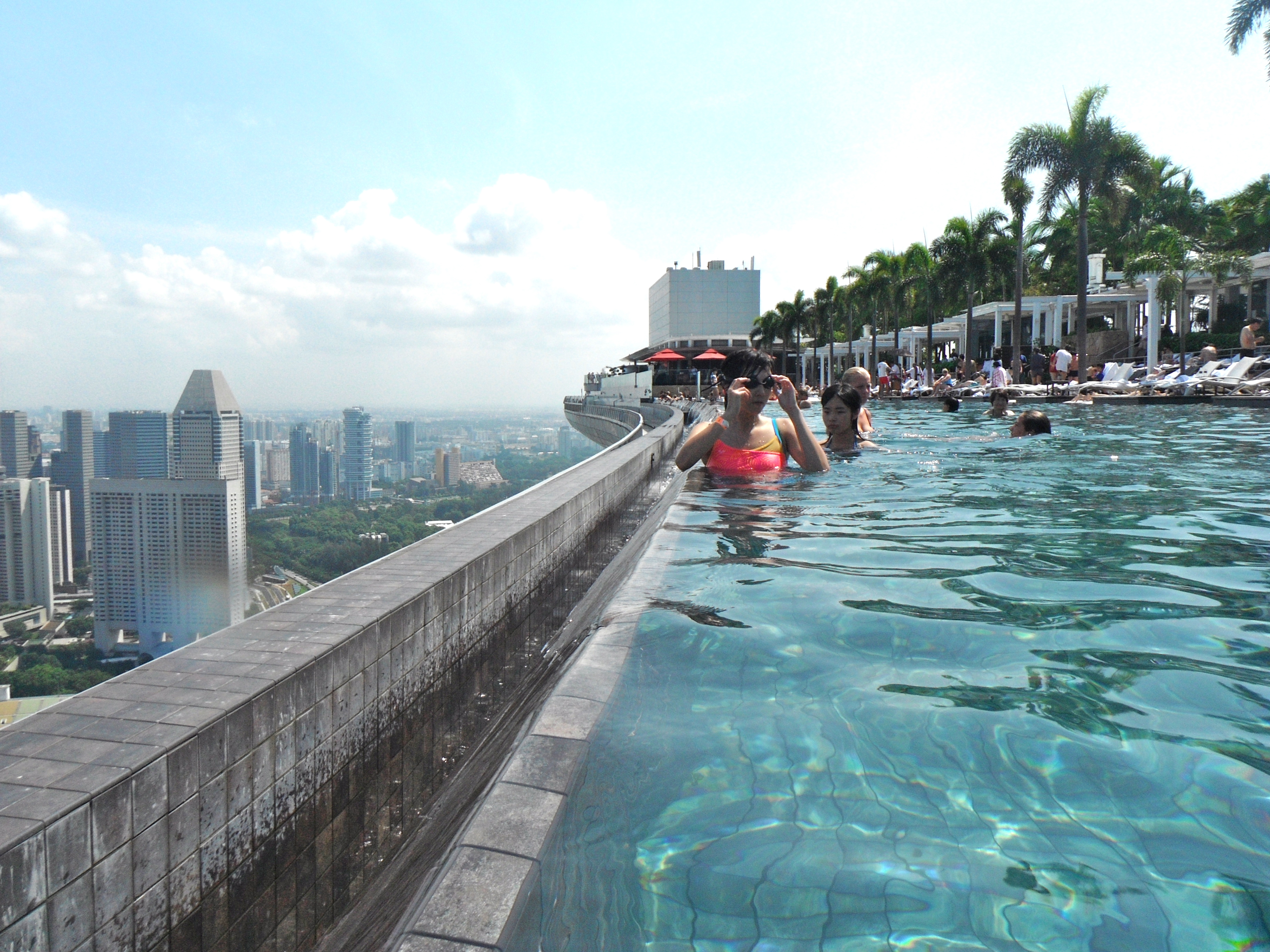
The Marina Bay Sands SkyPark Infinity Pool in Singapore, viewed from the poolside (left) and near the edge (right)

An infinity pool (also named negative edge or vanishing edge pool) is a swimming pool which produces a visual effect of water extending to the horizon, vanishing, or extending to "infinity". Often, the water appears, from the perspective of the swimmer, to fall into an ocean, lake, bay, or other similar body of water.

=== Natural swimming pools and ponds ===
Natural swimming pools were developed in central and western Europe in the early and mid-1980s by designers and landscape architects with environmental concerns. They have recently been growing in popularity as an alternative to traditional swimming pools. Natural swimming pools are constructed bodies of water in which no chemicals or devices that disinfect or sterilize water are used, and all the cleaning of the pool is achieved purely with the motion of the water through biological filters and plants rooted hydroponically in the system. In essence, natural swimming pools seek to recreate swimming holes and swimmable lakes, the environment where people feel safe swimming in a non-polluted, healthy, and ecologically balanced body of water.

=== Zero-entry swimming pools ===
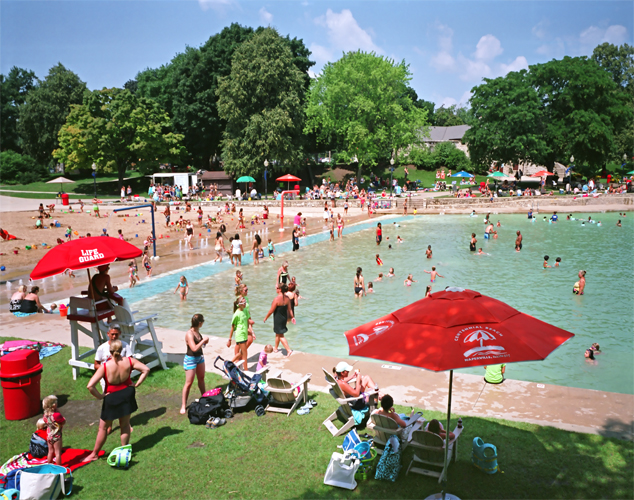
Zero-depth entry at the Centennial Beach aquatic park in Naperville, Illinois, United States

A zero-entry swimming pool, also called a beach entry swimming pool, has an edge or entry that gradually slopes from the deck into the water, becoming deeper with each step, in the manner of a natural beach. As there are no stairs or ladders to navigate, this type of entry assists older people, young children and people with accessibility problems (e.g., people with a physical disability) where gradual entry is useful.

==== ADA requirements ====
Beginning in 2012, standards for accessible design were put into effect by the Americans with Disabilities Act (ADA) that require at least two modes of accessible entry in large sized swimming pools. A zero-entry swimming pool is in accordance with the standards.

The requirements addressed the inequalities of swimming efficiency, effectiveness, and satisfaction experienced by people with physical disabilities. They also create equality of access to a physical activity with multiple benefits. Research suggests that swimming can be therapeutic and induces healthier physical and mental states.

=== Indoor pools ===
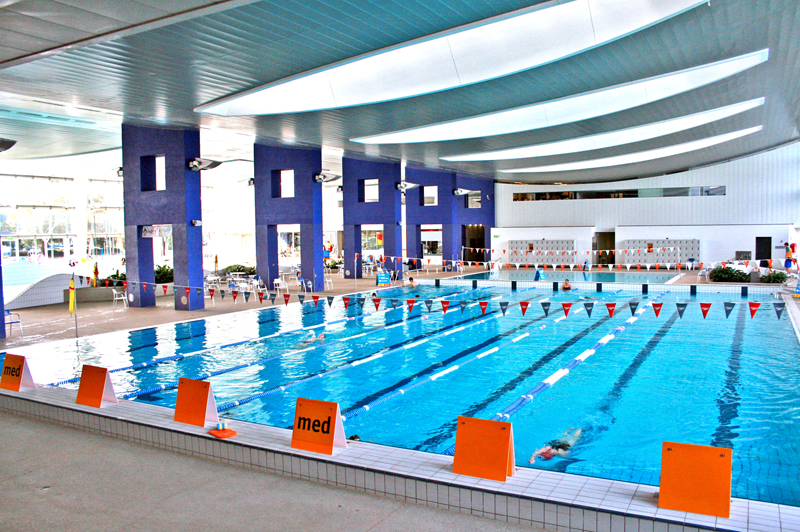
Indoor swimming pool

Once known as "natatoriums", indoor pools are located inside a building with a roof and are insulated by at least three walls. Built for year-round swimming or training, they are found in all climate types. Since the buildings around indoor pools are insulated, heat escapes much less, making it less expensive to heat indoor pools than outdoor pools (all of whose heat escapes).

Some colleges, universities, and high schools have buildings that use the term "natatorium" in their names, especially when the building houses more than just a swimming pool, for example a diving well or facilities for water polo. The word natatorium was borrowed from Late Latin "place for swimming" into English in New England in 1890.

=== Suspended swimming pool ===
This type of swimming pool is suspended high above the ground. A prominent example is the Sky Pool in London's Embassy Gardens, the world's first floating pool.

== Other uses ==
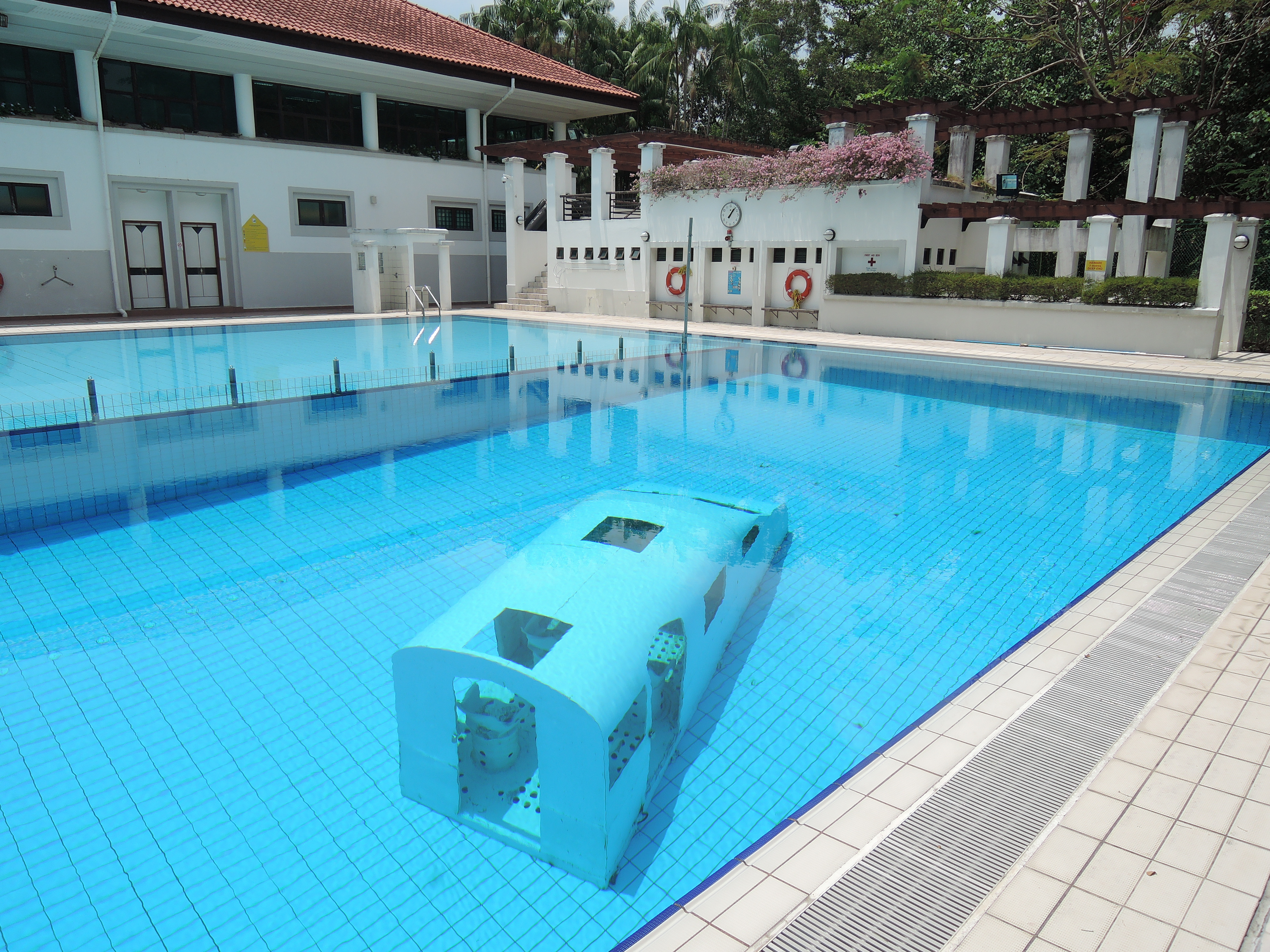
Singapore Aviation Academy training pool for rescuing people on board aircraft in case of ditching

Swimming pools are also used for events such as synchronized swimming, water polo, canoe polo and underwater sports such as underwater hockey, underwater rugby, finswimming and sport diving as well as for teaching diving, lifesaving and scuba diving techniques. They have also been used for specialist tasks such as teaching water-ditching survival techniques for aircraft and submarine crews and astronaut training. In some instances slope-sided, irregular swimming pools, such as the Nude Bowl, have been drained of water and used for skateboarding.

== Sanitation ==
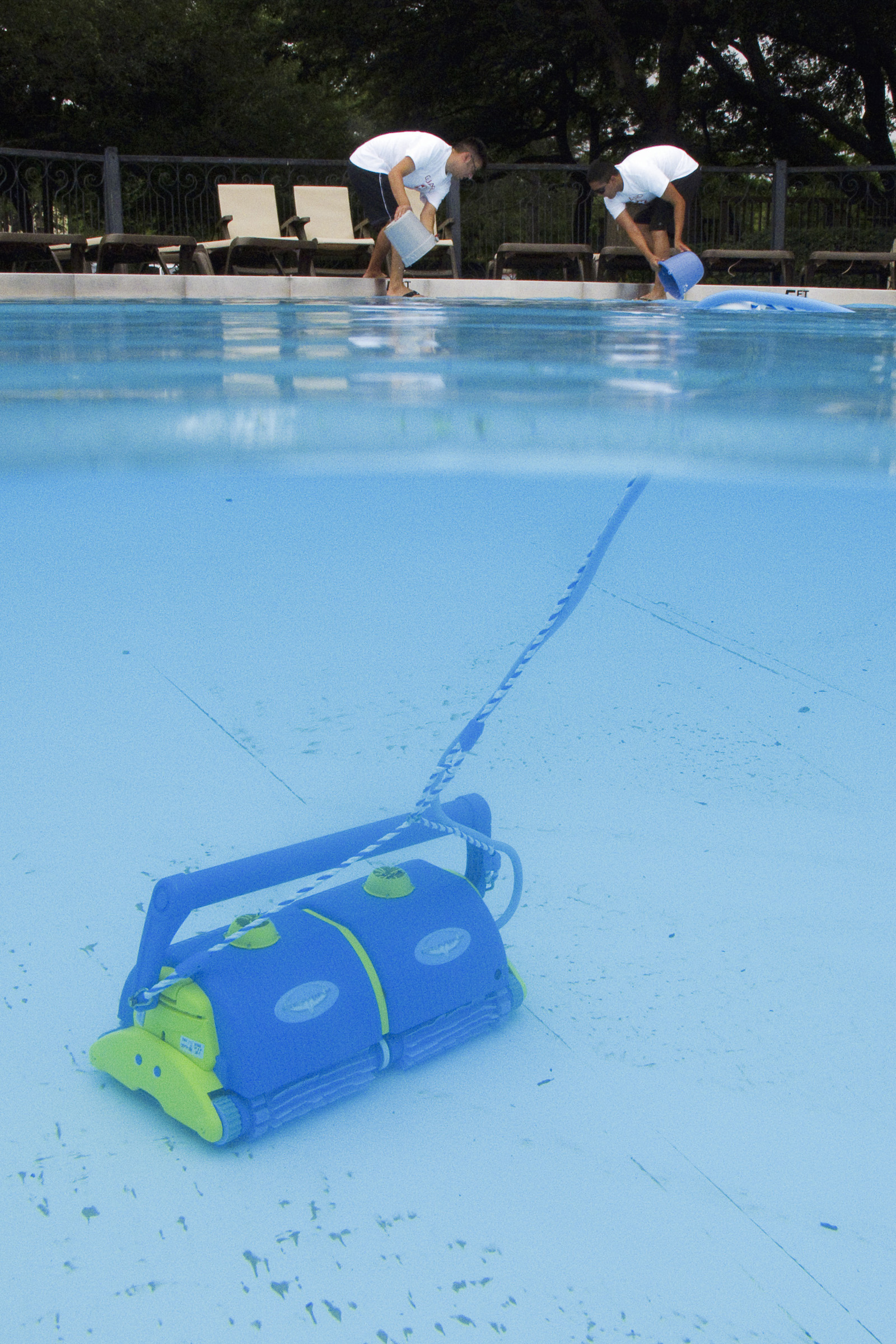
Automated pool cleaner

Levels of bacteria and viruses in swimming pool water must be kept low to prevent the spread of diseases and pathogens. Bacteria, algae and insect larvae can breed in the pool if water is not properly sanitized. Pumps, mechanical sand filters, and disinfectants are often used to sanitise the water.

Chemical disinfectants, such as chlorine (usually as a hypochlorite salt, such as calcium hypochlorite) and bromine, are commonly used to kill pathogens. If not properly maintained, chemical sanitation can produce high levels of disinfection byproducts. Sanitized swimming pool water can appear green if a certain amount of iodine, iron salts, or copper chloride are present in the water.

Acesulfame potassium has been used to estimate how much urine is discharged by swimmers into a pool. A Canadian study estimated that swimmers had released 75 litres of urine into a large pool that had about 830,000 litres of water and was a third of the size of an Olympic-size pool. Hot tubs were found to have higher readings of the marker. While urine itself is relatively harmless, its degradation products may lead to asthma.

== Safety ==
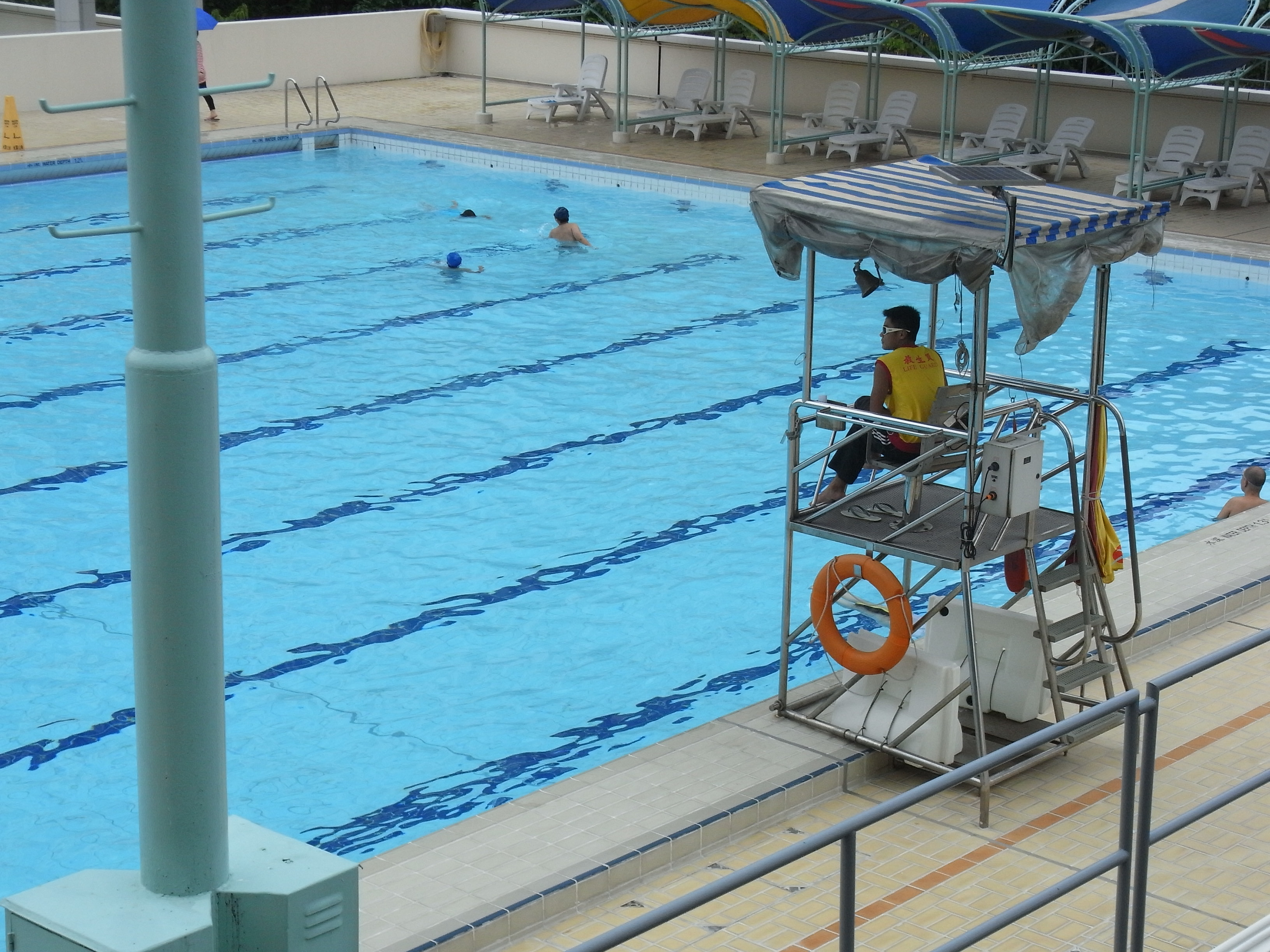
Lifeguard at a Hong Kong swimming pool

Pools pose a risk of drowning, which may be significant for swimmers who are inexperienced, suffer from seizures, have a heart condition, or have autism. Drowning risk is increased for young children. Males drown more frequently than females. Lifeguards are employed at most pools to execute water rescues and administer first aid as needed in order to reduce this risk.

Diving in shallow areas of a pool may also lead to significant head and neck injuries; diving, especially head-first diving, should be done in the deepest point of the pool. Different organizations have different minimum requirements on safe pool depth for diving. The American Red Cross recommends a minimum depth of 9 feet, while the Department of Health of the New York state prohibits diving in less than 8 feet of water. Olympic diving pools for diving from up to 10 metres (33 ft) must comply with the World Aquatics' guidelines, which require the pool to be 5 metres (16 ft) deep.

In regions where residential pools are common, drowning is a major cause of childhood death. An article by the CDC states that a majority of drownings of children ages one to four occur in swimming pools. As a precaution, many jurisdictions require that residential pools be enclosed with fencing to restrict unauthorized access. Many products exist, such as removable baby fences. The evidence for floating alarms and window/door alarms to reduce the risk of drowning is poor.

"Slip and fall" injuries can occur on the surfaces surrounding swimming pools if the surfaces are not made with non-skid materials. Running is also prohibited as it can contribute to this.

== See also ==
- Bather load – Capacity of a swimming pool or water fountain
- Lido (swimming pool) – Public outdoor swimming pool
- List of water games
- Neutral buoyancy pool – Pool of water in which neutral buoyancy is used to train astronauts
- Pool noodle – Foam pool toy
- Respiratory risks of indoor swimming pools
- Swimming pool service technician – Person who maintains swimming pools
- Uniform Swimming Pool, Spa and Hot Tub Code
- Urine-indicator dye – Urban legend
