= Bather load =

Capacity of a swimming pool or water fountain

Bather load refers to the capacity of a municipal swimming pool, a water fountain, or similar facility. Often bather load is dictated by the capacity of water treatment equipment (filters, chemical processing, and the like). Facilities intended only for decoration (i.e. not intended to support a bather load) must maintain a certain minimum standard of water quality, since children often play in, or drink from them.

Bather load can be defined as the number of bathers using the pool in a 24-hour period. A certain per-capita capacity for bather load is often considered. For example, on a hot summer day, it is desired that there be reasonable capacity in waterplay areas, bathing fountains, and municipal swimming baths, to accommodate the population of potential bathers. Such percentage is expressed as the BLPP (Bather Load as a Percentage of Population).

== See also ==
- Bathing
