= National Swimming Pool Foundation =

- Type: 501(c)(3)
- Founded: 1965; 61 years ago
- Fate: Merged
- Successor: Pool & Hot Tub Alliance
- Headquarters: United States
- Website: www.nspf.org

The National Swimming Pool Foundation (NSPF) was a United States 501(c)(3) non-profit organization, mostly known for selling the Certified Pool Operator certifications, among many other less known products.

== Overview ==
The Certified Pool Operator certification is a credential that could be considered a quasi license to professionally care for and maintain swimming pools in recreational water environments.

In 2019, the NSPF completed a merger with the Association of Pool & Spa Professionals (APSP), founding the Pool & Hot Tub Alliance (PHTA).

== Background ==
NSPF was primarily a publishing company; which sells books and online courses through over 1,000 instructors. In 2003, Tom Lachocki was named as the APSP CEO.

Though, for many years, the Certified Pool Operator certification was the only certification for someone wishing to work in the pool industry, the CDC now recognizes at least seven similar pool operations courses.

== See also ==
- American Swimming Coaches Association
