= List of compounds with carbon number 2 =

This is a partial list of molecules that contain 2 carbon atoms.

Chemical formula	Synonyms	CAS number
C_{2}Al	monoaluminum dicarbide	37297-57-7
C_{2}Al_{2}	dialuminum dicarbide	12122-01-9
C_{2}B	boron dicarbide	12539-98-9
C_{2}Be	beryllium dicarbide	12070-28-9
C_{2}BrCl	bromochloroacetylene	25604-70-0
C_{2}BrClF_{2}O	bromodifluoroacetylchloride	3832-48-2
C_{2}BrCl_{5}	bromopentachloroethane	79504-02-2
C_{2}BrF_{5}	bromopentafluoroethane	354-55-2
C_{2}Br_{2}FN	dibromo fluoroacetonitrile	6698-74-4
C_{2}Br_{2}N_{2}O_{2}	dibromofuroxan	70134-71-3
C_{2}Br_{2}O_{2}	oxalyl bromide	15219-34-8
C_{2}Br_{6}	hexabromoethane	594-73-0
C_{2}Ca	calcium carbide	75-20-7
C_{2}Ce	cerium dicarbide	12012-32-7
C_{2}CeRh	cerium rhodium dicarbide	53262-56-9
C_{2}Cl_{2}F_{2}	dichlorodifluoroethylene	27156-03-2
C_{2}Cl_{2}O_{2}	oxalyl chloride	79-37-8
C_{2}Cl_{3}N	trichloroacetonitrile	108-77-0
C_{2}Cl_{4}	tetrachloroethylene	127-18-4
C_{2}Cl_{4}O	trichloroacetyl chloride	76-02-8
C_{2}Cl_{4}O_{2}	trichloromethyl chloroformate	503-38-8
C_{2}Cl_{5}F	pentachlorofluoroethane	354-56-3
C_{2}CoNO_{3}	cobalt dicarbonyl nitrosyl	61332-94-3
C_{2}Dy	dysprosium dicarbide	12175-80-3
C_{2}Er	erbium dicarbide	12192-37-9
C_{2}Eu	europium dicarbide	12127-44-5
C_{2}FN_{5}O_{10}	fluoropentanitroethane	23072-51-7
C_{2}F_{2}O_{2}	oxalyl fluoride	359-40-0
C_{2}F_{3}	trifluorovinyl radical	4605-17-8
C_{2}F_{3}I	iodotrifluoroethylene	359-37-5
C_{2}F_{3}N	trifluoromethylisocyanide	105879-13-8
C_{2}F_{5}	pentafluoro ethyl radical	3369-48-0
C_{2}F_{5}I	pentafluoroethyliodide	354-64-3
C_{2}F_{6}O_{5}S_{2}	trifluoromethanesulfonic anhydride	358-23-6
C_{2}F_{7}N	perfluoroethanamine	354-80-3
C_{2}H	ethynyl radical	2122-48-7
C_{2}HBrClF_{3}	halothane	151-67-7
C_{2}HBrO	bromoketene	78957-22-9
C_{2}HBr_{2}FO_{2}	dibromofluoroacetic acid	353-99-1
C_{2}HBr_{3}	tribromoethene	598-16-3
C_{2}HBr_{3}O_{2}	tribromoacetic acid	75-96-7
C_{2}HClO	chloroketene	29804-89-5
C_{2}HCl_{3}	trichloroethylene	79-01-6
C_{2}HCl_{3}O	chloral	75-87-6
C_{2}HF_{3}OS	trifluorothiolacetic acid	2925-25-9
C_{2}HF_{5}O	pentafluorodimethyl ether	3822-68-2
C_{2}HNO	formyl cyanide	4471-47-0
C_{2}HO	ethynyloxy radical	51095-15-9
C_{2}H_{2}	acetylene	74-86-2
C_{2}H_{2}AsCl_{3}	lewisite	541-25-3
C_{2}H_{2}BrClO	bromoacetyl chloride	22118-09-8
C_{2}H_{2}Br_{2}O	bromoacetyl bromide	598-21-0
C_{2}H_{2}Br_{2}O_{2}	dibromoethanoic acid	631-64-1
C_{2}H_{2}Cl_{2}	dichloromethane	75-09-2
C_{2}H_{2}ClF_{2}NO	chlorodifluoroacetamide	354-28-9
C_{2}H_{2}ClNS	chloromethyl thiocyanate	3268-79-9
C_{2}H_{2}Cl_{2}O	dichloroacetaldehyde	79-02-7
C_{2}H_{2}FN	fluoroacetonitrile	503-20-8
C_{2}H_{2}F_{2}O_{2}	difluoroacetic acid	381-73-7
C_{2}H_{2}IN	iodoacetonitrile	624-75-9
C_{2}H_{2}N	cyanomethyl radical	2932-82-3
C_{2}H_{2}O	ethynol	32038-79-2
C_{2}H_{2}O	ethenone	463-51-4
C_{2}H_{2}O	oxirene	157-18-6
C_{2}H_{2}OS	ethynesulfenic acid	121564-25-8
C_{2}H_{2}O_{2}	glyoxal	107-22-2
C_{2}H_{2}O_{3}	formic acid anhydride	1558-67-4
C_{2}H_{2}O_{4}	oxalic acid	144-62-7
C_{2}H_{2}O_{8}Pb_{3}	basic lead carbonate	1319-46-6
C_{2}H_{2}S	thioketene	18282-77-4
C_{2}H_{2}Se	selenoketene	61134-37-0
C_{2}H_{3}	vinyl radical	2669-89-8
C_{2}H_{3}BF_{2}	vinyldifluoroborane	358-95-2
C_{2}H_{3}BrO	acetyl bromide	506-96-7
C_{2}H_{3}Br_{3}O_{2}	bromal hydrate	507-42-6
C_{2}H_{3}Cl	methylchlorocarbene	31304-51-5
C_{2}H_{3}ClO	acetyl chloride	75-36-5
C_{2}H_{3}ClO_{2}S	methoxycarbonylsulfenyl chloride	26555-40-8
C_{2}H_{3}Cl_{3}O_{2}	chloral hydrate	302-17-0
C_{2}H_{3}FO	acetyl fluoride	557-99-3
C_{2}H_{3}F_{2}NO	difluoroacetamide	359-38-6
C_{2}H_{3}F_{3}O_{2}Si	silyl trifluoroacetate	6876-44-4
C_{2}H_{3}F_{3}S_{2}	methyl trifluoromethyl disulfide	14410-21-0
C_{2}H_{3}IO	acetyl iodide	507-02-8
C_{2}H_{3}KO_{2}	potassium acetate	127-08-2
C_{2}H_{3}N	acetonitrile	75-05-8
C_{2}H_{3}NO	methylcyanate	1768-34-9
C_{2}H_{3}NO	nitrosoethylene	54680-52-3
C_{2}H_{3}NO_{2}	nitroethene	500016-67-1
C_{2}H_{3}NO_{2}	nitroethylene	3638-64-0
C_{2}H_{3}NO_{3}	oxamic acid	471-47-6
C_{2}H_{3}NO_{4}	acetyl nitrate	591-09-3
C_{2}H_{3}NSe	methyl isoselenocyanate	4426-70-4
C_{2}H_{3}NSe	methyl selenocyanate	2179-80-8
C_{2}H_{3}NaO_{2}	sodium ethanoate	127-09-3
C_{2}H_{3}O	acetyl radical	3170-69-2
C_{2}H_{3}O	oxiranyl radical	31586-84-2
C_{2}H_{3}O	vinyloxy radical	6912-06-7
C_{2}H_{3}O_{2}Tl	thallium acetate	563-68-8
C_{2}H_{4}	ethylene	74-85-1
C_{2}H_{4}ClO_{2}P	ethylene chlorophosphite	822-39-9
C_{2}H_{4}Cl_{2}	dichloroethane	1300-21-6
C_{2}H_{4}F_{2}O	difluoroethanol	359-13-7
C_{2}H_{4}N_{2}O_{2}	oxalamide	471-46-5
C_{2}H_{4}N_{2}O_{4}	dihydroxyglyoxime	1687-60-1
C_{2}H_{4}N_{2}S_{2}	ethanedithioamide	79-40-3
C_{2}H_{4}N_{4}	dicyanodiamide	461-58-5
C_{2}H_{4}N_{4}O_{2}	diazenedicarboxamide	123-77-3
C_{2}H_{4}O	acetaldehyde	75-07-0
C_{2}H_{4}O	ethenol	557-75-5
C_{2}H_{4}O	ethylene oxide	75-21-8
C_{2}H_{4}OS	ethanethioic acid	507-09-5
C_{2}H_{4}OS	ethenesulfenic acid	2492-74-2
C_{2}H_{4}O_{2}	acetic acid	64-19-7
C_{2}H_{4}O_{2}	1,2-dioxetane	6788-84-7
C_{2}H_{4}O_{2}	formaldehyde dimer	61233-19-0
C_{2}H_{4}O_{2}	methyl formate	107-31-3
C_{2}H_{4}O_{2}	glycolaldehyde	141-46-8
C_{2}H_{4}O_{3}	ethaneperoxoic acid	79-21-0
C_{2}H_{4}O_{3}	monomethyl carbonate	7456-87-3
C_{2}H_{4}O_{4}	formic acid dimer	14523-98-9
C_{2}H_{4}S	thiirane	420-12-2
C_{2}H_{4}S	thioacetaldehyde	6851-93-0
C_{2}H_{4}Se	selenoacetaldehyde	67281-48-5
C_{2}H_{4}Se_{3}	triselenothane	121400-83-7
C_{2}H_{5}	ethyl radical	2025-56-1
C_{2}H_{5}BCl_{2}	ethyldichloroborane	1739-53-3
C_{2}H_{5}BF_{2}	ethylidifluoroborane	430-41-1
C_{2}H_{5}BrHg	ethylmercuric bromide	107-26-6
C_{2}H_{6}Hg	dimethylmercury	593-74-8
C_{2}H_{5}BrO	bromomethyl methyl ether	13057-17-5
C_{2}H_{5}Cl	ethyl chloride	75-00-3
C_{2}H_{5}ClN_{2}O	chloroacetyl hydrazine	30956-28-6
C_{2}H_{5}ClO	ethyl hypochlorite	624-85-1
C_{2}H_{5}ClO_{2}S	ethanesulfonyl chloride	594-44-5
C_{2}H_{5}ClS	chloromethylmethyl sulfide	2373-51-5
C_{2}H_{5}Cl_{2}O_{2}P	ethyl dichlorophosphate	1498-51-7
C_{2}H_{5}Cl_{2}P	ethyldichlorophosphine	1498-40-4
C_{2}H_{5}Cl_{2}PSe	ethylphosphonoselenoic dichloride	14705-46-5
C_{2}H_{5}Cl_{3}Si	ethyltrichlorosilane	115-21-9
C_{2}H_{5}FO	methoxymethyl fluoride	460-22-0
C_{2}H_{5}FO_{2}S	ethane sulfonyl fluoride	754-03-0
C_{2}H_{5}HgI	ethylmercuric iodide	2440-42-8
C_{2}H_{5}I	iodoethane	75-03-6
C_{2}H_{5}IO	iodomethyl methyl ether	13057-19-7
C_{2}H_{5}IS	iodomethyl methyl sulfide	43034-68-0
C_{2}H_{5}Li	ethyl lithium	811-49-4
C_{2}H_{5}N	acetaldimine	20729-41-3
C_{2}H_{5}N	ethenamine	593-67-9
C_{2}H_{5}N	ethylenimine	151-56-4
C_{2}H_{5}NO	acetaldoxime	107-29-9
C_{2}H_{5}NO	acetamide	60-35-5
C_{2}H_{5}NO	nitrosoethane	925-91-7
C_{2}H_{5}NOS	aminothioacetic acid	758-10-1
C_{2}H_{5}NO_{2}	glycine	56-40-6
C_{2}H_{5}NO_{2}	glycolamide	598-42-5
C_{2}H_{5}NO_{2}S	vinylsulfonamide	2386-58-5
C_{2}H_{5}NO_{4}	ammonium acid oxalate	5972-72-5
C_{2}H_{5}NS	ethanethioamide	62-55-5
C_{2}H_{5}N_{3}O_{2}	imidodicarbonic diamide	108-19-0
C_{2}H_{5}O	ethoxy radical	2154-50-9
C_{2}H_{5}P	phosphirane	6569-82-0
C_{2}H_{5}P	vinyl phosphine	58436-39-8
C_{2}H_{5}PS_{2}	phosphenodithioic ethane	41391-49-5
C_{2}H_{5}S	methylthiomethyl radical	31533-72-9
C_{2}H_{6}	ethane	74-84-0
C_{2}H_{6}AlCl	dimethylaluminum chloride	1184-58-3
C_{2}H_{6}AsBr	dimethylarsine bromide	676-71-1
C_{2}H_{6}AsCl	chlorodimethylarsine	557-89-1
C_{2}H_{6}BBr	dimethylboron bromide	5158-50-9
C_{2}H_{6}BCl	chlorodimethylborane	1803-36-7
C_{2}H_{6}BClFN	dimethylaminofluorochloroborane	38481-07-1
C_{2}H_{6}BClO_{2}	chlorodimethoxyborane	868-81-5
C_{2}H_{6}BFO_{2}	fluorodimethoxyborane	367-46-4
C_{2}H_{6}Be	dimethylberyllium	506-63-8
C_{2}H_{6}ClOP	dimethylphosphinic chloride	1111-92-8
C_{2}H_{6}ClO_{2}P	dimethylchlorophosphite	3743-07-5
C_{2}H_{6}ClPS	dimethylphosphinothioic chloride	993-12-4
C_{2}H_{6}Cl_{2}Ge	dimethylgermanium dichloride	1529-48-2
C_{2}H_{6}Cl_{2}Si	ethyldichlorosilane	1789-58-8
C_{2}H_{6}FO_{2}P	methyl methylphosphonofluoridate	353-88-8
C_{2}H_{6}FP	dimethyl fluorophosphine	507-15-3
C_{2}H_{6}F_{3}NS	dimethylaminosulfur trifluoride	3880-03-3
C_{2}H_{6}GeO	dimethylgermanone	5061-27-8
C_{2}H_{6}GeS	dimethylgermathione	16090-49-6
C_{2}H_{6}N	dimethyl amidogen	15337-44-7
C_{2}H_{6}N_{2}O_{2}	ethylnitramine	19091-98-6
C_{2}H_{6}N_{2}O_{4}	hydrazinium hydrogen oxalate	20321-02-2
C_{2}H_{6}O	dimethyl ether	115-10-6
C_{2}H_{6}O	ethanol	64-17-5
C_{2}H_{6}OS	dimethyl sulfoxide	67-68-5
C_{2}H_{6}OS_{2}	methyl methanethiosulfinate	13882-12-7
C_{2}H_{6}O_{2}	ethyl hydroperoxide	3031-74-1
C_{2}H_{6}O_{2}	ethylene glycol	107-21-1
C_{2}H_{6}O_{2}S	dimethyl sulfone	67-71-0
C_{2}H_{6}O_{2}S_{2}	methyl methanethiosulfonate	2949-92-0
C_{2}H_{6}O_{4}	dioxybismethanol	17088-73-2
C_{2}H_{6}O_{5}S_{2}	methanesulfonic anhydride	7143-01-3
C_{2}H_{6}S	dimethyl sulfide	75-18-3
C_{2}H_{6}S	ethanethiol	75-08-1
C_{2}H_{6}S_{5}	dimethyl pentasulfide	7330-31-6
C_{2}H_{6}Se	dimethyl selenide	593-79-3
C_{2}H_{6}Se_{2}	dimethyl diselenide	7101-31-7
C_{2}H_{6}Si_{2}	disilyl acetylene	1070-76-4
C_{2}H_{6}Sn	dimethylstannylene radical	23120-99-2
C_{2}H_{6}Te	dimethyltelluride	593-80-6
C_{2}H_{6}Zn	dimethylzinc	544-97-8
C_{2}H_{7}As	dimethylarsine	593-57-7
C_{2}H_{7}AsO_{3}	ethylarsonic acid	507-32-4
C_{2}H_{7}BF_{3}N	dimethylaminetrifluoroborane	811-59-6
C_{2}H_{7}BO_{2}	ethyldihydroxyborane	4433-63-0
C_{2}H_{7}ClO	dimethyl ether hydrogen chloride complex	24521-77-5
C_{2}H_{7}N	ethylamine	75-04-7
C_{2}H_{7}NO	acetaldehyde ammonia trimer	75-39-8
C_{2}H_{7}NO	ethanolamine	141-43-5
C_{2}H_{7}NO_{2}S	ethanesulfonamide	1520-70-3
C_{2}H_{7}NO_{3}S	taurine	91105-79-2
C_{2}H_{7}NO_{4}S_{2}	dimethane sulfonamide	5347-82-0
C_{2}H_{7}NS	mercaptamine	60-23-1
C_{2}H_{7}O_{3}P	ethylphosphonic acid	15845-66-6
C_{2}H_{8}BF_{4}N	dimethylammonium tetrafluoroborate	16970-97-1
C_{2}H_{8}BrN	ethylammoniumbromide	593-55-5
C_{2}H_{8}N_{2}	ethylenediamine	107-15-3
C_{2}H_{8}N_{2}O_{4}	ammonium oxalate	1113-38-8
C_{2}H_{8}O_{2}Si	dimethoxysilane	5314-52-3
C_{2}H_{9}N_{2}O_{3}	ethylammonium nitrate	22113-86-6
C_{2}H_{10}N_{2}O_{8}S_{2}Fe	ferrous ethylenediammonium sulfate	63589-59-3
C_{2}H_{12}CdTe	dimethylcadmium·dimethyltellurium	143481-66-7
C_{2}H_{12}N_{6}O_{4}S	guanidine sulfate	594-14-9
C_{2}HgN_{2}S_{2}	mercuric thiocyanate	592-85-8
C_{2}Ho	holmium dicarbide	12071-14-6
C_{2}K_{2}N_{2}	potassium cyanide dimer	55186-08-8
C_{2}La	lanthanum dicarbide	12071-15-7
C_{2}Li_{2}	lithium carbide	1070-75-3
C_{2}Lu	lutetium dicarbide	12175-89-2
C_{2}Mg	magnesium carbide	12122-46-2
C_{2}N_{2}	bisisocyanide	78800-21-2
C_{2}N_{2}	cyanogen	460-19-5
C_{2}N_{2}Na_{2}	sodium cyanide	55186-09-9
C_{2}N_{2}O	cyanogen isocyanate	22430-66-6
C_{2}N_{2}S	cyanogen isothiocyanate	56023-03-1
C_{2}N_{2}S	sulfur dicyanide	627-52-1
C_{2}N_{2}S_{2}	thiocyanogen	505-14-6
C_{2}N_{2}Se	selenium cyanide	2180-01-0
C_{2}N_{4}O_{6}	trinitroacetonitrile	630-72-8
C_{2}N_{6}O_{12}	hexanitroethane	918-37-6
C_{2}Na_{2}	Sodium carbide	2881-62-1
C_{2}Na_{2}O_{4}	sodium oxalate	62-76-0
C_{2}Nd	neodymium dicarbide	12071-21-5
C_{2}O	dicarbon monoxide	12071-23-7
C_{2}P	dicarbon phosphide	12602-39-0
C_{2}Rh	rhodium dicarbide	37306-47-1
C_{2}Sc	scandium dicarbide	12175-91-6
C_{2}Si	silicon dicarbide	12071-27-1
C_{2}Si_{2}	disiladicarbide	12144-09-1
C_{2}Th	thorium dicarbide	12071-31-7
C_{2}Ti	titanium dicarbide	12071-32-8
C_{2}U	uranium dicarbide	12071-33-9
C_{2}V	vanadium dicarbide	12542-39-1
C_{2}Y	yttrium dicarbide	12071-35-1
C_{2}Zr	zirconium dicarbide	12340-54-4

== See also ==
- Carbon number
- List of compounds with carbon number 1
- List of compounds with carbon number 3
