= Praseodymium disilicide =

Names
- IUPAC name bis(λ^{2}-silanylidene)praseodymium
- Other names Praseodymium silicide, praseodymium(II) silicide

Identifiers
CAS Number	12066-83-0
3D model (JSmol)	Interactive image
ChemSpider	4891904
ECHA InfoCard	100.031.872
EC Number	235-072-4
PubChem CID	6336912
CompTox Dashboard (EPA)	DTXSID101307903
- InChI: InChI=1S/Pr.2Si Key: ZCMRYZQUCFDADZ-UHFFFAOYSA-N
- SMILES: [Si]=[Pr]=[Si]

Properties
Chemical formula	PrSi_{2}
Molar mass	197.078 g·mol^{−1}
Appearance	Dark gray powder
Density	5.46 g/cm^{3}
Melting point	1,712 °C (3,114 °F; 1,985 K)
Solubility in water	insoluble

Structure
Crystal structure	Orthorhombic
- Except where otherwise noted, data are given for materials in their standard state (at 25 °C [77 °F], 100 kPa). Infobox references

Praseodymium disilicide is a binary inorganic compound of praseodymium and silicon with the chemical formula PrSi_{2}.

== Synthesis ==
Fusion of stoichiometric amounts of pure substances:

Pr + 2Si → PrSi_{2}

== Physical properties ==
Praseodymium disilicide forms crystals of orthorhombic system, spatial group I ma, cell parameters a = 0.417 nm, b = 0.411 nm, c = 1.385 nm, Z = 4, the structure type of gadolinium disilicide.

At a temperature of 123-147 °C, a phase transition occurs into tetragonal system, spatial group I 41/amd, cell parameters a = 0.4140 nm, c = 1.364 nm, Z = 4, the structure type of thorium disilicide.

The compound melts congruently at a temperature of 1712 °C and has a wide homogeneity range of 64-66.7 atm.% silicon (sometimes the compound formula is written as PrSi_{1.8}).

At a temperature of 11.5 K, the compound demonstrates a transition to the ferromagnetic state.

== Uses ==
Praseodymium disilicide is a dense material known for its exceptional hardness, high melting temperature, and reliable mechanical and thermal stability. The compound also exhibits distinctive electrical and magnetic properties, making it well-suited for applications such as protective coatings in reactors, electronic devices, and magnetic material components.
