= Bromal =

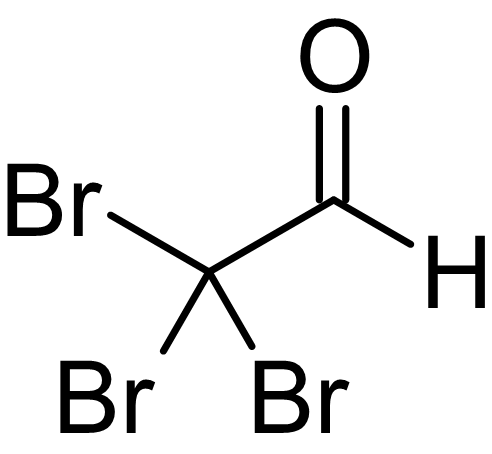

Names
- Other names Tribromoacetaldehyde

Identifiers
CAS Number	115-17-3
3D model (JSmol)	Interactive image
ChEMBL	ChEMBL3189061
ChemSpider	21106514
ECHA InfoCard	100.003.698
EC Number	204-067-9
PubChem CID	8256
UNII	W2WDI7648E
CompTox Dashboard (EPA)	DTXSID1021667
- InChI: InChI=1S/C2HBr3O/c3-2(4,5)1-6/h1H Key: YTGSYRVSBPFKMQ-UHFFFAOYSA-N
- SMILES: C(=O)C(Br)(Br)Br

Properties
Chemical formula	C_{2}HBr_{3}O
Molar mass	280.741 g·mol^{−1}
Appearance	Oily liquid
Melting point	−57.5 °C (−71.5 °F; 215.7 K)
Boiling point	174 °C (345 °F; 447 K)
Solubility in water	Reacts to form bromal hydrate

Hazards
- Occupational safety and health (OHS/OSH)
Main hazards	Toxic
- GHS labelling
Pictograms	(GHS05: Corrosive) (GHS06: Toxic)
Signal word	Danger
Hazard statements	H301, H310, H314
Precautionary statements	P260, P262, P264, P270, P280, P301+P316, P301+P330+P331, P302+P352, P302+P361+P354, P304+P340, P305+P354+P338, P316, P321, P330, P361+P364, P363, P405, P501
- Lethal dose or concentration (LD, LC)
LD_{50} (median dose)	100 mg/kg (rat, oral); 25 mg/kg (mice, oral)

Related compounds
Related compounds	Fluoral, Chloral, Iodal
- Except where otherwise noted, data are given for materials in their standard state (at 25 °C [77 °F], 100 kPa). Infobox references

Bromal (tribromoacetaldehyde) is a brominated aldehyde. It reacts with water to form bromal hydrate.

== See also ==
- Chloral
- Chloral hydrate
