= Tribromoethanol =

Chemical compound

Clinical data
- Trade names: Avertin
- Other names: Tribromoethyl alcohol

Identifiers
- IUPAC name: 2,2,2-Tribromoethanol
- CAS Number: 75-80-9
- PubChem CID: 6400
- ChemSpider: 6160
- UNII: 149JI83A44
- CompTox Dashboard (EPA): DTXSID2023698
- ECHA InfoCard: 100.000.822

Chemical and physical data
- Formula: C_{2}H_{3}Br_{3}O
- Molar mass: 282.757 g·mol^{−1}
- 3D model (JSmol): Interactive image
- Melting point: 73–79 °C (163–174 °F)
- Boiling point: 199 °C (390 °F) at 1atm
- SMILES: C(C(Br)(Br)Br)O
- InChI: InChI=1S/C2H3Br3O/c3-2(4,5)1-6/h6H,1H2; Key:YFDSDPIBEUFTMI-UHFFFAOYSA-N

2,2,2-Tribromoethanol, often called just tribromoethanol, is a chemical compound with formula Br_{3}C−CH_{2}OH. Its molecule can be described as that of ethanol, with the three hydrogen atoms in position 2 (on the methyl group) replaced by bromine. It is a white crystalline solid, soluble in water and other solvents, that absorbs strongly in the UV below 290 nm.

Tribromoethanol is used in medicine and biology as an anesthetic, and has been available commercially for that purpose by the trade name Avertin. It was formerly used on humans and is still often used on laboratory animals, and to capture wild birds. It is also used in plastics industry as a polymerization initiator.

== Uses ==
=== Animal anesthetic ===
Tribromoethanol is often used to anesthetize laboratory animals, particularly rodents, before surgery. As a solution in tert-amyl alcohol, it has the brand name Avertin. The tert-amyl alcohol acts as a weak hypnotic, in addition to improving the solubility of the tribromoethanol. Administered intravenously, tribromoethanol (Avertin) causes rapid and deep anesthesia followed by rapid and full postoperative recovery in small mammals. Recently its safety for this purpose has been questioned.

=== Wildlife capture ===
Tribromoethanol has also been long used as spiked grain bait to capture wild turkeys for research and wildlife management purposes. However, the birds learn to avoid it, for over a year, after a single exposure, and will drive other flock members away from the bait when they detect it.

=== Human anesthetic ===
In the first half of the 20th century, Avertin was also used in humans as a general anesthetic or basal narcotic to induce unconsciousness prior to the administration of other anesthetic agents. It was administered rectally as a retention enema or by intravenous injection. Its rectal use was particularly favored for pediatrics, head or neck surgery, or in mentally unstable or anxious patients. Electrophysiology studies showed that tribromoethanol acts as a positive allosteric modulator of the inhibitory GABA_{A} and glycine receptors, a mechanism similar to that seen with the related compound 2,2,2-trichloroethanol. Bromal hydrate (2,2,2-tribromoethanol-1,1-diol), a compound also recognized to produce general anesthesia in animals, is metabolized to tribromoethanol.

=== Polymerization initiator ===
Tribromoethanol can be used as a functional polymerization initiator for the introduction of α-hydroxyl groups in poly(methyl methacrylate) (PMMA) and poly(n-butyl acrylate) (PBAK).

== Chemistry ==
=== Photolysis ===
Tribromoethanol should be kept refrigerated and in the dark, to prevent decomposition by light into hydrobromic acid and possibly 2,2-dibromoacetaldehyde or glycolic acid.

== See also ==
- Trichloroethanol
- Trifluoroethanol
