= C2H2Cl2O =

The molecular formula C_{2}H_{2}Cl_{2}O may refer to:

- Chloroacetyl chloride
- Dichloroacetaldehyde
