= Fluoral =

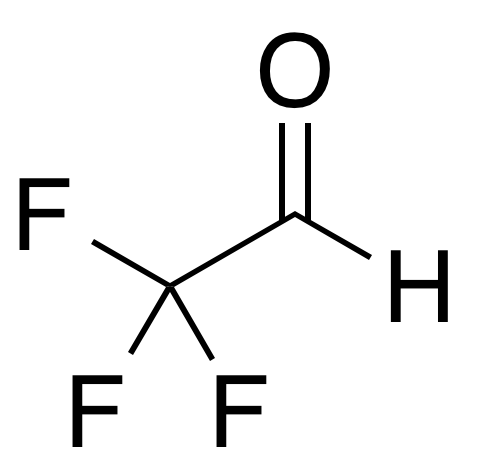

Names
- IUPAC name Trifluoroethanal
- Other names Trifluoroacetaldehyde

Identifiers
CAS Number	75-90-1; hydrate: 421-53-4
3D model (JSmol)	Interactive image; hydrate: Interactive image
ChemSpider	59007
EC Number	200-914-1; hydrate: 207-006-4
PubChem CID	65564; hydrate: 67901
UNII	hydrate: DWG4394PJH
CompTox Dashboard (EPA)	DTXSID30893881 DTXSID3058791, DTXSID30893881; hydrate: DTXSID4059964
- InChI: InChI=1S/C2HF3O/c3-2(4,5)1-6/h1H Key: JVTSHOJDBRTPHD-UHFFFAOYSA-N; hydrate: InChI=1S/C2H3F3O2/c3-2(4,5)1(6)7/h1,6-7H Key: VGJWVEYTYIBXIA-UHFFFAOYSA-N
- SMILES: C(=O)C(F)(F)F; hydrate: OC(O)C(F)(F)F

Properties
Chemical formula	CF_{3}CHO
Molar mass	98.024 g·mol^{−1}
Appearance	gas, hydrate is colourless crystals
Melting point	66 °C (hydrate)
Boiling point	–18 °C 104 °C (hydrate)
Solubility in water	forms hydrate

Related compounds
Related compounds	Chloral; Bromal; Iodal
- Except where otherwise noted, data are given for materials in their standard state (at 25 °C [77 °F], 100 kPa). Infobox references

Trifluoroacetaldehyde, trifluoroethanal, or fluoral, is a fluorinated derivative of acetaldehyde with the formula CF_{3}CHO. It is a gas at room temperature. Fluoral is used to introduce trifluoromethyl groups into organic compounds. It is highly electrophilic and forms a hydrate CF_{3}CH(OH)_{2} upon contact with water like other halogenated acetaldehydes. It is commonly used in form of ethyl hemiacetal (1-ethoxy-2,2,2-trifluoroethanol, CF_{3}CH(OCH_{2}CH_{3})(OH)) due to the aldehyde's tendency to polymerise.

== Synthesis and reactions ==
Upon storage, fluoral polymerises into a waxy, white solid that is soluble in diethyl ether and acetone but not water and chlorocarbons. Heating of this polymer gives monomeric fluoral. Fluoral can be prepared from trifluoroacetic acid with lithium aluminium hydride in diethyl ether:

CF_{3}COOH + LiAlH_{4} → CF_{3}CHO + ...

or with concentrated sulfuric acid.

Cathodic reduction of bromotrifluoromethane in dimethylformamide with aluminium as anode gives high yields of fluoral. In this reaction, DMF acts both as the solvent and the formylation agent. Vapour-phase oxidation of trifluoroethanol also gives fluoral.

Photolysis of fluoral gives fluoroform, hexafluoroethane and carbon monoxide, along with some hydrogen.

One known drug use of fluoral is in the synthesis LGD-2226.

== See also ==
- Chloral
- Bromal
- Iodal
