= Conrad Willgerodt =

German chemist (1841–1930)

- Born: 2 November 1841; Harlingerode, Duchy of Brunswick, today Bad Harzburg, Germany
- Died: 19 December 1930 (aged 89); Germany
- Known for: Willgerodt reaction
- Scientific career
- Workplaces: University of Freiburg
- Doctoral advisor: Adolf Karl Ludwig Claus

Conrad Heinrich Christoph Willgerodt (2 November 1841 – 19 December 1930) was a German chemist who first described the Willgerodt reaction. Alongside the Willgerodt reaction, he had also discovered Iodosobenzene and chlorobutanol and several nitrophenol ethers.

As for his career, Conrad Willgerodt was a professor at the University of Freiburg.
