= Chloral cyanohydrin =

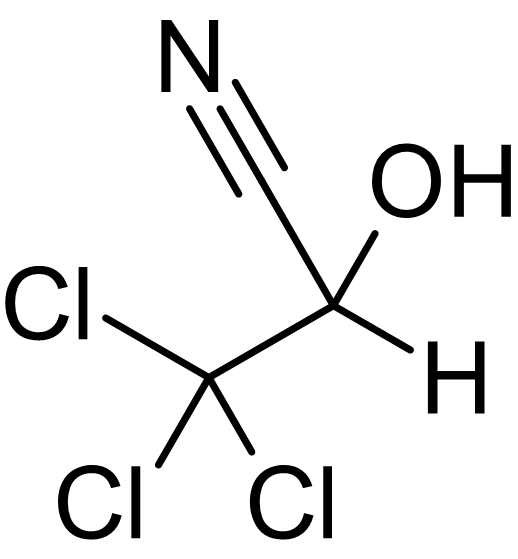

Names
- Other names Chloral cyanhydrin Chloral hydrocyanate Chloral hydrocyanide Trichloroacetaldehyde cyanohydrin Trichlorolactonitrile

Identifiers
CAS Number	513-96-2
3D model (JSmol)	Interactive image
ChemSpider	91916
ECHA InfoCard	100.007.435
EC Number	208-177-8
PubChem CID	101730
UNII	H4V24O06Q6
CompTox Dashboard (EPA)	DTXSID30870576
- InChI: InChI=1S/C3H2Cl3NO/c4-3(5,6)2(8)1-7/h2,8H Key: UFVLRHXFRXZBHS-UHFFFAOYSA-N
- SMILES: C(#N)C(C(Cl)(Cl)Cl)O

Properties
Chemical formula	C_{3}H_{2}Cl_{3}NO
Molar mass	174.41 g·mol^{−1}
Appearance	White solid
Melting point	61 °C (142 °F; 334 K)

Hazards
- Occupational safety and health (OHS/OSH)
Main hazards	Toxic
- Except where otherwise noted, data are given for materials in their standard state (at 25 °C [77 °F], 100 kPa). Infobox references

Chloral cyanohydrin is the cyanohydrin derivative of chloral (trichloroacetaldehyde). It was historically used as a source of hydrogen cyanide for medicinal purposes. Chloral cyanohydrin is toxic by inhalation.

== See also ==
- Chloral hydrate
