= Chloral =

Chloral
Chloral

Names
- Preferred IUPAC name Trichloroacetaldehyde
- Other names Trichloroethanal

Identifiers
CAS Number	75-87-6
3D model (JSmol)	Interactive image
Beilstein Reference	506422
ChEBI	CHEBI:48814
ChEMBL	ChEMBL27551
ChemSpider	6167
DrugBank	DB02650
ECHA InfoCard	100.000.829
EC Number	200-911-5
KEGG	C14866
PubChem CID	6407
UNII	FLI06WS32H
CompTox Dashboard (EPA)	DTXSID7024744
- InChI: InChI=1S/C2HCl3O/c3-2(4,5)1-6/h1H Key: HFFLGKNGCAIQMO-UHFFFAOYSA-N
- SMILES: ClC(Cl)(Cl)C=O

Properties
Chemical formula	C_{2}HCl_{3}O
Molar mass	147.38 g·mol^{−1}
Appearance	Colorless liquid
Odor	Pungent and irritating
Density	1.404 g/cm^{3}
Melting point	−57.5 °C (−71.5 °F; 215.7 K)
Boiling point	97.8 °C (208.0 °F; 370.9 K)
Solubility in water	Forms soluble hydrate
Solubility in ethanol	Miscible
Solubility in diethyl ether	Miscible
Solubility in chloroform	Miscible
Acidity (pK_{a})	9.66
Magnetic susceptibility (χ)	−6.77×10^{−5} cm^{3}/mol
Refractive index (n_{D})	9.48846

Hazards
- GHS labelling
Pictograms	(GHS06: Toxic) (GHS07: Exclamation mark)
Signal word	Danger
Hazard statements	H301, H302, H315, H319, H335
Precautionary statements	P261, P264, P270, P271, P280, P301+P310, P301+P312, P302+P352, P304+P340, P305+P351+P338, P312, P321, P330, P332+P313, P337+P313, P362, P403+P233, P405, P501
- Lethal dose or concentration (LD, LC)
LD_{50} (median dose)	480 mg/kg (rat, oral)

Related compounds
Related compounds	Fluoral, Bromal, Iodal
- Except where otherwise noted, data are given for materials in their standard state (at 25 °C [77 °F], 100 kPa). verify (what is ?) Infobox references

Chloral, also known as trichloroacetaldehyde or trichloroethanal, is the organic compound with the formula Cl_{3}CCHO. This aldehyde is a colourless liquid that is soluble in a wide range of solvents. It reacts with water to form chloral hydrate, a once widely used sedative and hypnotic substance.

== Production ==
Chloral was first prepared, and named, by the German chemist Justus von Liebig in 1832. Liebig treated anhydrous ethanol with dry chlorine gas.

Chloral is produced commercially by the chlorination of acetaldehyde in the presence of hydrochloric acid, producing chloral hydrate. Ethanol can also be used as a feedstock. This reaction is catalyzed by antimony trichloride:

H_{3}CCHO + 3 Cl_{2} + H_{2}O → Cl_{3}CCH(OH)_{2} + 3 HCl

The chloral hydrate is distilled from the reaction mixture. The distillate is then dehydrated with concentrated sulfuric acid, after which the heavier acid layer (containing the water) is drawn off:

Cl_{3}CCH(OH)_{2} → Cl_{3}CCHO + H_{2}O

The resulting product is purified by fractional distillation. Small amounts of chloral hydrate occur in some chlorinated water.

== Key reactions ==
Chloral tends to form adducts with water (to give chloral hydrate) and alcohols.

Aside from its tendency to hydrate, chloral is notable as a building block in the synthesis of DDT. For this purpose, chloral is treated with chlorobenzene in the presence of a catalytic amount of sulfuric acid:

Cl_{3}CCHO + 2 C_{6}H_{5}Cl → Cl_{3}CCH(C_{6}H_{4}Cl)_{2} + H_{2}O

This reaction was described by Othmar Zeidler in 1874. The related herbicide methoxychlor is also produced from chloral.

Treating chloral with sodium hydroxide gives chloroform Cl_{3}CH and sodium formate HCOONa.

Cl_{3}CCHO + NaOH → Cl_{3}CH + HCOONa

Chloral is easily reduced to trichloroethanol, which is produced in the body from chloral.

== Toxicity ==
Chloral and chloral hydrate have the same properties biologically since the former hydrates rapidly. Chloral hydrate was routinely administered to patients on the gram scale with no lasting effects. Prolonged exposure to the vapors is toxic with a LC_{50} for 4-hour exposure of 440 mg/m^{3}.

== See also ==
- Chloral cyanohydrin
- Chloroacetaldehyde
- Dichloroacetaldehyde
- Fluoral
- Bromal
- Iodal
