= Phosphiranes =

Phosphiranes are organic compounds with the phosphirane functional group – a three-membered ring with two atoms of carbon and one atom of phosphorus that has lots of ring angle strain. Phosphiranes are usually synthesized by double substitution reactions or pericyclic pathways. Phosphiranes can also be oxidized into phosphirane oxides, undergo SN2 substitution reactions, or decompose into different units.

== Structure ==
Phosphirane functional group is a very strained structure - the C-P-C bond angle in phosphirane ring structure is 49°, even lower than the C-N-C angle in aziridine and the C-C-C angle in cyclopropane (60°). This high angle strain causes a higher inversion barrier as well as the increased s-character of the lone pair on the phosphorus atom, making the phosphorus atom a very weak nucleophile. As a result, there is no known phosphiranium salt with the phosphirane structure protonated on the phosphorus atom.

== Synthesis ==
=== Double bimolecular nucleophilic substitution of vicinal dichlorides ===
The first synthesis of phosphirane was done by reacting sodium phosphinide with 1,2-dichloroethane in liquid ammonia. In this case, the phosphinide anion, acting as the strong nucleophile, substitutes one of the chlorides first and then substitutes the other one intramolecularly, both of which are through SN2 mechanism.

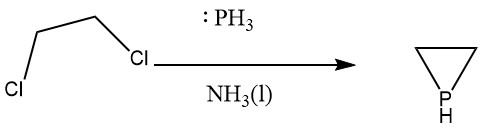

=== Phosphinidene transfer to electron deficient olefins ===
The very recent synthesis reported in 2019 proceeds through the transfer of a phosphinidene species from dibenzo-7-(R)-7-phospha-norbornadiene (RPA) onto styrene under the catalysis of tetramethylammonium fluoride and [Fe(η^{5}-C_{5}H_{5})(CO)_{2}(THF)][BF_{4}], forming an enantiomerically pure phosphirane.

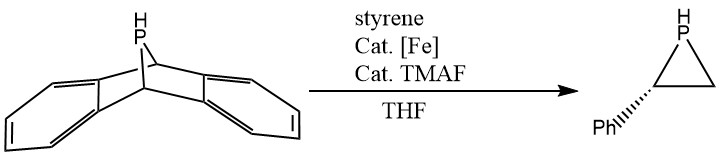

In 2022, reported by Tiansi Xin, the same reaction was achieved using a different catalyst: [CpFe(CO)_{2}]_{2}.

=== Combining phosphaalkenes and diazomethane species through cycloaddition ===
Besides synthesizing phosphiranes from P and C_{2} units, phosphiranes can also be produced from PC and C units, such as the reaction between of bis(trimethylsilyl)-aminotrimethylsilylmethylenephosphine and trimethylsilyldiazomethane. Upon photon irritation, the dinitrogen group of the cycloaddition product leaves, generating a phosphorus (V) intermediate that undergoes electrocyclization to give the phosphorane functional group.

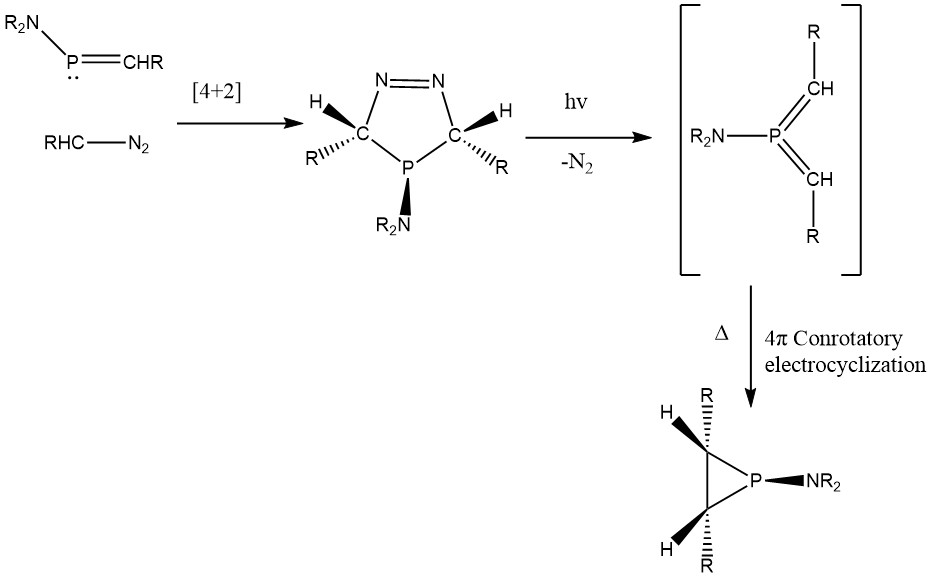

=== Cyclization of tertiary phosphines and phosphine oxides derivatives ===
Tertiary dibenzylphosphine is treated with 2 equivalents of tert-butyllithium with tetramethylethylenediamine to generate the dilithium intermediate which cyclizes to phosphirane upon addition of carbon tetrachloride,

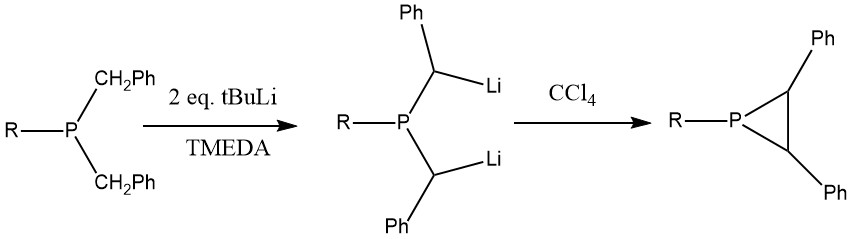

Similarly, phosphirane oxides can be generated from the corresponding bisylide derivatives using lithium diethylamide:

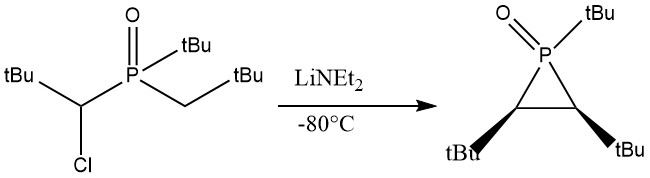

Note that the t-butyl or other bulky functional groups are needed to ensure the stability of the product.

=== Polycyclic phosphirane synthesis ===
Phosphorine can react with diphenyldiazomethane to generate polycyclic phosphirane species.

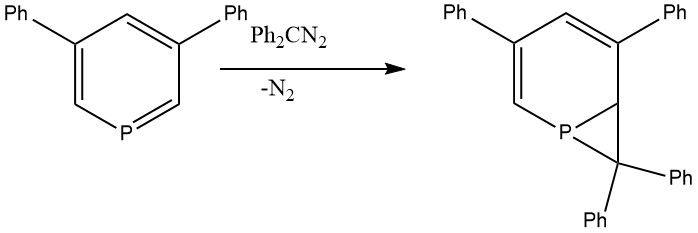

The diazomethane species must be highly conjugated to ensure the formation of the three membered ring.

By reacting dilithium cyclooctatetraenide with 2,4,6-tri-t-butylphenylphosphonous dichloride, the following air and room temperature stable bicyclic phosphirane can be produced with the help of steric protection from the bulky ligand:

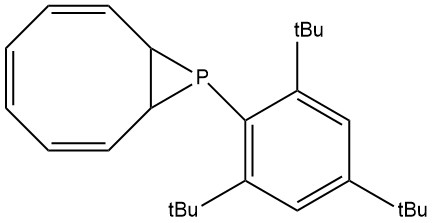

== Reactivity ==
The phosphirane species on the 8-membered ring compound mentioned in the previous paragraph can be oxidized into the corresponding phosphirane oxide by t-butyl hydroperoxide. Note that the product, which is stable under room temperature and air, still contains a sterically strained 3-membered ring due to steric protection from the nearby bulky ligands.

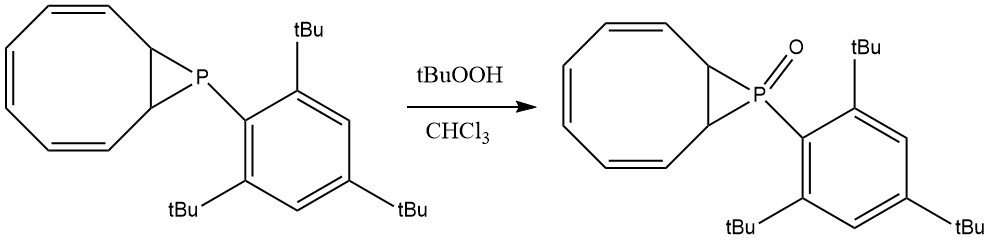

Since the lone pair of phosphorus atom in the phosphirane has an increased amount of s-character, phosphirane's nucleophilicity is low but its electrophilicity is high. Therefore, one can substitute the chloride in the following sterically hindered phosphirane chloride using different corresponding alkyllithium reagents.

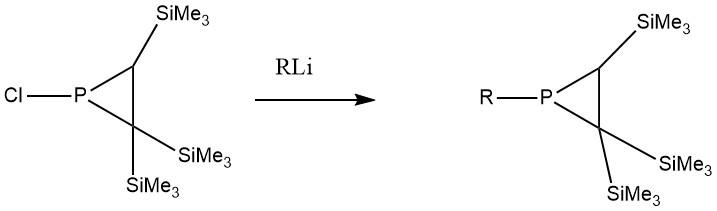
R = Me, tBu, nBu, sBu, Me_{3}SiCH_{2}, (Me_{3}Si)_{2}CCI, Et2N, iPr2N, MeO, tBuO, tBuS, nBu_{2}P, (Me_{3}Si)_{2}P, H

Upon heating, the t-butyl group protected phospirane oxide species decomposes into (Z)-2,2,5,5-tetramethyl-3-hexene and a very reactive intermediate t-butyl phosphinidene oxide which can be further trapped using water, methanol, or o-quinones.

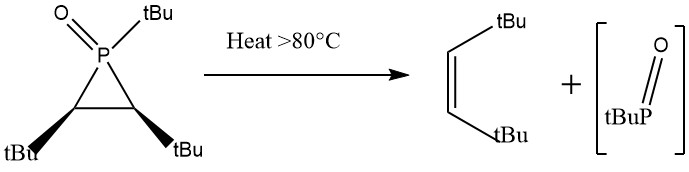
