= Thorium dicarbide =

Identifiers
| CAS Number | 12071-31-7 |
| 3D model (JSmol) | Interactive image |
| ECHA InfoCard | 100.031.926 |
| EC Number | 235-131-4 |
| CompTox Dashboard (EPA) | DTXSID701314603 |
- InChI: InChI=1S/2C.Th Key: DQIWLHDGOYYZII-UHFFFAOYSA-N
- SMILES: [Th].[C].[C]

Properties
| Chemical formula | ThC_{2} |

Related compounds
| Other anions | Thorium disilicide |
| Other cations | Uranium dicarbide |
| Related compounds | Thorium carbide |
- Except where otherwise noted, data are given for materials in their standard state (at 25 °C [77 °F], 100 kPa). Infobox references

Thorium dicarbide is an inorganic compound with the chemical formula ThC_{2}.

== Preparation ==
Thorium dicarbide can be produced by reacting metal thorium and graphite at 2000~2500 °C:

Th + 2C → ThC_{2}

== Properties ==
=== Physical ===
Thorium dicarbide is a yellow crystalline solid that decomposes in water. It ignites at 2773 °C and becomes superconducting at 9 K. At room temperature it has a monoclinic crystal structure with the space group C2/c (space group no. 15). At temperatures between 1430 °C and 1480 °C it exists in a tetragonal phase and above that in a cubic crystal structure.

=== Chemical ===
Thorium dicarbide can be rapidly hydrolyzed in the air to generate thorium dioxide, hydrogen and hydrocarbons. Its reaction rate is 10 times that of the corresponding uranium dicarbide. It can also react with acids, such as sulfuric acid, to generate thorium(IV) sulfate.

== External reading ==
- D.W. Jones, I.J. McColm, R. Steadman, J. Yerkess (Jun 1987). "A neutron-diffraction study of the tetragonal-monoclinic crystal structures of some uranium-thorium dicarbides". Journal of Solid State Chemistry. 68 (2): 219–226. Bibcode:1987JSSCh..68..219J. doi:10.1016/0022-4596(87)90306-9. Archived from the original on 2018-06-26. Archived at linkinghub.elsevier.com
- Ishino, Toshio; Tamura, Hideo. Thorium carbides. Technology Reports of the Osaka University, 1965. 16 (658–684): 315–324. ISSN: 0030-6177. CODEN: TROUAI.
