= Willgerodt rearrangement =

Chemical reaction

Named after	Conrad Willgerodt
Reaction type	Rearrangement reaction

Identifiers
RSC ontology ID	RXNO:0000185

The Willgerodt rearrangement or Willgerodt reaction is an organic reaction converting an aryl alkyl ketone, alkyne, or alkene to the corresponding amide by reaction with ammonium polysulfide, named after Conrad Willgerodt. The formation of the corresponding carboxylic acid is a side reaction resulting from hydrolysis of the amide. When the alkyl group is an aliphatic chain (n typically 0 to 5), multiple reactions take place with the amide group always ending up at the terminal end. The net effect is thus migration of the carbonyl group to the end of the chain and oxidation.

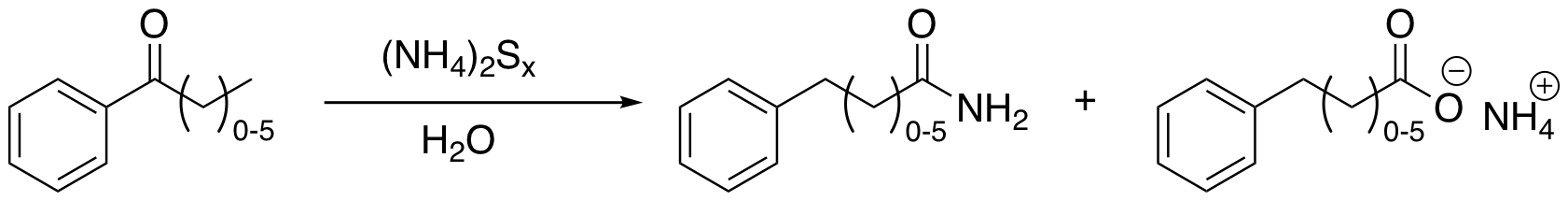
General scheme for the Willgerodt rearrangement

An example with modified reagents (sulfur, concentrated ammonium hydroxide and pyridine) is the conversion of acetophenone to 2-phenylacetamide and phenylacetic acid

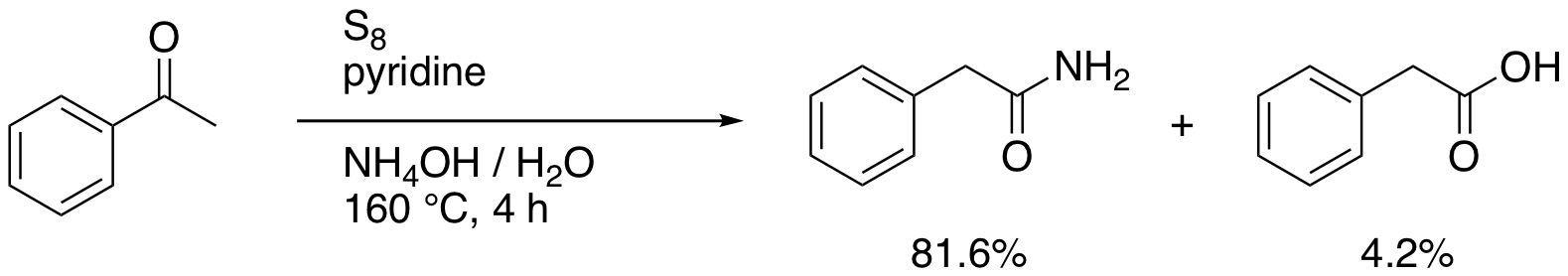
The Willgerodt rearrangement using acetophenone

== Willgerodt–Kindler reaction ==
Willgerodt–Kindler reaction
Named after	Conrad Willgerodt; Karl Kindler
Reaction type	Rearrangement reaction

Identifiers
Organic Chemistry Portal	willgerodt-kindler-reaction
RSC ontology ID	RXNO:0000186

The related Willgerodt–Kindler reaction takes place with elemental sulfur and an amine like morpholine. The initial product is a thioamide for example that of acetophenone which can again be hydrolyzed to the amide. The reaction is named after Karl Kindler

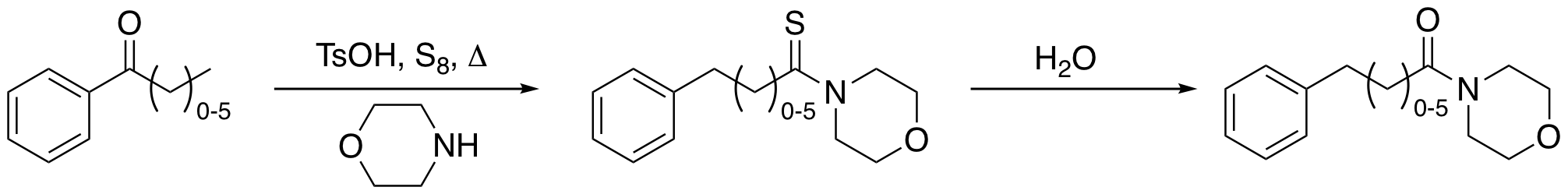
The Kindler modification of the Willgerodt rearrangement

A possible reaction mechanism for the Kindler variation is depicted below:

Proposed mechanism for the Willgerodt-Kindler Reaction.

The first stage of the reaction is basic imine formation by the ketone group and the amine group of morpholine to give an enamine(1). This reacts as a nucleophile with electrophilic sulfur, similar to an Stork enamine alkylation reaction (2). The actual rearrangement reaction takes place when the amine group attacks the thiocarbonyl in a nucleophilic addition temporarily forming an aziridine (3) and the thioacetamide by tautomerization (4). This is hydrolysed to give the product amide (5).
