= 2,2,2-Trichloroethanol =

2,2,2-Trichloroethanol
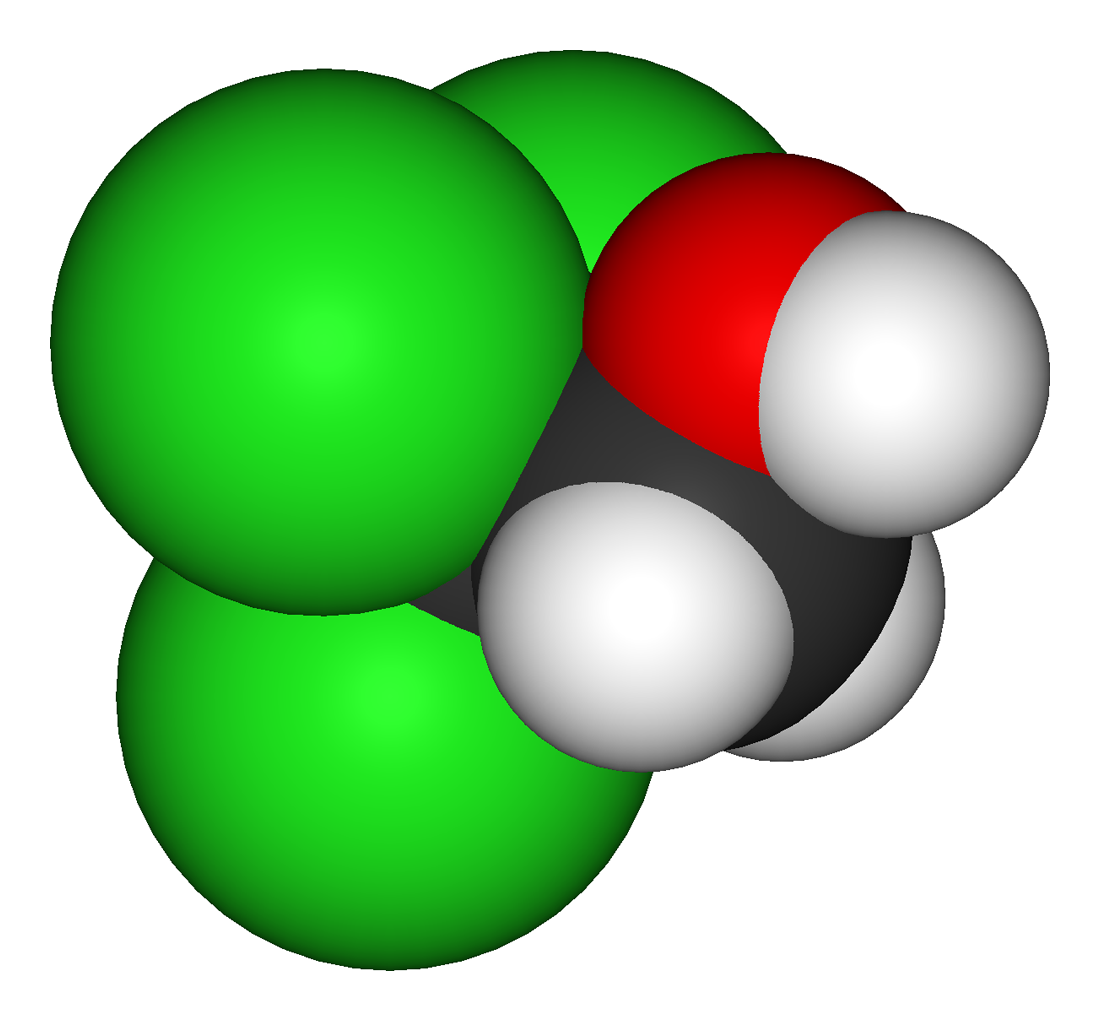
2,2,2-Trichloroethanol

Names
- Preferred IUPAC name 2,2,2-Trichloroethan-1-ol

Identifiers
CAS Number	115-20-8
3D model (JSmol)	Interactive image
Beilstein Reference	1697495
ChEBI	CHEBI:28094
ChEMBL	ChEMBL1171
ChemSpider	7961
ECHA InfoCard	100.003.701
EC Number	204-071-0
Gmelin Reference	2407
IUPHAR/BPS	2293
KEGG	C07490
PubChem CID	8259
UNII	AW835AJ62N
CompTox Dashboard (EPA)	DTXSID1021950
- InChI: InChI=1S/C2H3Cl3O/c3-2(4,5)1-6/h6H,1H2 Key: KPWDGTGXUYRARH-UHFFFAOYSA-N; InChI=1/C2H3Cl3O/c3-2(4,5)1-6/h6H,1H2 Key: KPWDGTGXUYRARH-UHFFFAOYAW
- SMILES: ClC(Cl)(Cl)CO

Properties
Chemical formula	C_{2}H_{3}Cl_{3}O
Molar mass	149.40 g/mol
Density	1.55 g/cm^{3}
Melting point	17.8 °C (64.0 °F; 290.9 K)
Boiling point	151 °C (304 °F; 424 K)

Hazards
- GHS labelling
Pictograms	(GHS05: Corrosive) (GHS07: Exclamation mark)
Signal word	Danger
Hazard statements	H302, H315, H318, H336
Precautionary statements	P261, P264, P270, P271, P280, P301+P312, P302+P352, P304+P340, P305+P351+P338, P310, P312, P321, P330, P332+P313, P362, P403+P233, P405, P501
Flash point	88 °C (190 °F; 361 K)
- Safety data sheet (SDS)
- Except where otherwise noted, data are given for materials in their standard state (at 25 °C [77 °F], 100 kPa). verify (what is ?) Infobox references

2,2,2-Trichloroethanol is the chemical compound with formula Cl_{3}C−CH_{2}OH. Its molecule can be described as that of ethanol, with the three hydrogen atoms at position 2 (the methyl group) replaced by chlorine atoms. It is a clear flammable liquid at room temperature, colorless when pure but often with a light yellow color.

The pharmacological effects of this compound in humans are similar to those of its prodrug chloral hydrate, and of chlorobutanol. Historically, it has been used as a sedative hypnotic. The hypnotic drug triclofos (2,2,2-trichloroethyl phosphate) is metabolized in vivo to 2,2,2-trichloroethanol. Chronic exposure may result in kidney and liver damage.

2,2,2-Trichloroethanol can be added to SDS-PAGE gels in order to enable fluorescent detection of proteins without a staining step, for immunoblotting or other analysis methods.

== Use in organic synthesis ==
2,2,2-Trichloroethanol is an effective protecting group for carboxylic acids due to its ease in addition and removal.

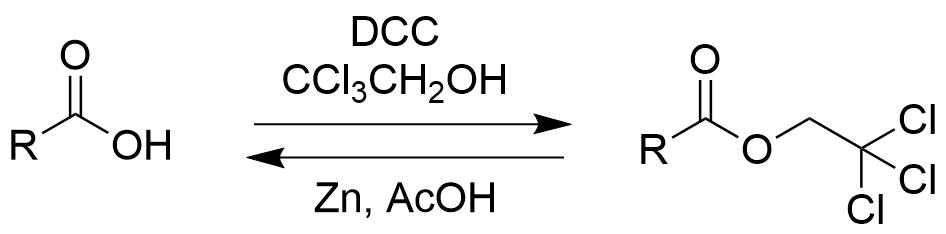

== See also ==
- 1,1,1-Trichloroethane
- Trifluoroethanol
- Tribromoethanol
- Triclofos
