= Thioacetaldehyde =

Names
- IUPAC name Thioacetaldehyde
- Systematic IUPAC name Ethanethial

Identifiers
CAS Number	6851-93-0
3D model (JSmol)	Interactive image
ChemSpider	109854
PubChem CID	123241
CompTox Dashboard (EPA)	DTXSID00218643
- InChI: InChI=1S/C2H4S/c1-2-3/h2H,1H3 Key: QJFUMFCCMJJLIE-UHFFFAOYSA-N
- SMILES: CC=S

Properties
Chemical formula	C_{2}H_{4}S
Molar mass	60.11 g·mol^{−1}
- Except where otherwise noted, data are given for materials in their standard state (at 25 °C [77 °F], 100 kPa). Infobox references

Thioacetaldehyde is the organosulfur compound with the formula C_{2}H_{4}S or CH_{3}CHS.

== Properties ==
Thioacetaldehyde is an unstable molecular species that has been studied primarily by gas-phase spectroscopic methods. It can be generated by the pyrolysis of cyclic sulfur-containing precursors under low-pressure conditions. Under the experimental conditions reported by Kroto et al., its lifetime was approximately 10 seconds.

Microwave spectroscopy has been used to determine its molecular structure and investigate the internal rotation of the methyl group. The measured permanent electric dipole moment is 2.33 ± 0.02 D, with components of 2.26 ± 0.02 D and 0.56 ± 0.01 D along the principal axes reported in the original study. The threefold internal rotation barrier was determined to be 1572 ± 30 cal mol^{-1} (approximately 6.58 ± 0.13 kJ mol^{-1}).

Photoelectron spectroscopy has established a first vertical ionization energy of 8.98 ± 0.02 eV for thioacetaldehyde. Its rotational spectrum has also been investigated at millimeter and submillimeter wavelengths to improve spectroscopic predictions for molecular identification.

== Fate ==
Thioacetaldehyde dimerises to 2,4-dimethyl-1,3-dithietane and timerises to 2,4,6-trimethyl-1,3,5-trithiane.
