= Iodal =

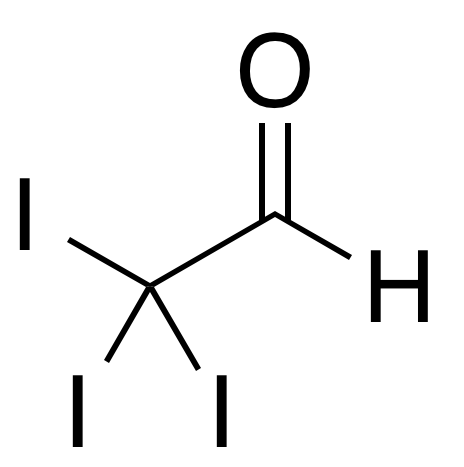

Names
- IUPAC name triiodoethanal
- Other names triiodoacetaldehyde

Identifiers
CAS Number	5703-34-4
3D model (JSmol)	Interactive image
ChemSpider	72077
EC Number	227-192-0
PubChem CID	79783
CompTox Dashboard (EPA)	DTXSID90205643
- InChI: InChI=1S/C2HI3O/c3-2(4,5)1-6/h1H Key: SNWLPURUNKWTPY-UHFFFAOYSA-N
- SMILES: C(=O)C(I)(I)I

Properties
Chemical formula	C_{2}HI_{3}O
Molar mass	421.742 g·mol^{−1}
Appearance	pale yellow liquid or solid
Solubility in water	reacts to form a soluble hydrate
- Except where otherwise noted, data are given for materials in their standard state (at 25 °C [77 °F], 100 kPa). Infobox references

Iodal, or triiodoacetaldehyde, is a halogenated derivative of acetaldehyde with the chemical formula I_{3}CCHO, it is analogous to chloral and bromal. It is described as a pale yellow liquid with a pungent odour by Leopold Gmelin. It is decomposed to iodoform by potash. Iodal was discovered and named in 1837.

Iodal is synthesised from ethanol and iodine with concentrated nitric acid as the catalyst. Its hydrate was described as water-soluble, white silky crystals. Like most iodine compounds, Iodal is unstable under sunlight and gives off iodine over time.
