= Triclofos =

Pharmaceutical drug

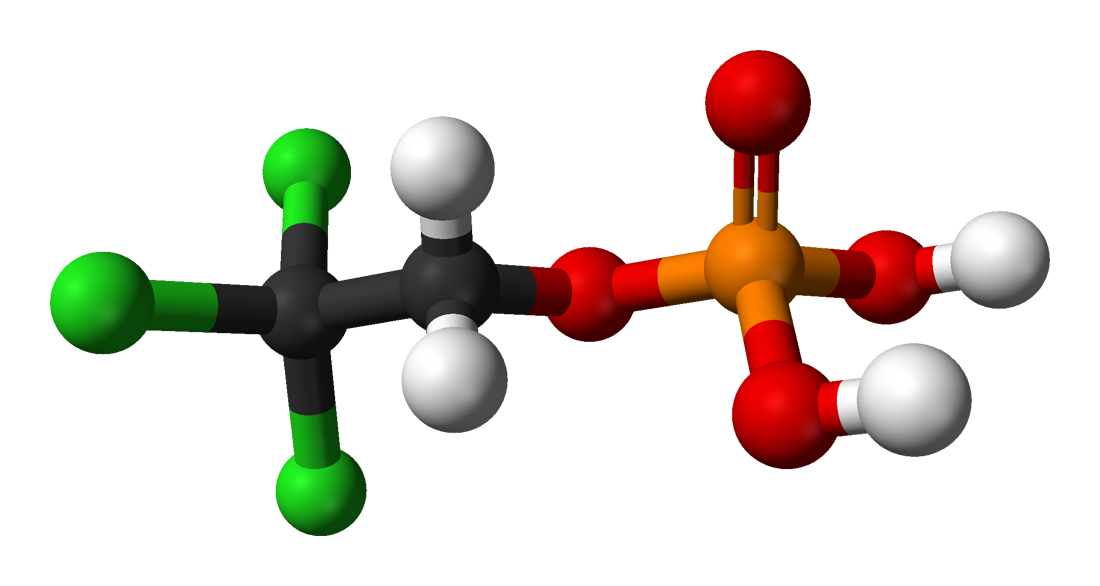

Clinical data
- Trade names: Triclos, others
- AHFS/Drugs.com: International Drug Names
- ATC code: N05CM07 (WHO)

Legal status
- Legal status: BR: Class C1 (Other controlled substances)

Identifiers
- IUPAC name: 2,2,2-trichloroethanol dihydrogen phosphate
- CAS Number: 306-52-5 8060-81-9
- PubChem CID: 5563
- ChemSpider: 5362
- UNII: J712EO9048
- KEGG: C07165
- ChEMBL: ChEMBL1201317
- CompTox Dashboard (EPA): DTXSID9023700
- ECHA InfoCard: 100.005.624

Chemical and physical data
- Formula: C_{2}H_{4}Cl_{3}O_{4}P
- Molar mass: 229.37 g·mol^{−1}
- 3D model (JSmol): Interactive image
- SMILES: ClC(Cl)(Cl)COP(=O)(O)O
- InChI: InChI=1S/C2H4Cl3O4P/c3-2(4,5)1-9-10(6,7)8/h1H2,(H2,6,7,8); Key:YYQRGCZGSFRBAM-UHFFFAOYSA-N

Triclofos (brand names Triclos, Pedicloryl) is a sedative drug used rarely for treating insomnia.

Triclofos is a prodrug which is metabolised in the liver into the active drug trichloroethanol. The half-life of triclofos is fairly long and it may cause drowsiness the next day. Trichloroethanol may cause liver damage and triclofos should not be used for extended periods.

Triclofos is no longer available in the United States.

== Side effects ==
Side effects may include:

- headache
- rash
- dizziness
- flatulence
- confusion
- nightmares
- dependence
- diarrhea
- constipation
- nausea
- vomiting
- abdominal pain
- ataxia
