= Phosphirane =

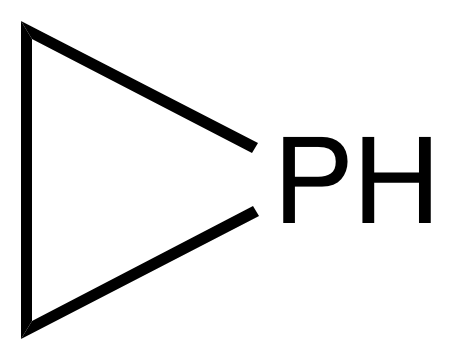

Names
- Preferred IUPAC name Phosphirane
- Systematic IUPAC name Phosphacyclopropane
- Other names Phosphiran

Identifiers
CAS Number	6569-82-0
3D model (JSmol)	Interactive image
ChemSpider	10451470
PubChem CID	15786916
- InChI: InChI=1S/C2H5P/c1-2-3-1/h3H,1-2H2 Key: UTMQOVWWMLZKRY-UHFFFAOYSA-N
- SMILES: C1PC1

Properties
Chemical formula	C_{2}H_{5}P
Molar mass	60.036 g·mol^{−1}
Appearance	colorless gas
Melting point	−121 °C (−186 °F; 152 K)
Boiling point	36.5 °C (97.7 °F; 309.6 K)
- Except where otherwise noted, data are given for materials in their standard state (at 25 °C [77 °F], 100 kPa). Infobox references

Phosphirane is the organophosphorus compound with the formula C_{2}H_{4}PH. It is a colorless gas of no commercial value. As the simplest cyclic, saturated organophosphorus compound, phosphirane is the prototype of a family of related compounds that have attracted attention from the research community. Phosphirane was first prepared by reaction of 1,2-dichloroethane with the conjugate base of phosphine. Phosphiranes, that is substituted phosphirene compounds where one or more of the H's are replaced organic substituents, are far more commonly discussed than the parent phosphirane.
