= Chlorobutanol =

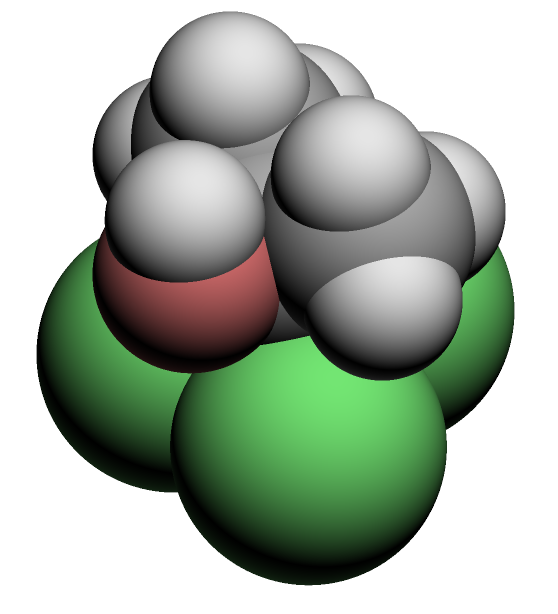

Names
- Preferred IUPAC name 1,1,1-Trichloro-2-methylpropan-2-ol
- Other names 1,1,1-Trichloro-2-methyl-2-propanol; Chlorbutol; Chloreton; Chloretone; Chlortran; Trichloro-tert-butyl alcohol; 1,1,1-Trichloro-tert-butyl alcohol; 2-(Trichloromethyl)propan-2-ol; tert-Trichlorobutyl alcohol; Trichloro-tert-butanol; Trichlorisobutylalcohol; 2,2,2-Trichloro-1,1-dimethylethanol

Identifiers
CAS Number	57-15-8
3D model (JSmol)	Interactive image
ChEMBL	ChEMBL1439973
ChemSpider	13842993
ECHA InfoCard	100.000.288
EC Number	200-317-6
KEGG	D01942
PubChem CID	5977
UNII	HM4YQM8WRC
CompTox Dashboard (EPA)	DTXSID1041217
- InChI: InChI=1S/C4H7Cl3O/c1-3(2,8)4(5,6)7/h8H,1-2H3 Key: OSASVXMJTNOKOY-UHFFFAOYSA-N; InChI=1/C4H7Cl3O/c1-3(2,8)4(5,6)7/h8H,1-2H3 Key: OSASVXMJTNOKOY-UHFFFAOYAO
- SMILES: ClC(Cl)(Cl)C(C)(C)O

Properties
Chemical formula	C_{4}H_{7}Cl_{3}O
Molar mass	177.45 g·mol^{−1}
Appearance	White solid
Odor	Camphor-like
Melting point	95–99 °C (203–210 °F; 368–372 K)
Boiling point	167 °C (333 °F; 440 K)
Solubility in water	Slightly soluble
Solubility in acetone	Soluble

Pharmacology
ATC code	A04AD04 (WHO)

Hazards
- Occupational safety and health (OHS/OSH)
Main hazards	Xn
NFPA 704 (fire diamond)	2 1 0
- Except where otherwise noted, data are given for materials in their standard state (at 25 °C [77 °F], 100 kPa). verify (what is ?) Infobox references

Chlorobutanol (trichloro-2-methyl-2-propanol) is an organic compound with the formula CCl_{3}C(OH)(CH_{3})_{2}. It is a halohydrin—‌specifically a chlorohydrin. Chlorobutanol acts as a preservative, sedative, hypnotic, and weak local anesthetic similar in nature to chloral hydrate; it also has antibacterial and antifungal properties. Chlorobutanol is typically used at a concentration of 0.5% where it lends long term stability to multi-ingredient formulations. However, it retains antimicrobial activity at 0.05% in water. Chlorobutanol has been used in the anesthesia and euthanasia of aquatic invertebrates and various fishes. It is a white, volatile solid with a camphor-like odor.

== Synthesis ==
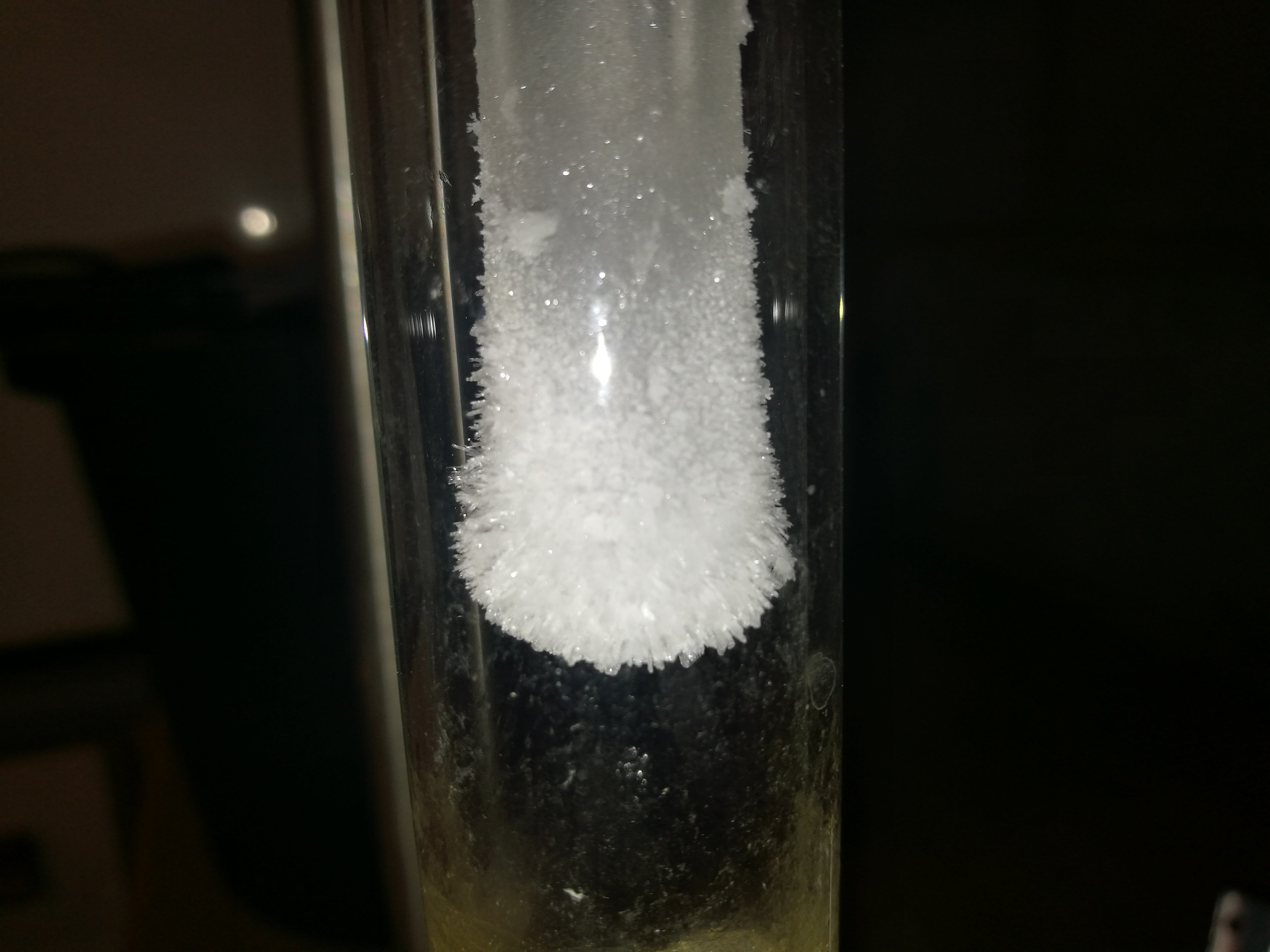
Sublimed crystals of chlorobutanol

Chlorobutanol was first synthesized in 1881 by the German chemist Conrad Willgerodt (1841–1930).

Chlorobutanol is formed by the reaction of chloroform and acetone in the presence of potassium or sodium hydroxide. It may be purified by sublimation or recrystallisation.

== Parthenogenesis ==
Chlorobutanol has proven effective at stimulating parthenogenesis in sea urchin eggs up to the pluteus stage, possibly by increasing irritability to cause stimulation. For the eggs of the fish Oryzias latipes, however, chlorobutanol only acted as an anesthetic.

== Safety ==
It is an anesthetic agent with effects somewhat like isoflurane and halothane when ingested.

Chlorobutanol is also toxic to the liver, skin and eyes.
