= Thorium monosilicide =

Names
- IUPAC name silicon;thorium
- Other names Thorium(II) silicide

Identifiers
3D model (JSmol)	Interactive image
PubChem CID	159688632
- InChI: InChI=1S/Si.Th Key: MWCXNDQKSNSMJN-UHFFFAOYSA-N
- SMILES: [Th].[Si]

Properties
Chemical formula	SiTh
Molar mass	260.123 g·mol^{−1}
Density	9.85 g/cm^{3}
Melting point	1,900 °C (3,450 °F; 2,170 K)

Structure
Crystal structure	Orthorhombic
Space group	Pbnm
- Except where otherwise noted, data are given for materials in their standard state (at 25 °C [77 °F], 100 kPa). Infobox references

Thorium monosilicide is a binary inorganic chemical compound of thorium and silicon with the chemical formula ThSi. The compound is one of several known thorium silicides, and its properties and potential applications have been investigated.

== Synthesis ==
ThSi was first observed in 1953 when samples of ThSi_{1.0} were heated in vacuum to 1700 °C, resulting in the formation of ThSi and β-ThSi_{2}.

== Physical properties ==
Thorium monosilicide has a orthorhombic crystal structure with the space group Pbnm. The compound is isostructural with ZrSi and USi.
