= Perfluoroethylamine =

Names
- Preferred IUPAC name Heptafluoroethanamine

Identifiers
CAS Number	354-80-3
3D model (JSmol)	Interactive image
ChemSpider	119966
PubChem CID	136190
UNII	DCS49FP9EL
CompTox Dashboard (EPA)	DTXSID10276370
- InChI: InChI=1/C2F7N/c3-1(4,5)2(6,7)10(8)9
- SMILES: C(C(F)(F)F)(N(F)F)(F)F

Properties
Chemical formula	C_{2}F_{7}N
Molar mass	171.02 g/mol
Appearance	colorless gas
Melting point	−38.1 °C (−36.6 °F; 235.1 K)
Boiling point	−183 °C (−297.4 °F; 90.1 K)
- Except where otherwise noted, data are given for materials in their standard state (at 25 °C [77 °F], 100 kPa). verify (what is ?) Infobox references

Perfluoroethylamine is an organofluoride. It is perfluorinated ethylamine. Like other N-F containing compounds, it is obscure. Small amounts are formed by the reaction of tetrafluoroethylene and nitrogen trifluoride.
