= Gadolinium disilicide =

Names
- Other names Gadolinium silicide

Identifiers
CAS Number	12134-75-7
3D model (JSmol)	Interactive image
ChemSpider	129556512
EC Number	235-216-6
PubChem CID	17881019
- InChI: InChI=1S/Gd.2Si/q+3;; Key: MDYZLTUIAFSQMZ-UHFFFAOYSA-N
- SMILES: [Si].[Si].[Gd+3]

Properties
Chemical formula	GdSi_{2}
Molar mass	213.42 g·mol^{−1}
Appearance	crystals
Density	5.9 g/cm^{3}
Melting point	1,540 °C (2,800 °F; 1,810 K)
Solubility in water	insoluble

Structure
Crystal structure	Hexagonal, orthorhombic
- Except where otherwise noted, data are given for materials in their standard state (at 25 °C [77 °F], 100 kPa). Infobox references

Gadolinium disilicide is a binary inorganic compound of gadolinium and silicon with the chemical formula GdSi_{2}.

== Synthesis ==
GdSi_{2} can be produced by heating gadolinium and silicon in the presence of mercury. The mercury is removed by distillation after the reaction. The compound can also be produced by the reaction of magnesium silicide and gadolinium chloride.

== Physical properties ==
The compound features a metallic luster and exceptional thermal stability with a high melting point, ideal for high-temperature environments. Its semiconducting behavior varies with temperature and doping, while its hexagonal crystal structure (space group P6/mmm) underpins distinctive electronic and magnetic properties.

Gadolinium disilicide also exists in orthorhombic form, space group Imam.

== Chemical properties ==
The compound is easily oxidized when heated; this fact limits its applications.

== Uses ==
Key applications include: thermoelectric materials leveraging electrical conductivity and thermal insulation, advanced electronics (e.g., spintronics) due to gadolinium’s intrinsic magnetism, magnetic materials research, where its phenomena are studied for novel device integration.

The compound remains a focal point in materials science and condensed matter physics for its multifunctional characteristics.
