= Dimethylaluminium chloride =

Identifiers
CAS Number	1184-58-3
3D model (JSmol)	Interactive image
ChemSpider	21171389
ECHA InfoCard	100.013.335
EC Number	214-668-8
PubChem CID	79147
UNII	B548L3505Q
CompTox Dashboard (EPA)	DTXSID5061580
- InChI: InChI=1S/2CH3.Al.ClH/h2*1H3;;1H/q;;+1;/p-1 Key: JGHYBJVUQGTEEB-UHFFFAOYSA-M
- SMILES: C[Al](C)Cl

Properties
Chemical formula	C_{4}H_{12}Al_{2}Cl_{2}
Molar mass	185.00 g·mol^{−1}
Appearance	colorless liquid
Density	0.996 g cm−3
Melting point	−21 °C (−6 °F; 252 K)
Boiling point	126–127 °C (259–261 °F; 399–400 K)

Hazards
- GHS labelling
Pictograms	(GHS02: Flammable) (GHS05: Corrosive)
Signal word	Danger
Hazard statements	H225, H250, H260, H314
Precautionary statements	P210, P222, P223, P231, P231+P232, P233, P240, P241, P242, P243, P260, P264, P280, P301+P330+P331, P302+P335+P334, P302+P361+P354, P303+P361+P353, P304+P340, P305+P354+P338, P316, P321, P363, P370+P378, P402+P404, P403+P235, P405, P501
- Except where otherwise noted, data are given for materials in their standard state (at 25 °C [77 °F], 100 kPa). Infobox references

Dimethylaluminium chloride is an organoaluminium compound with the chemical formula [(CH_{3})_{2}AlCl]_{2}. It behaves similarly to diethylaluminium chloride but is more expensive. Hence, it is less commonly used.

Like other organoaluminium chlorides, dimethylaluminium chloride is a Lewis acid. This property is exploited by the use of dimethylaluminium chloride to induce some Diels-Alder reactions.

== Structure and bonding ==
Compounds of the empirical formula AlR_{2}Cl (R = alkyl, aryl) usually exist as dimers with the formula (R_{2}Al)_{2}(μ-Cl)_{2}. The bridging ligands, indicated by the prefix "μ-", are halides, not the organic substituents. The aluminium adopts a tetrahedral geometry and follows the octet rule. By contrast, triethylaluminium and trimethylaluminium feature bridging alkyl groups and these compounds violate the octet rule.

== Safety ==
Dimethylaluminium chloride is not only flammable but pyrophoric.
