= Thorium disilicide =

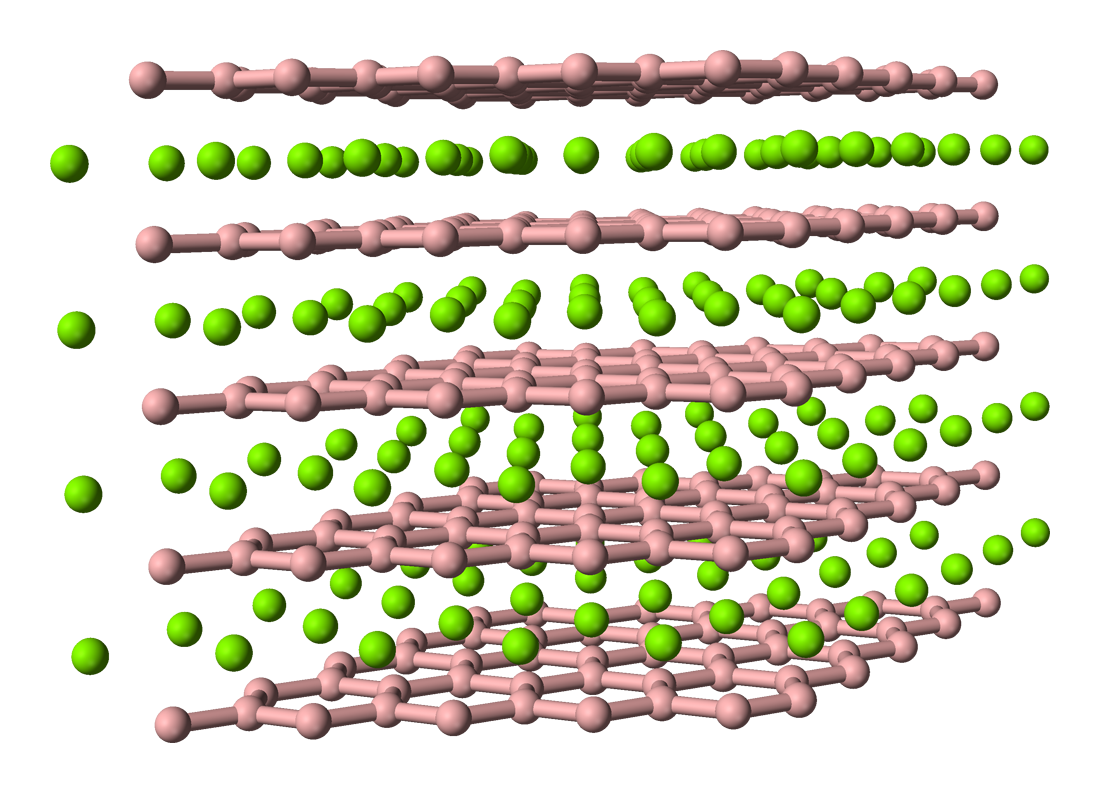

Names
- Other names Thorium(IV) silicide

Identifiers
CAS Number	12067-54-8
3D model (JSmol)	Interactive image
ChemSpider	4891947
ECHA InfoCard	100.031.878
EC Number	235-079-2
PubChem CID	6336980
CompTox Dashboard (EPA)	DTXSID201312971
- InChI: InChI=1S/2Si.Th Key: SMTSTMIEGMUHOG-UHFFFAOYSA-N
- SMILES: [Si]=[Th]=[Si]

Properties
Chemical formula	Si_{2}Th
Molar mass	288.208 g·mol^{−1}
Appearance	black solid
Density	7.78 g/cm³
Melting point	1,700 °C (3,090 °F; 1,970 K)
- Except where otherwise noted, data are given for materials in their standard state (at 25 °C [77 °F], 100 kPa). Infobox references

Thorium disilicide is a binary inorganic chemical compound of thorium and silicon. The compound was first described in detail in 1942 by Georg Brauer and A. Mitius. In addition to this compound, other thorium silicides are known: trithorium disilicide, thorium monosilicide, trithorium pentasilicide, and Th_{6}Si_{11}.

== Synthesis ==
Thorium disilicide was obtained in 1905 by reacting thorium dioxide with silicon in an electric arc and in 1907 by Otto Hönigschmid from the elements at 1000 °C in the presence of aluminum as a solvent.

== Physical properties ==
Thorium disilicide is a black solid. It has a hexagonal crystal structure with the space group P6/mmm (space group no. 191) of the aluminium diboride type. There is also a high-temperature form that forms from the low-temperature form above 1300 °C. This has a tetragonal crystal structure with the space group I4_{1}/amd (space group no. 141).
