= Bromodifluoroacetyl chloride =

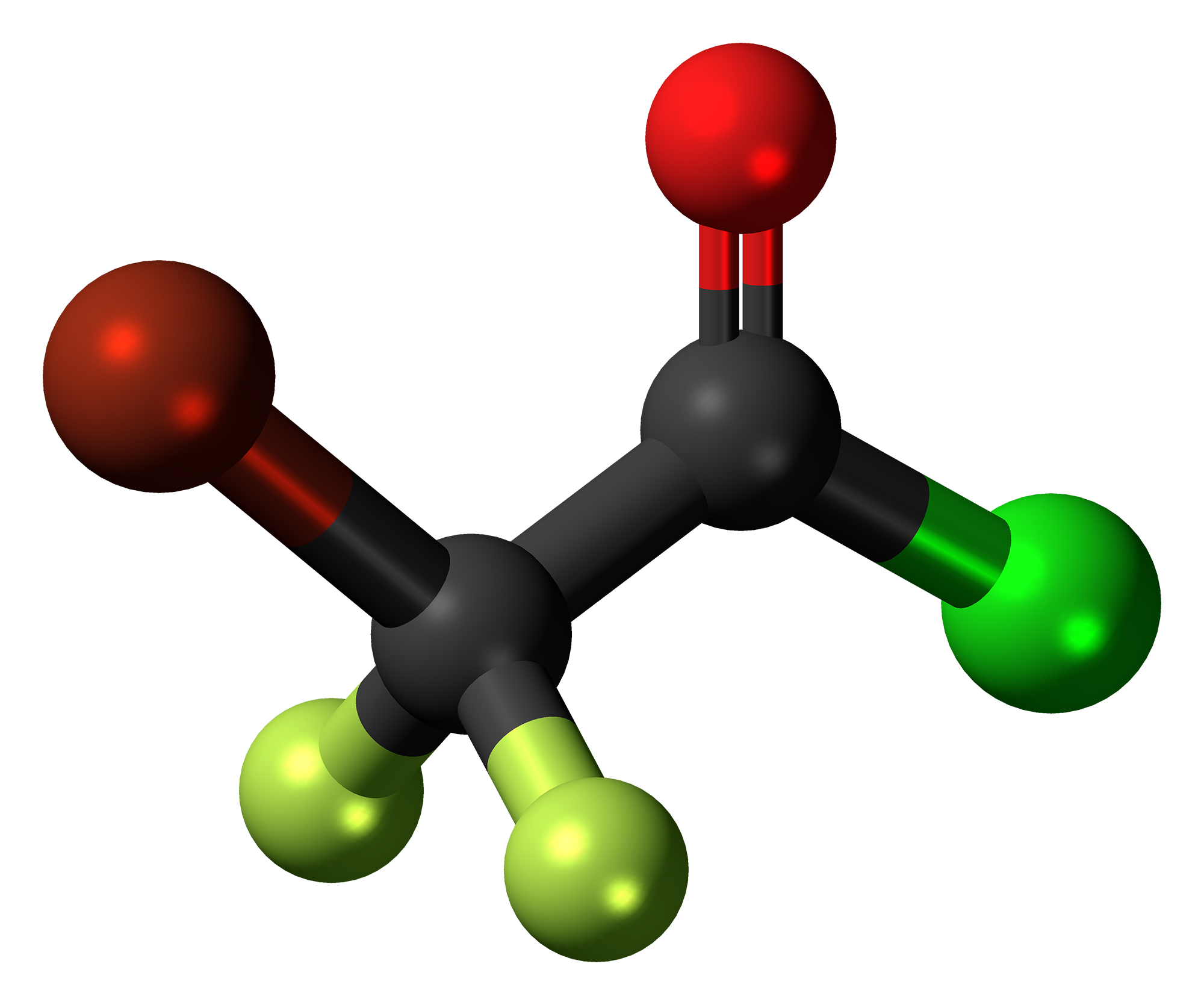

Names
- Preferred IUPAC name Bromodi(fluoro)acetyl chloride
- Other names 2-Bromo-2,2-difluoroacetyl chloride 2-Bromo-2,2-difluoro-ethanoyl chloride

Identifiers
CAS Number	3832-48-2
3D model (JSmol)	Interactive image
ChemSpider	454349
ECHA InfoCard	100.197.413
EC Number	671-811-0
PubChem CID	520892
CompTox Dashboard (EPA)	DTXSID90334487
- InChI: InChI=1S/C2BrClF2O/c3-2(5,6)1(4)7 Key: LYJKGSALBRSKNL-UHFFFAOYSA-N; InChI=1/C2BrClF2O/c3-2(5,6)1(4)7 Key: LYJKGSALBRSKNL-UHFFFAOYAW
- SMILES: C(=O)(C(F)(F)Br)Cl

Properties
Chemical formula	C_{2}BrClF_{2}O
Molar mass	193.37 g·mol^{−1}
Appearance	liquid
Boiling point	50 °C (122 °F; 323 K)

Hazards
- GHS labelling
Pictograms	(GHS02: Flammable) (GHS05: Corrosive)
Signal word	Danger
Hazard statements	H226, H314
Precautionary statements	P210, P233, P240, P241, P242, P243, P260, P264, P280, P301+P330+P331, P303+P361+P353, P304+P340, P305+P351+P338, P310, P321, P363, P370+P378, P403+P235, P405, P501
- Safety data sheet (SDS)
- Except where otherwise noted, data are given for materials in their standard state (at 25 °C [77 °F], 100 kPa). verify (what is ?) Infobox references

Bromodifluoroacetyl chloride is a chemical compound with the formula BrCF_{2}COCl. It has been used as a starting material for the synthesis of (biologically active) α,α-difluoro-γ-lactams and has been used in the synthesis of trifluoromethylated C-nucleosides.

== See also ==
- Acetyl chloride
- Trifluoroacetic acid
