= Nitroethylene =

- Nitroethylene

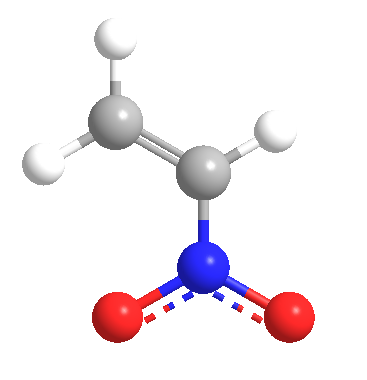

Names
- Preferred IUPAC name Nitroethene

Identifiers
CAS Number	3638-64-0
3D model (JSmol)	Interactive image
Beilstein Reference	1209274
ChEBI	CHEBI:51131
ChemSpider	69627
Gmelin Reference	130431
PubChem CID	77197
UNII	7UX2R356BG
CompTox Dashboard (EPA)	DTXSID0075235
- InChI: InChI=1S/C2H3NO2/c1-2-3(4)5/h2H,1H2
- SMILES: C=C[N+](=O)[O-]

Properties
Chemical formula	C_{2}H_{3}NO_{2}
Molar mass	73.051 g·mol^{−1}
Appearance	liquid
Density	1.073 g cm^{−3}
Melting point	−55 °C (−67 °F; 218 K)
Boiling point	98.5 °C (209.3 °F; 371.6 K)
Solubility in water	78.9 g L^{−1}
Solubility in ethanol, acetone, and benzene	very soluble
log P	−1.702
Vapor pressure	45.8 mmHg

Hazards
Flash point	23.2 °C (73.8 °F; 296.3 K)
Safety data sheet (SDS)	External MSDS

Thermochemistry
Heat capacity (C)	73.7 J mol^{−1} K^{−1}
Std molar entropy (S^{⦵}_{298})	324 J mol^{−1} K^{−1}
Std enthalpy of formation (Δ_{f}H^{⦵}_{298})	56 kJ mol^{−1}
- Except where otherwise noted, data are given for materials in their standard state (at 25 °C [77 °F], 100 kPa). Infobox references

Nitroethylene (also known as nitroethene) is a liquid organic compound with the formula C_{2}H_{3}NO_{2}. It is the simplest nitroalkene, which are unsaturated carbon chains with at least one double bond and a NO_{2} functional group. Nitroethylene serves as a useful intermediate in the production of various other chemicals.

== Properties ==
Nitroethylene has a dipole moment from the electron withdrawing nitro group present in the molecule, even though it is a neutral species. As a result, it is soluble in water and non-polar solvents. Nitroethylene is extremely reactive, even at low temperatures. It readily decomposes at room temperature. In sharp contrast to reports that highlight its instability, however, it has been found to be stable as a standard solution in benzene for at least 6 months when stored in a refrigerator (−10 °C).

== Production ==
Nitroethene can be produced by reacting nitromethane with formaldehyde or paraformaldehyde (a polymeric form) to form 2-nitroethanol. Nitroethanol undergoes an acid-catalyzed dehydration reaction, especially if heated:

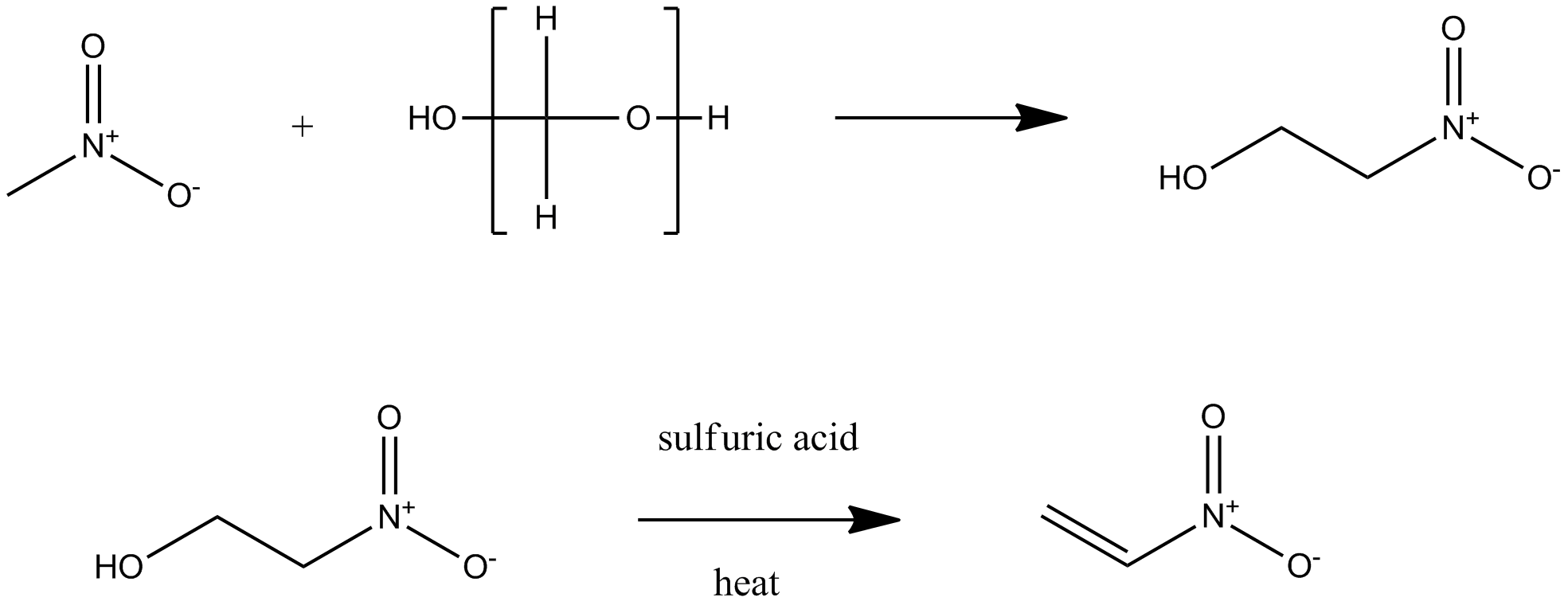
Preparation of nitroethylene

== Reactions ==
Nitroethylene is a very electron deficient molecule. As a result, nitroethylene usually acts as the electrophile in reactions. Nitroethylene is capable of reacting spontaneously at temperatures as low as −100 °C, often as endothermic reactions. Common reactions for this molecule are cycloadditions, radical additions, and nucleophilic additions.

=== Cycloaddition ===
Nitroethylene can act at the 2π electron source in a [4+2] cycloaddition. The nitro group in the molecule serves as an electron withdrawing group that makes the molecule a good candidate as a dienophile. It readily forms an adduct with cyclopentadiene, spiroheptadiene, and their derivatives in a [4+2] cycloaddition.

Nitroethene can react at the 2π electron source in a [3+2] cycloaddition with nitrones.

Nitroethylene is also reactive in domino-cycloaddition processes. For example, they can initially react with a chiral vinyl ether, and then react in a [3+2] cycloaddition with an electron deficient alkene such as dimethyl fumarate. The reactions are almost spontaneous at −78 °C.

=== Radical polymerization ===
At very low temperatures (i.e. −78 °C), nitroethylene can polymerize with itself through initiation by one of its lone pairs. This process can be moderated by using t-butyl solvent. Research has been conducted on performing batch polymerization at room temperature in THF solvent. This process requires gamma ray irradiation for initiation. Termination of the polymerization requires a radical retardant, such as hydrogen bromide or hydrogen chloride. Water must be carefully removed prior to the polymerization, as nitroethylene is sensitive to polymerization by traces of water.

=== Addition and Reduction ===
In addition to standard nucleophilic addition reactions on the C=C bond, nitroethylene can serve as a Michael acceptor in a Michael addition reaction. A typical Michael donor (i.e. ketone or aldehyde) can be used. Like most nitro compounds, a platinum/palladium catalyzed reaction with hydrogen gas can reduce the nitro group to an amine group.

Another example is the Michael reaction of indole and nitroethylene.

== Uses ==
The main use of nitroethylene is as an intermediate reagent in chemical synthesis. One example is the production of N-(2-nitroethyl)-aniline with aniline at room temperature. The reaction utilizes benzene as a solvent and proceeds to about 90% yield in 12 hours.

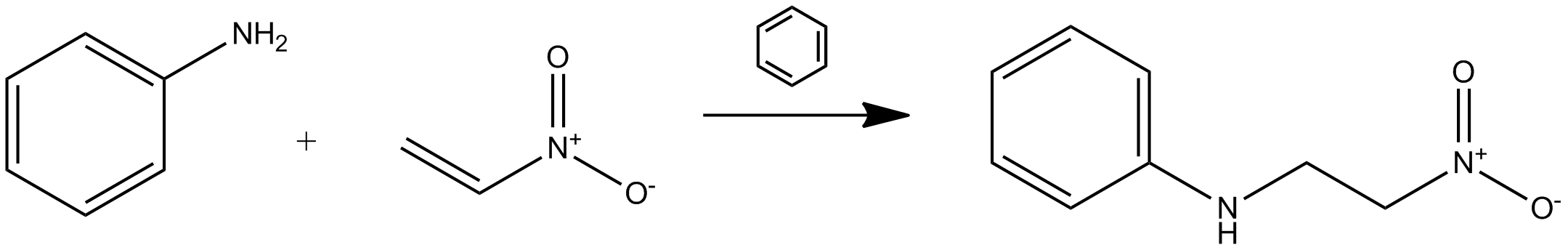
Reaction of nitroethylene and aniline

Another example of nitroethylene is from the coupling reaction with a vinyl Grignard reagent and a silyl glyoxalate to form a nitrocylopentanol. This process via a Henry reaction and is highly diastereoselective.

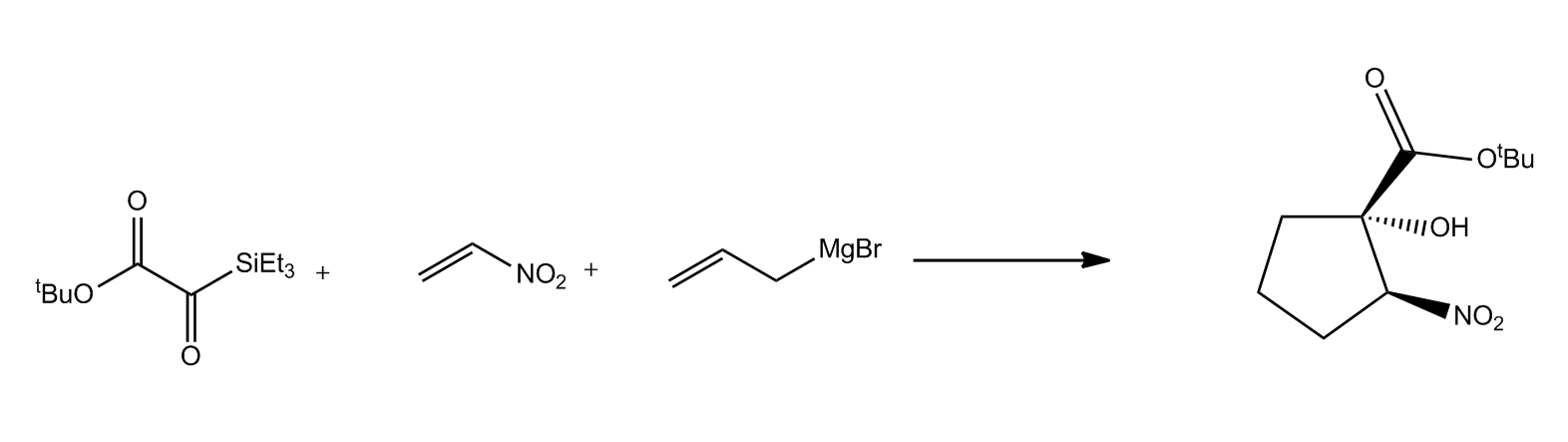
Nitroethylene coupling reaction with a vinyl Grignard and a silyl glyoxalate
