= Bromal hydrate =

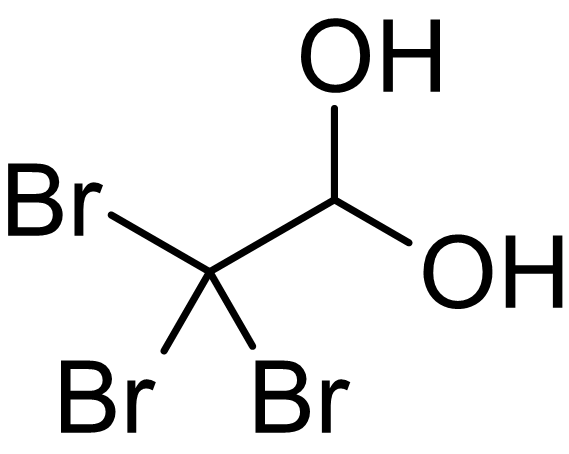

Names
- IUPAC name 2,2,2-Tribromo-1,1-ethanediol
- Other names tribromoethylidene glycol

Identifiers
CAS Number	507-42-6
3D model (JSmol)	Interactive image
ChemSpider	61488
ECHA InfoCard	100.007.340
EC Number	208-073-2
PubChem CID	68181
UNII	BQU83Q7216
CompTox Dashboard (EPA)	DTXSID20198751
- InChI: InChI=1S/C2H3Br3O2/c3-2(4,5)1(6)7/h1,6-7H Key: NJHVMXFNIZTTBV-UHFFFAOYSA-N
- SMILES: C(C(Br)(Br)Br)(O)O

Properties
Chemical formula	C_{2}H_{3}Br_{3}O_{2}
Molar mass	298.756 g·mol^{−1}
Appearance	white crystalline solid with bromal-like smell and taste
Melting point	53.5 °C (128.3 °F; 326.6 K)
Solubility in water	Soluble
Solubility	Soluble in ethanol, Diethyl ether, chloroform and Glycerin

Hazards
- GHS labelling
Pictograms	(GHS07: Exclamation mark)
Signal word	Warning
Hazard statements	H302, H315, H319, H335
Precautionary statements	P261, P264, P264+P265, P270, P271, P280, P301+P317, P302+P352, P304+P340, P305+P351+P338, P319, P321, P330, P332+P317, P337+P317, P362+P364, P403+P233, P405, P501
- Except where otherwise noted, data are given for materials in their standard state (at 25 °C [77 °F], 100 kPa). Infobox references

Bromal hydrate is an organobromine compound with the chemical formula C_{2}H_{3}Br_{3}O_{2}. It is the bromine analogue of chloral hydrate. Bromal hydrate forms when bromal is reacted with water. It decomposes to bromal and water upon distillation. It has hypnotic and analgesic properties but acts like a stimulant at lower doses. Bromal hydrate is more physiologically active than its chlorine analogue, chloral hydrate. Its direct effect on the heart muscles is stronger than that of chloral hydrate. Its analgesic effects were attributed to the proposed metabolism to bromoform.

It was also tried as a medication for epilepsy, but was found ineffective.
