= Chloral hydrate =

Chemical sedative and hypnotic drug

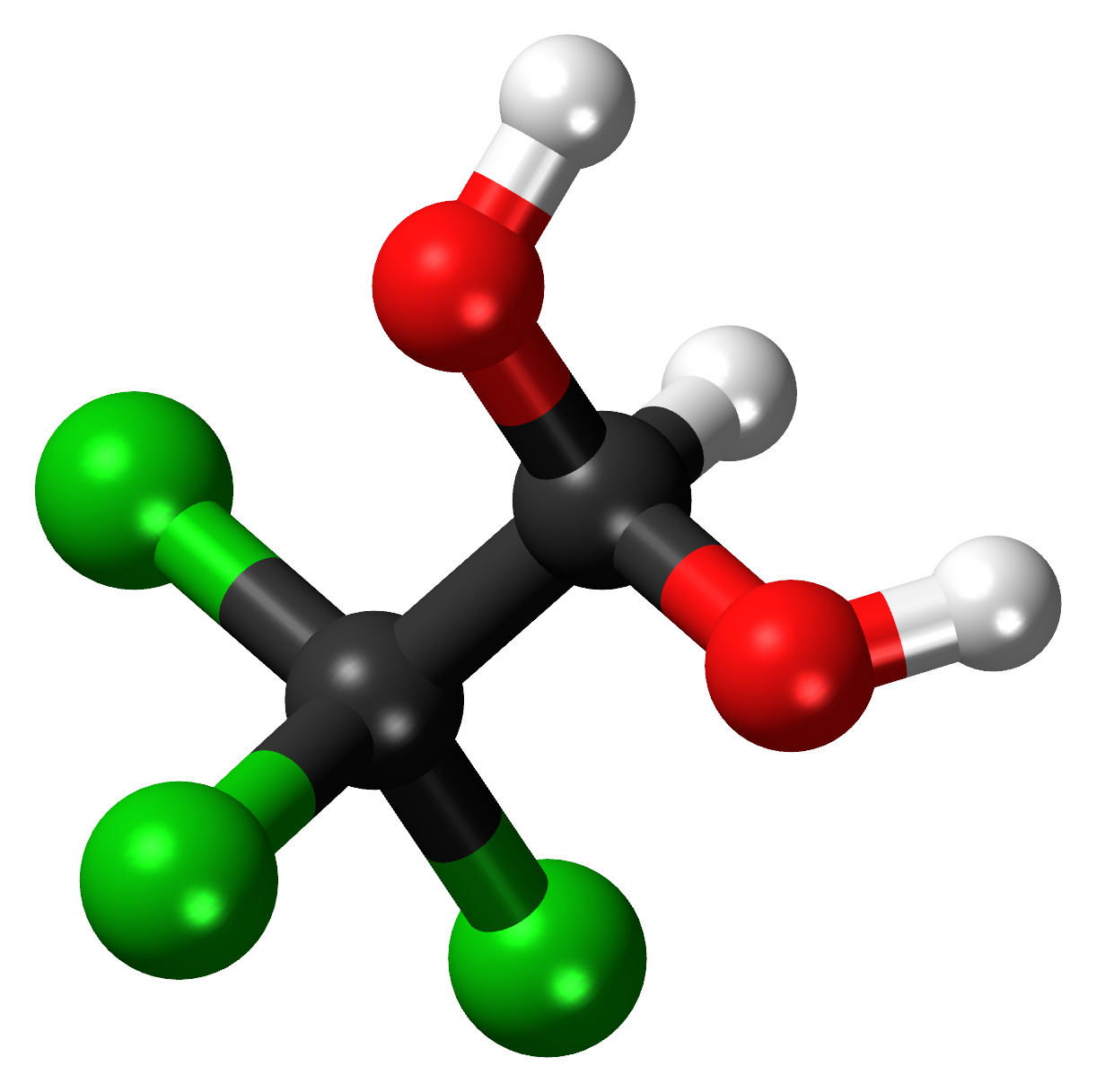
Carbon, C
Chlorine, Cl
Oxygen, O
Hydrogen, H
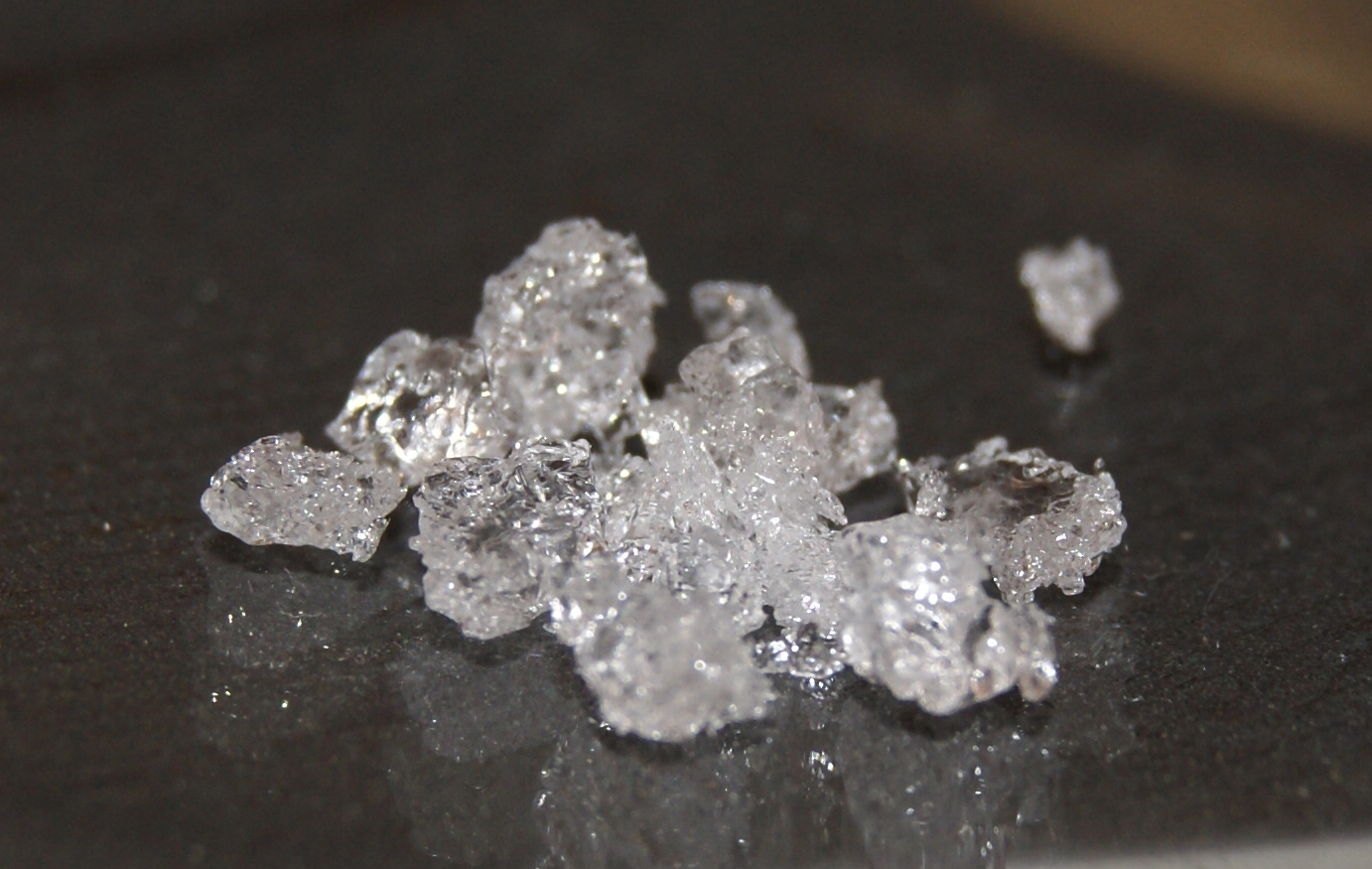

Names
- Preferred IUPAC name 2,2,2-Trichloroethane-1,1-diol
- Other names: Trichloroacetaldehyde monohydrate; Chlorali hydras; Tradenames: Aquachloral; Chloradorm; Chloratol; Noctec; Novo-Chlorhydrate; Somnos; Somnote

Identifiers
CAS Number	302-17-0
3D model (JSmol)	Interactive image
Beilstein Reference	1698497
ChEBI	CHEBI:28142
ChEMBL	ChEMBL455917
ChemSpider	2606
DrugBank	DB01563
ECHA InfoCard	100.005.562
EC Number	206-117-5
Gmelin Reference	101369
KEGG	D00265
PubChem CID	2707
RTECS number	FM875000
UNII	418M5916WG
UN number	2811
CompTox Dashboard (EPA)	DTXSID7020261
- InChI: InChI=1S/C2H3Cl3O2/c3-2(4,5)1(6)7/h1,6-7H Key: RNFNDJAIBTYOQL-UHFFFAOYSA-N; InChI=1/C2H3Cl3O2/c3-2(4,5)1(6)7/h1,6-7H Key: RNFNDJAIBTYOQL-UHFFFAOYAY
- SMILES: ClC(Cl)(Cl)C(O)O

Properties
Chemical formula	CCl_{3}CH(OH)_{2}
Molar mass	165.39 g·mol^{−1}
Appearance	Colourless solid
Odor	Aromatic, slightly acrid
Density	1.9081 g/cm^{3}
Melting point	57 °C (135 °F; 330 K)
Boiling point	98 °C (208 °F; 371 K) (decomposes)
Solubility in water	660 g/(100 ml)
Solubility	Very soluble in benzene, ethyl ether, ethanol
log P	0.99
Acidity (pK_{a})	9.66, 11.0

Structure
Crystal structure	Monoclinic

Pharmacology
ATC code	N05CC01 (WHO)
Routes of administration	Oral syrup, rectal suppository
- Pharmacokinetics
Bioavailability	Well absorbed
Metabolism	Hepatic and renal (converted to trichloroethanol)
Biological half-life	8–10 hours
Excretion	Bile, feces, urine (various metabolites not unchanged)
Legal status	BR: Class C1 (Other controlled substances); CA: Unscheduled; US: Schedule IV

Hazards
- GHS labelling
Pictograms	(GHS06: Toxic) (GHS07: Exclamation mark)
Signal word	Danger
Hazard statements	H301, H315, H319
Precautionary statements	P264, P270, P280, P301+P310, P302+P352, P305+P351+P338, P321, P330, P332+P313, P337+P313, P362, P405, P501
- Lethal dose or concentration (LD, LC)
LD_{50} (median dose)	1100 mg/kg (oral)
Safety data sheet (SDS)	External MSDS

Related compounds
Related compounds	Chloral, chlorobutanol, triclofos
- Except where otherwise noted, data are given for materials in their standard state (at 25 °C [77 °F], 100 kPa). Infobox references

Chloral hydrate is a geminal diol with the formula Cl_{3}C−CH(OH)_{2}. It was first used as a sedative and hypnotic in Germany in the 1870s. Over time it was replaced by safer and more effective alternatives but it remained in use in the United States until at least the 1970s. It sometimes finds usage as a laboratory chemical reagent and precursor. It is derived from chloral (trichloroacetaldehyde) by the addition of one equivalent of water.

== Uses ==
=== Hypnotic ===
Chloral hydrate has not been approved by the FDA in the United States nor the EMA in the European Union for any medical indication and is on the FDA list of unapproved drugs that are still prescribed by clinicians. Usage of the drug as a sedative or hypnotic may carry some risk given the lack of clinical trials. However, chloral hydrate products, licensed for short-term management of severe insomnia, are available in the United Kingdom. Chloral hydrate was voluntarily removed from the market by all manufacturers in the United States in 2012. Prior to that, chloral hydrate may have been sold as a "legacy" or "grandfathered" drug; that is, a drug that existed prior to the time certain FDA regulations took effect and therefore, some pharmaceutical companies have argued, has never required FDA approval. New drugs did not have to be approved for safety until Congress passed the Federal Food, Drug, and Cosmetic Act (the "FD&C Act") in 1938. Further, a new drug did not have to be proven effective until 1962, when Congress amended the Act. Manufacturers contend that such "legacy drugs", by virtue of the fact that they have been prescribed for decades, have gained a history of safety and efficacy.

Chloral hydrate was used for the short-term treatment of insomnia and as a sedative before minor medical or dental treatment. It was largely displaced in the mid-20th century by barbiturates and subsequently by benzodiazepines. It was also formerly used in veterinary medicine as a general anesthetic but is not considered acceptable for anesthesia or euthanasia of small animals owing to adverse effects. It is also still used as a sedative prior to EEG procedures, as it is one of the few available sedatives that do not suppress epileptiform discharges.

In therapeutic doses for insomnia, chloral hydrate is effective within 20 to 60 minutes. In humans it is metabolized within 7 hours into trichloroethanol and trichloroethanol glucuronide by erythrocytes and plasma esterases and into trichloroacetic acid in 4 to 5 days. It has a very narrow therapeutic window making this drug difficult to use. Higher doses can depress respiration and blood pressure. Tolerance to the drug develops after a few days of use.

=== In organic synthesis ===
Chloral hydrate is a starting point for the synthesis of other organic compounds. It is the starting material for the production of chloral, which is produced by the distillation of a mixture of chloral hydrate and sulfuric acid, which serves as the desiccant.

Notably, it is used to synthesize isatin. In this synthesis, chloral hydrate reacts with aniline and hydroxylamine to give a condensation product which cyclicizes in sulfuric acid to give the target compound:

Moreover, chloral hydrate is used as a reagent for the deprotection of acetals, dithioacetals and tetrahydropyranyl ethers in organic solvents.

The compound can be crystallized in a variety of polymorphs.

=== Botany and mycology ===
==== Hoyer's mounting medium ====
Chloral hydrate is also an ingredient used for Hoyer's solution, a mounting medium for microscopic observation of diverse plant types such as bryophytes, ferns, seeds, and small arthropods (especially mites). Other ingredients may include gum arabic and glycerol. An advantage of this medium includes a high refractive index and clearing (macerating) properties of small specimens (especially advantageous if specimens require observation with differential interference contrast microscopy).

Because of its status as a regulated substance, chloral hydrate can be difficult to obtain. This has led to chloral hydrate being replaced by alternative reagents in microscopy procedures.

==== Melzer's reagent ====
Chloral hydrate is an ingredient used to make Melzer's reagent, an aqueous solution that is used to identify certain species of fungi. The other ingredients are potassium iodide, and iodine. Whether tissue or spores react to this reagent is vital for the correct identification of some mushrooms.

== Safety ==
Chloral hydrate was routinely administered in gram quantities. Prolonged exposure to its vapors is unhealthy, with an LD_{50} for 4-hour exposure of 440 mg/m^{3}. Long-term use of chloral hydrate is associated with a rapid development of tolerance to its effects and possible addiction as well as adverse effects including rashes, gastric discomfort and severe kidney, heart, and liver failure.

Acute overdosage is often characterized by nausea, vomiting, confusion, convulsions, slow and irregular breathing, cardiac arrhythmia, and coma. The plasma, serum or blood concentrations of chloral hydrate and/or trichloroethanol, its major active metabolite, may be measured to confirm a diagnosis of poisoning in hospitalized patients or to aid in the forensic investigation of fatalities. Accidental overdosage of young children undergoing simple dental or surgical procedures has occurred. Hemodialysis has been used successfully to accelerate clearance of the drug in poisoning victims. It is listed as having a "conditional risk" of causing torsades de pointes.

== Production ==
Chloral hydrate is produced from chlorine and ethanol in acidic solution.

4 Cl_{2} + CH_{3}CH_{2}OH + H_{2}O → Cl_{3}C−CH(OH)_{2} + 5 HCl

In basic conditions the haloform reaction takes place and chloral hydrate is decomposed by hydrolysis to form chloroform.

== Pharmacology ==
=== Pharmacodynamics ===
Chloral hydrate is metabolized in vivo to trichloroethanol, which is responsible for secondary physiological and psychological effects. The metabolite of chloral hydrate exerts its pharmacological properties via enhancing the GABA receptor complex and therefore is similar in action to benzodiazepines, nonbenzodiazepines and barbiturates. It can be moderately addictive, as chronic use is known to cause dependency and withdrawal symptoms. The chemical can potentiate various anticoagulants and is weakly mutagenic in vitro and in vivo.

Chloral hydrate inhibits liver alcohol dehydrogenase in vitro. This could be an explanation of the synergeric effect seen with alcohol.

Chloral hydrate is structurally and somewhat pharmacodynamically similar to ethchlorvynol, a pharmaceutical developed during the 1950s that was marketed as both a sedative and a hypnotic under the trade name Placidyl. In 1999, Abbott, the sole manufacturer of the drug in the United States at the time, decided to discontinue the product. After Abbott ceased production, the drug remained available for about a year. Despite the fact that it could have been manufactured generically, no other company in the United States chose to do so.

=== Pharmacokinetics ===
Chloral hydrate is metabolized to both 2,2,2-trichloroethanol (TCE) and trichloroacetic acid (TCA) by alcohol dehydrogenase. TCE is further converted to its glucoronide. Dichloroacetic acid (DCA) has been detected as a metabolite in children, but how it gets made is unknown. TCE glucoronide, TCA, and a very small amount of free TCE are excreted in urine in male human adults. This study did not detect significant amounts of DCA; the authors noted that DCA can form during inappropriate sample preparation. Both TCA and DCA cause liver tumors in mice.

TCA is cleared by the kidneys at a rate slower than the expected filtration rate, suggesting that efficient reabsorption of filtered-out TCA happens.

== Legal status ==
In the United States, chloral hydrate is a schedule IV controlled substance and requires a physician's prescription. Its properties have sometimes led to its use as a date rape drug. The phrase, "slipping a mickey," originally referred specifically to adding chloral hydrate to a person's (alcoholic) drink without the person's knowledge.

== History ==
Chloral hydrate was first synthesized by the chemist Justus von Liebig in 1832 at the University of Giessen. Liebig discovered the molecule when a chlorination (halogenation) reaction was performed on ethanol. Its sedative properties were observed by Rudolf Buchheim in 1861, but described in detail and published only in 1869 by Oscar Liebreich; subsequently, because of its easy synthesis, its use became widespread. Through experimentation, physiologist Claude Bernard clarified that the chloral hydrate was hypnotic as opposed to an analgesic. It was the first of a long line of sedatives, most notably the barbiturates, manufactured and marketed by the German pharmaceutical industry. Historically, chloral hydrate was utilized primarily as a psychiatric medication. In 1869, German physician and pharmacologist Oscar Liebreich began to promote its use to calm anxiety, especially when it caused insomnia. Chloral hydrate had certain advantages over morphine for this application, as it worked quickly without injection and had a consistent strength.

The compound achieved wide use in both asylums and the homes of those socially refined enough to avoid asylums. Upper- and middle-class women, well-represented in the latter category, were particularly susceptible to chloral hydrate addiction. After the 1904 invention of barbital, the first of the barbiturate family, chloral hydrate began to disappear from use among those with means. It remained common in asylums and hospitals until the Second World War as it was quite cheap. Chloral hydrate had some other important advantages that kept it in use for five decades despite the existence of more advanced barbiturates. It was the safest available sedative until the middle of the twentieth century, and thus was particularly favored for children. It also left patients much more refreshed after a deep sleep than more recently invented sedatives. Its frequency of use made it an early and regular feature in The Merck Manual.

Chloral hydrate was also a significant object of study in various early pharmacological experiments. In 1875, Claude Bernard tried to determine if chloral hydrate exerted its action through a metabolic conversion to chloroform. This was not only the first attempt to determine whether different drugs were converted to the same metabolite in the body but also the first to measure the concentration of a particular pharmaceutical in the blood. The results were inconclusive. In 1899 and 1901 Hans Horst Meyer and Ernest Overton respectively made the major discovery that the general anaesthetic action of a drug was strongly correlated to its lipid solubility. However, chloral hydrate was quite polar but nonetheless a potent hypnotic. Overton was unable to explain this mystery. Thus, chloral hydrate remained one of the major and persistent exceptions to this breakthrough discovery in pharmacology. This anomaly was eventually resolved in 1948, when Claude Bernard's experiment was repeated. While chloral hydrate was converted to a different metabolite than chloroform, it was found that it was converted into the more lipophilic molecule 2,2,2-trichloroethanol. This metabolite fit much better with the Meyer–Overton correlation than chloral had. Prior to this, it had not been demonstrated that general anesthetics could undergo chemical changes to exert their action in the body.

Chloral hydrate was the first hypnotic to be used intravenously as a general anesthetic. In 1871, Pierre-Cyprien Oré began experiments on animals, followed by humans. While a state of general anesthesia could be achieved, the technique never caught on because its administration was more complex and less safe than the oral administration of chloral hydrate, and less safe for intravenous use than later general anesthetics were found to be.

== Society and culture ==
Chloral hydrate was used as one of the earliest synthetic drugs to treat insomnia. In 1912, Bayer introduced the drug phenobarbital under the brand name Luminal. In the 1930s, pentobarbital and secobarbital (better known by their original brand names Nembutal and Seconal, respectively) were synthesized. Chloral hydrate was still prescribed, although its predominance as a sedative and a hypnotic was largely eclipsed by barbiturates.

Chloral hydrate is soluble in both water and ethanol, readily forming concentrated solutions. A solution of chloral hydrate in ethanol called "knockout drops" was used to prepare a Mickey Finn.

In Bram Stoker's 1897 novel Dracula, the (fictional) psychiatrist John Seward is the administrator of an insane asylum in England. In his diary, he mentions his use of chloral hydrate as a sleeping aid and taking care to avoid becoming dependent, and also records the molecular formula:

I am weary tonight and low in spirits. I cannot but think of Lucy, and how different things might have been. If I don't sleep at once, chloral, the modern Morpheus—C_{2}HCl_{3}O·H_{2}O! I must be careful not to let it grow into a habit. No, I shall take none tonight! I have thought of Lucy, and I shall not dishonour her by mixing the two.

In the conclusion of Edith Wharton's 1905 novel The House of Mirth, Lily Bart, the novel's heroine, becomes addicted to chloral hydrate and overdoses on the substance:

She put out her hand, and measured the soothing drops into a glass; but as she did so, she knew they would be powerless against the supernatural lucidity of her brain. She had long since raised the dose to its highest limit, but to-night she felt she must increase it. She knew she took a slight risk in doing so—she remembered the chemist's warning. If sleep came at all, it might be a sleep without waking.

In the James Bond films From Russia With Love and The Living Daylights, chloral hydrate is used as a knockout drug.

== Notable users ==
- King Chulalongkorn of Thailand (1853–1910) used the drug for a period after 1893 to relieve what may have been a mix of depression and unspecified illnesses. He was reported by his doctor to have been taking one bottle per day during July 1894 although this was reduced after this time.
- Montgomery Clift (1920–1966), American actor.
- André Gide (1869–1951) was given chloral hydrate as a boy for sleep problems by a physician named Lizart. Gide states in his autobiography If It Die... that "all my later weaknesses of will or memory I attribute to him."
- William James (1842–1910), psychologist and philosopher, used the drug for insomnia and sedation due to chronic neurosis.
- The Jonestown mass murder-suicides in 1978 involved the communal drinking of Flavor Aid poisoned with diazepam, chloral hydrate, cyanide, and promethazine.
- Mary Todd Lincoln (1818–1882), wife of American president Abraham Lincoln, became addicted in the years after her husband's death and was committed to an asylum.
- Marilyn Monroe (1926–1962) died from an overdose of chloral hydrate and pentobarbital (Nembutal).
- Friedrich Nietzsche (1844–1900) regularly used chloral hydrate in the years leading up to his nervous breakdown, according to Lou Salomé and other associates. Whether the drug contributed to his insanity is a point of controversy.
- Dante Gabriel Rossetti (1828–1882) became addicted to chloral, with whisky chasers, after the death of his wife Elizabeth Siddal from a laudanum overdose in 1862. He had a mental breakdown in 1872. He lived out the last ten years of his life addicted to chloral and alcohol, in part to mask the pain of botched surgery to an enlarged testicle in 1877.
- Oliver Sacks (1933–2015) abused chloral hydrate in 1965 as a depressed insomniac. He found himself taking fifteen times the usual dose of chloral hydrate every night before he eventually ran out, causing violent withdrawal symptoms.
- Anna Nicole Smith (1967–2007) died of "combined drug intoxication" with chloral hydrate as the "major component".
- John Tyndall (1820–1893), an Irish physicist, died of an accidental overdose of chloral administered by his wife.
- Evelyn Waugh (1903–1966), insomniac for much of his adult life, for which "in later life ... he became so deleteriously dependent on chloral". Waugh's novel, The Ordeal of Gilbert Pinfold, is largely a fictionalised account of an episode Waugh himself experienced as a result of excessive use of chloral in combination with bromide and alcohol. Waugh's friend and biographer Christopher Sykes observed that Waugh's description of D. G. Rossetti's demise under the effects of excessive use of chloral in his 1928 biography of the artist "is a fairly exact description of how [Waugh's own] life ended in 1966".
- Country music singer Hank Williams (1923–1953) died from a combination of chloral hydrate, morphine and whiskey.
- Renée Vivien (1877-1909), a prominent lesbian poet during the Belle Époque, abused chloral hydrate for much of her life.

== Environmental ==
Chloral hydrate is, together with chloroform, a minor side-product of the chlorination of water when organic residues such as humic acids are present. It has been detected in drinking water at concentrations of up to 100 micrograms per litre (μg/L) but concentrations are normally found to be below 10 μg/L. Levels are generally found to be higher in surface water than in ground water.

== See also ==
- Chloral cyanohydrin
- Chlorobutanol
- Disulfiram-like drug
- TaClo, metabolite and neurotoxin
- Trichloroethylene, industrial chemical that metabolizes to chloral hydrate
