= Dichloroacetaldehyde =

Names
- IUPAC name 2,2-dichloroethanal
- Other names dichloroethanal

Identifiers
CAS Number	79-02-7
3D model (JSmol)	Interactive image
ChEBI	CHEBI:34214
ChemSpider	21106511
ECHA InfoCard	100.001.063
EC Number	201-169-5
KEGG	C14858
PubChem CID	6576
UNII	9GT3DHH725
UN number	1993
CompTox Dashboard (EPA)	DTXSID3021560
- InChI: InChI=1S/C2H2Cl2O/c3-2(4)1-5/h1-2H Key: NWQWQKUXRJYXFH-UHFFFAOYSA-N
- SMILES: C(=O)C(Cl)Cl

Properties
Chemical formula	C_{2}H_{2}Cl_{2}O
Molar mass	112.94 g·mol^{−1}
Density	1.4 g/mL
Melting point	−50 °C (−58 °F; 223 K)
Boiling point	88 °C (190 °F; 361 K)
Solubility in water	forms hydrate

Hazards
- GHS labelling
Pictograms	(GHS05: Corrosive) (GHS06: Toxic) (GHS07: Exclamation mark) (GHS08: Health hazard) (GHS09: Environmental hazard)
Signal word	Danger
Hazard statements	H301, H310, H314, H330, H335, H351, H400
Precautionary statements	P203, P260, P262, P264, P264+P265, P270, P271, P273, P280, P284, P301+P316, P301+P330+P331, P302+P352, P302+P361+P354, P304+P340, P305+P354+P338, P316, P317, P318, P319, P320, P321, P330, P361+P364, P363, P391, P403+P233, P405, P501

Related compounds
Related compounds	chloroacetaldehyde, trichloroacetaldehyde
- Except where otherwise noted, data are given for materials in their standard state (at 25 °C [77 °F], 100 kPa). Infobox references

Dichloroacetaldehyde is a chlorinated aldehyde with the chemical formula HCCl_{2}CHO. Along with monochloroacetaldehyde and trichloroacetaldehyde, it is one of the three possible chlorinated acetaldehydes.

== Properties and reactions ==
Dichloroacetaldehyde is a highly volatile liquid that is easily soluble in water to form Hydrates. A geminal diol, also known as monohydrate, 2,2-dichloro-1,1-ethanediol, is formed in water.

The compound decomposes when heated. In the presence of Lewis acids such as antimony trichloride, iron(III) chloride, aluminum trichloride, tin(IV) chloride or boron trifluoride, the trimer hexachloroparaldehyde (2,4,6-tris(dichloromethyl)-1,3,5-trioxane) can be obtained. The trimer forms colourless crystals that melt at 131–132 °C. At the boiling point of 210–220 °C, dichloroacetaldehyde decomposes.

Reduction with lithium aluminium hydride gives dichloroethanol.

== Uses ==
Dichloroacetaldehyde is used to produce other chemical compounds such as mitotane. Condensation with chlorobenzene yields p,p′-dichloro-1,1-diphenyl-2,2-dichloroethane, which was previously used as an insecticide:

== Synthesis ==
Dichloroacetaldehyde can be obtained by chlorinating acetaldehyde or paraldehyde. Hypochlorination of 1,2-dichloroethylene using chlorine and water produces pure dichloroacetaldehyde.
