= 2-Chloroethyl chloroformate =

Names
- Preferred IUPAC name 2-Chloroethyl carbonochloridate
- Other names β-chloroethyl chloroformate

Identifiers
CAS Number	627-11-2
3D model (JSmol)	Interactive image
ChemSpider	11802
ECHA InfoCard	100.009.985
EC Number	210-982-4
PubChem CID	12305
UNII	4D32H07Z9I
UN number	3277
CompTox Dashboard (EPA)	DTXSID2060832
- InChI: InChI=1S/C3H4Cl2O2/c4-1-2-7-3(5)6/h1-2H2 Key: SVDDJQGVOFZBNX-UHFFFAOYSA-N
- SMILES: ClC(=O)OCCCl

Properties
Chemical formula	C_{3}H_{4}Cl_{2}O_{2}
Molar mass	142.96 g·mol^{−1}
Appearance	colourless liquid
Odor	pungent
Density	1.3847 g/cm^{3}
Boiling point	155 °C (311 °F; 428 K)
Refractive index (n_{D})	1.4483

Hazards
- GHS labelling
Pictograms	(GHS05: Corrosive) (GHS06: Toxic) (GHS07: Exclamation mark)
Signal word	Danger
Hazard statements	H301, H314, H315, H319, H331, H335
Precautionary statements	P260, P264, P264+P265, P270, P271, P280, P301+P316, P301+P330+P331, P302+P352, P302+P361+P354, P304+P340, P305+P351+P338, P305+P354+P338, P316, P319, P321, P330, P332+P317, P337+P317, P362+P364, P363, P403+P233, P405, P501
Flash point	70 °C (158 °F; 343 K)
- Safety data sheet (SDS)

Related compounds
Related chloroformates	1-Chloroethyl chloroformate; Chloromethyl chloroformate; Ethyl chloroformate
- Except where otherwise noted, data are given for materials in their standard state (at 25 °C [77 °F], 100 kPa). Infobox references

2-Chloroethyl chloroformate is an organochlorine compound with the chemical formula ClCOOCH_{2}CH_{2}Cl. It is a colourless liquid with a pungent odor. It has a structure consisting of ethyl chloroformate with a chlorine atom as a substituent on the position 2 on the ethyl group.

== Synthesis ==
2-Chloroethyl chloroformate is the sole product of the reaction between ethylene oxide and phosgene in the presence of a small amount of pyridine.

== Uses ==
2-Chloroethyl chloroformate is commonly used as a reagent, especially for making derivatives of amines and carboxylic acids for analysis by gas chromatography.
