= C3H5ClO2 =

The molecular formula C_{3}H_{5}ClO_{2} (molar mass: 108.52 g/mol, exact mass: 107.9978 u) may refer to:

- 2-Chloropropionic acid, or 2-chloropropanoic acid
- Ethyl chloroformate
- UMB66
