= C2H3ClO2 =

The molecular formula C_{2}H_{3}ClO_{2} may refer to:

- Chloroacetic acid, organochlorine carboxylic acid and building-block in organic synthesis
- Methyl chloroformate, the methyl ester of chloroformic acid
