= Α-Halo carboxylic acids and esters =

α-Halo carboxylic acids and esters are organic compounds with the respective formulas RCHXCO_{2}H and RCHXCO_{2}R' where R and R' are organic substituents. The X in these compounds is a halide, usually chloride and bromide. These compounds are often used as intermediates in the preparation of more elaborate derivatives. They are often potent alkylating agents. The mono halide derivatives are chiral.

== Preparation ==
They are often prepared by reaction of the acid or the ester with halogen:

RCH_{2}CO_{2}R' + Cl_{2} → RCHClCO_{2}R' + HCl

A related method is the Hell-Volhard-Zelinsky halogenation.

Amino acids are susceptible to diazotization in the presence of chloride, a process that affords chiral 2-chloro carboxylic acids and esters.

== Reactions ==
Consistent with these compounds being alkylating agents, the α-halide is readily substituted, e.g. by azide. Similarly, the α-bromocarboxylic acid undergo nucleophilic substitution with ammonia to give the amino acid,

The Darzens reaction involves a ketone or aldehyde with an α-haloester in the presence of a base to form an α,β-epoxy ester, also called a "glycidic ester". The reaction process begins with deprotonation at the halogenated position. In a related reaction, α-halo carboxylic esters can be reduced by lithium aluminium hydride to the α-halo alcohols, which can be converted to the α-epoxides.

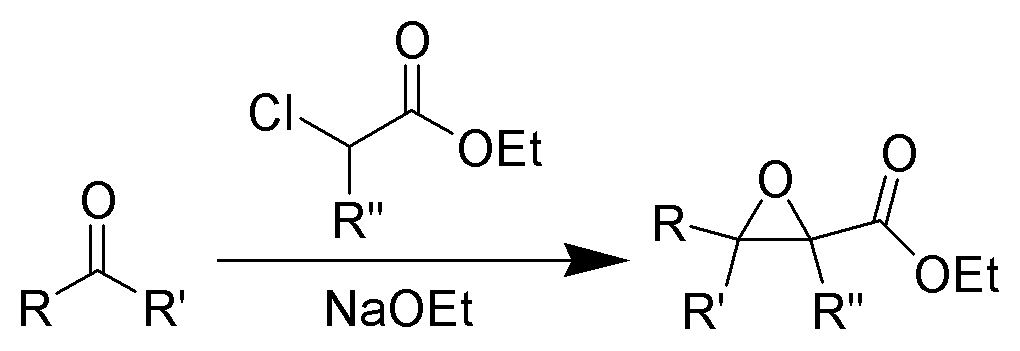

α-Halo-esters can be converted to vinyl halides. upon reaction with ketones and chromous chloride.

== Applications ==
A prominent α-halo carboxylic acid is chloroacetic acid, which is used to produce carboxymethyl cellulose, carboxymethyl starch, as well as several phenoxy herbicides. 2,2-Dichloropropionic acid ("Dalapon") is an herbicide.
