= C2H2Cl2O2 =

The molecular formula C_{2}H_{2}Cl_{2}O_{2} (molar mass: 128.94 g/mol, exact mass: 127.9432 u) may refer to:

- Chloromethyl chloroformate
- Dichloroacetic acid
