= C3H4Cl2O2 =

The molecular formula C_{3}H_{4}Cl_{2}O_{2} (molar mass: 142.97 g/mol, exact mass: 141.9588 u) may refer to:

- 1-Chloroethyl chloroformate
- 2-Chloroethyl chloroformate
- 2,2-Dichloropropionic acid (Dalapon)
