= 1-Chloroethyl chloroformate =

Names
- Preferred IUPAC name 1-Chloroethyl carbonochloridate
- Other names α-chloroethyl chloroformate

Identifiers
| CAS Number | 50893-53-3 |
| 3D model (JSmol) | Interactive image |
| ChemSpider | 454726 |
| ECHA InfoCard | 100.051.650 |
| EC Number | 256-834-2 |
| PubChem CID | 521305 |
| UNII | 2L3UG3R4FD |
| CompTox Dashboard (EPA) | DTXSID70965132 |
- InChI: InChI=1S/C3H4Cl2O2/c1-2(4)7-3(5)6/h2H,1H3 Key: QOPVNWQGBQYBBP-UHFFFAOYSA-N
- SMILES: ClC(OC(Cl)C)=O

Properties
| Chemical formula | C_{3}H_{4}Cl_{2}O_{2} |
| Molar mass | 142.96 g·mol^{−1} |

Hazards
- Safety data sheet (SDS)

Related compounds
| Related chloroformates | 2-Chloroethyl chloroformate; Chloromethyl chloroformate; Ethyl chloroformate |
- Except where otherwise noted, data are given for materials in their standard state (at 25 °C [77 °F], 100 kPa). Infobox references

1-Chloroethyl chloroformate (chemical formula: C_{3}H_{4}Cl_{2}O_{2}) has a structure consisting of ethyl chloroformate with a chloro group as substituent on the ethyl group and has two enantiomeric forms. It can be used for N-dealkylation of tertiary amines.

== Synthesis ==
1-Chloroethyl chloroformate can be manufactured by the reaction of acetaldehyde with phosgene in the presence of benzyltributylammonium chloride. or various other catatysts.

== Uses ==
1-Chloroethyl chloroformate is a useful reagent, for example for the N-dealkylation of tertiary amines, especially their demethylation to produce drug metabolites for forensic investigations.
