= C2HCl3O =

The molecular formula C_{2}HCl_{3}O (molar mass: 147.39 g/mol, exact mass: 145.9093 u) may refer to:

- Chloral, also known as trichloroacetaldehyde or trichloroethanal
- Dichloroacetyl chloride
