= Chloroformic acid =

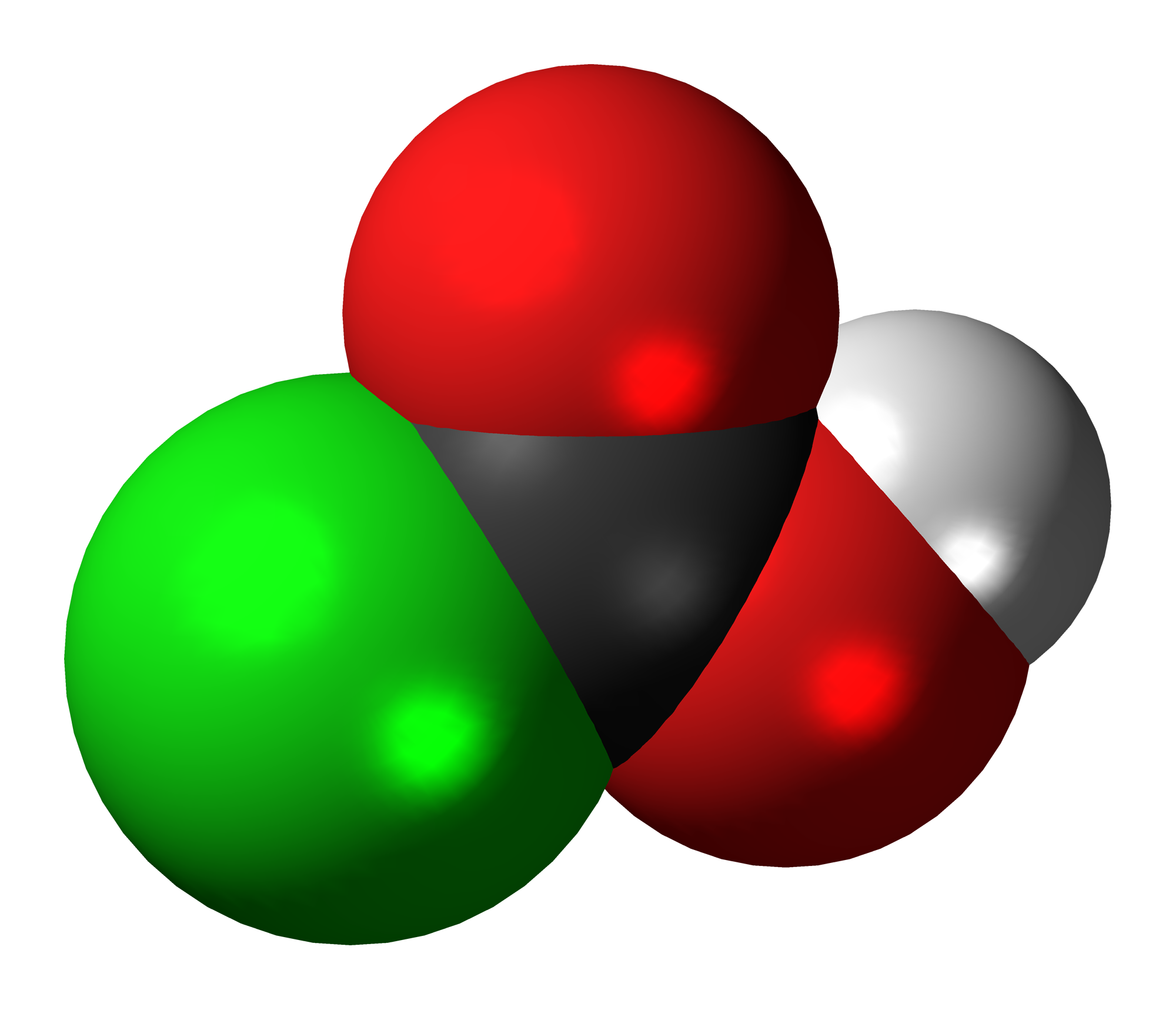

Names
- Preferred IUPAC name Carbonochloridic acid
- Other names Chloroformic acid Chlorocarbonic acid

Identifiers
CAS Number	463-73-0
3D model (JSmol)	Interactive image
ChemSpider	144299
PubChem CID	164602
CompTox Dashboard (EPA)	DTXSID10196802
- InChI: InChI=1S/CHClO2/c2-1(3)4/h(H,3,4) Key: AOGYCOYQMAVAFD-UHFFFAOYSA-N; InChI=1/CHClO2/c2-1(3)4/h(H,3,4) Key: AOGYCOYQMAVAFD-UHFFFAOYAQ
- SMILES: ClC(=O)O

Properties
Chemical formula	ClCO_{2}H
Molar mass	80.47 g·mol^{−1}
Acidity (pK_{a})	0.27
- Except where otherwise noted, data are given for materials in their standard state (at 25 °C [77 °F], 100 kPa). verify (what is ?) Infobox references

Chloroformic acid is a chemical compound with the formula ClCO_{2}H. It is the single acyl-halide derivative of carbonic acid (phosgene is the double acyl-halide derivative). Chloroformic acid is also structurally related to formic acid, in a way that the non-acidic hydrogen of formic acid is replaced by chlorine. Despite the similar name, it is very different from chloroform. It is described as unstable, decomposing into carbon dioxide and hydrogen chloride.

Chloroformic acid itself is too unstable to be handled for chemical reactions. However, many esters of this carboxylic acid are stable and these chloroformates are important reagents in organic chemistry. They are used to prepare mixed carboxylic acid anhydrides used in peptide synthesis.

== See also ==
- Chloroacetic acids
- Dichloroacetic acid
- Trichloroacetic acid
