= Dichlormid =

Names
- Other names N,N-diallyl-2,2-dichloroacetamide

Identifiers
CAS Number	37764-25-3
3D model (JSmol)	Interactive image
ChEBI	CHEBI:81956
ChEMBL	ChEMBL2251310
ChemSpider	34686
ECHA InfoCard	100.048.763
EC Number	253-658-8
KEGG	C18782
PubChem CID	37829
UNII	E901J4382O
CompTox Dashboard (EPA)	DTXSID4027997
- InChI: InChI=1S/C8H11Cl2NO/c1-3-5-11(6-4-2)8(12)7(9)10/h3-4,7H,1-2,5-6H2 Key: YRMLFORXOOIJDR-UHFFFAOYSA-N
- SMILES: O=C(N(CC=C)CC=C)C(Cl)Cl

Properties
Chemical formula	C_{8}H_{11}Cl_{2}NO
Molar mass	208.08 g·mol^{−1}
Appearance	colorless oil
Melting point	5.5 °C (41.9 °F; 278.6 K)

Hazards
- GHS labelling
Pictograms	(GHS07: Exclamation mark)
Signal word	Warning
Hazard statements	H302, H315, H332
Precautionary statements	P261, P264, P270, P271, P280, P301+P317, P302+P352, P304+P340, P317, P321, P330, P332+P317, P362+P364, P501
- Except where otherwise noted, data are given for materials in their standard state (at 25 °C [77 °F], 100 kPa). Infobox references

Dichlormid is an organic compound with the formula Cl_{2}CHCON(CH_{2}C=CH_{2})_{2}. The compound can be classified as the amide of diallylamine and dichloroacetic acid. It is an herbicide safener for use with maize.

It can be synthesized by reacting diallylamine with dichloroacetyl chloride.
