= C3H3NO2 =

The molecular formula C_{3}H_{3}NO_{2} may refer to:

- Cyanoacetic acid, an organic compound; a white, hygroscopic solid
- Methyl cyanoformate, an organic compound
- Münchnone, a mesoionic compound
- Oxazolone, a chemical compound and functional group
