= Jacqueline Whalley =

New Zealand computer scientist

Academic background
- Education: University of Kent, Australian National University
- Thesis: Synthetic studies towards the total synthesis of sordaricin (1995)
- Doctoral advisor: Lew Mander

Jacqueline Louise Whalley is a New Zealand academic, and is a full professor at the Auckland University of Technology, specialising in software engineering and computer science education.

== Academic career ==
Whalley trained as a chemist before concentrating on computer science and software engineering. She completed a Bachelor of Science at Massey University and a PhD titled Synthetic studies towards the total synthesis of sordaricin at the Australian National University in 1995. Her doctoral studies were supervised by Lew Mander, and involved making computer predictions of the outcome of Diels–Alder chemical reactions, after which she would test the predictions in the laboratory. Whalley undertook postdoctoral research at the University of St Andrews and Imperial College, working on positron emission tomography in medicinal chemistry for hormone-dependent cancers and neurological disease. Whalley completed a Master of Science with Distinction at the University of Kent in 2001, creating a molecular-level computer model of Creutzfeldt-Jakob disease for use in biomedical research. She joined the computing lab at the University of Kent, where she was the lead researcher on a European Union CRAFT Framework 6 grant developing a fisheries management system.

Whalley moved to Auckland University of Technology in 2004. From 2015 to 2015 she was the director of the Geoinformatics Research Centre, and from 2021 is co-director of the Software Engineering Research Lab. Whalley was promoted to full professor in 2023.

One of Whalley's research interests is the teaching of computer programming and software engineering. She has investigated how students learn to debug, and uses social science and psychology to study learning processes. Her research on assessment and learning taxonomies has affected how computer programming is taught to beginners in Australia and New Zealand.

== Selected works ==
- Mike Lopez; Whalley, Jacqueline; Phil Robbins; Raymond Lister (6 September 2008), Relationships between reading, tracing and writing skills in introductory programming, Association for Computing Machinery, doi:10.1145/1404520.1404531, Wikidata Q124078353
- Stephen Brooks; Whalley, Jacqueline (2008). "Multilayer hybrid visualizations to support 3D GIS". Computers, Environment and Urban Systems. 32 (4): 278–292. doi:10.1016/j.compenvurbsys.2007.11.001. Wikidata Q124078352.
- Parks, Donovan; Michael Porter; Sylvia Churcher; Suwen Wang; Blouin, Christian; Whalley, Jacqueline; Brooks, Stephen; Robert G Beiko (2009). "GenGIS: A geospatial information system for genomic data". Genome Research. 19 (10): 1896–1904. doi:10.1101/gr.095612.109. PMC 2765287. PMID 19635847. Wikidata Q33487595.
- Judy Sheard; Angela Carbone; Raymond Lister; Beth Simon; Errol Thompson; Whalley, Jacqueline (2008). "Going SOLO to assess novice programmers". SIGCSE bulletin. 40 (3): 209–213. doi:10.1145/1597849.1384328. Wikidata Q114071380.
- Raymond Lister; Anders Berglund; Tony Clear; et al. (2006). "Research perspectives on the objects-early debate". SIGCSE bulletin. 38 (4): 146–165. doi:10.1145/1189136.1189183. Wikidata Q124078354.
- Stephen Brooks; Whalley, Jacqueline (2008). "Multilayer hybrid visualizations to support 3D GIS". Computers, Environment and Urban Systems. 32 (4): 278–292. doi:10.1016/j.compenvurbsys.2007.11.001. Wikidata Q124078352.
