= Congenital lactic acidosis =

- Other names: CLA
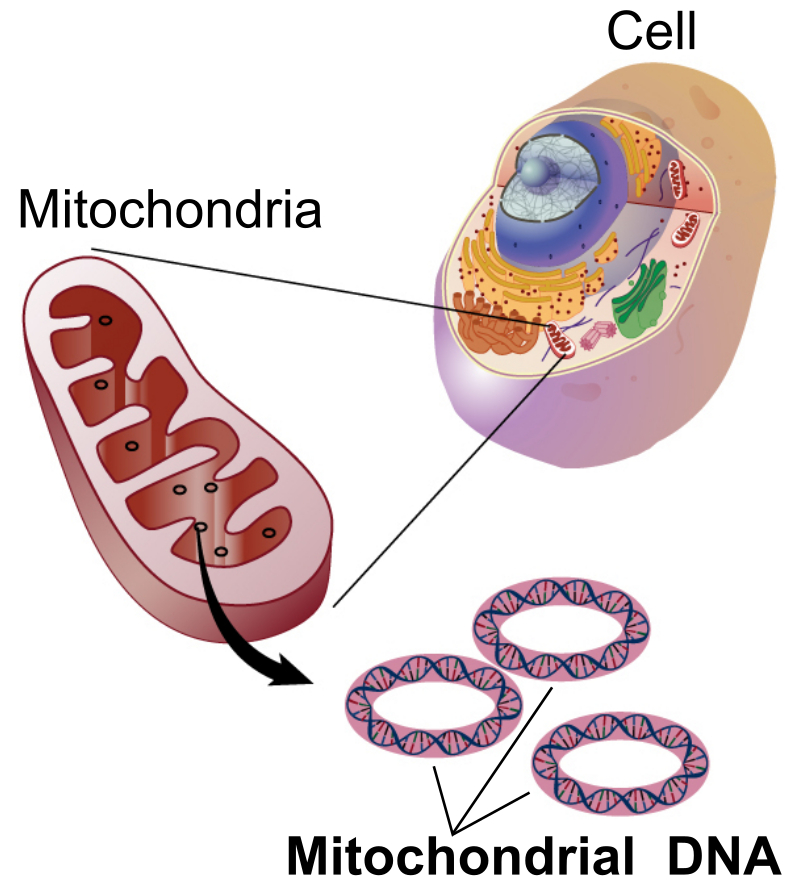
- Mitochondrial DNA mutations cause this condition

Congenital lactic acidosis is a rare disease caused by mutations in mitochondrial DNA (mtDNA) that affect the ability of cells to use energy and cause too much lactic acid to build up in the body, a condition called lactic acidosis.

== Signs and symptoms ==
Severe cases of CLA manifest in the neonatal period; milder cases caused by mtDNA mutations may not manifest until as late as early adulthood. Symptoms may be constant or brought on by an event causing stress, such as an asthma attack, seizure, or infection. Symptoms in the neonatal period include hypotonia, lethargy, vomiting, and tachypnea. As the disease progresses, it causes developmental delay, cognitive disabilities, abnormal development of the face and head, and organ failure.

== Pathogenesis ==
Though lactic acidosis can be a complication of other congenital diseases, when it occurs in isolation it is typically caused by a mutation in the pyruvate dehydrogenase complex genes. It has either an autosomal recessive or X-linked mode of inheritance. Congenital lactic acidosis can be caused by mutations on the X chromosome or in mitochondrial DNA.

== Diagnosis ==
Congenital lactic acidosis can be suspected based on blood or cerebrospinal fluid tests showing high levels of lactate; the underlying genetic mutation can only be diagnosed with genetic testing.

== Treatment ==
There is no proven treatment for congenital lactic acidosis. Treatments that are occasionally used or that are under investigation include the ketogenic diet and dichloroacetate. Other treatments aim to relieve symptoms – for example, anticonvulsants may be used to relieve seizures.
