= Chloroacetic acids =

Family of carboxylic acids

In organic chemistry, the chloroacetic acids (systematic name chloroethanoic acids) are three related chlorocarbon carboxylic acids (and thus haloacetic acids):

- Chloroacetic acid, CH_{2}ClCO_{2}H
- Dichloroacetic acid, CHCl_{2}CO_{2}H
- Trichloroacetic acid, CCl_{3}CO_{2}H

== Properties ==
As the number of chlorine atoms increases, the electronegativity of that end of the molecule increases, and the molecule adopts a progressively more ionic character: its density, boiling point and acidity all increase.

Acid	Melting point (°C)	Boiling point (°C)	Density (g/cm^{3})	pK_{a}
Acetic acid	16.5	118.1	1.05	4.76
Chloroacetic acid	61–63	189	1.58	2.87
Dichloroacetic acid	9.5	194	1.57	1.25
Trichloroacetic acid	57	196	1.63	0.77

== Production ==
Many routes have been devised to these compounds. Common approaches include hydrolysis of polychloroethanes or polychloroethylenes and chlorination of acetic acid or its anhydride. For example, chloroacetic acid can be made by hydrolysis of trichloroethylene in the presence of sulfuric acid:

CCl_{2}=CHCl + 2 H_{2}O → CH_{2}ClCO_{2}H + 2 HCl

Dichloroacetic acid is manufactured by hydrolysis of dichloroacetyl chloride:

CHCl_{2}COCl + H_{2}O → CHCl_{2}CO_{_{2}}H + HCl

Trichloroacetic acid is made by chlorination of acetic acid using a suitable catalyst:

CH_{3}CO_{2}H + 3 Cl_{2} → CCl_{3}CO_{2}H + 3 HCl

== Uses ==
The chloroacetic acids are valuable building blocks in organic synthesis, often for pharmaceuticals and insecticides. For example dichloroacetic acid serves as a masked version of glycolic acid. In addition to being a precursor to herbicides, trichloroacetic acid is used in biochemistry to precipitate proteins.

== Safety ==
For organic acids, these chloroacetic acids are relatively strong. They are, however, far less acidic than traditional mineral acids such as hydrochloric acid. They are skin irritants but are not particularly toxic: the LD_{50} is 0.5 g/kg for trichloroacetate (rat, oral).
