= 2-Chloropropionic acid =

- 2-Chloropropionic acid

Names
- Preferred IUPAC name 2-Chloropropanoic acid
- Other names α-Chloropropanoic acid α-Chloropropionic acid

Identifiers
CAS Number	598-78-7 (racemate); 29617-66-1 (S); 7474-05-7 (R)
3D model (JSmol)	Interactive image
ChEMBL	ChEMBL1743205
ChemSpider	11241
ECHA InfoCard	100.009.049
EC Number	209-952-3
PubChem CID	11734
RTECS number	UE8575000
UNII	ADV1WUE1NB
UN number	2511
CompTox Dashboard (EPA)	DTXSID0021545
- InChI: InChI=1S/C3H5ClO2/c1-2(4)3(5)6/h2H,1H3,(H,5,6) Key: GAWAYYRQGQZKCR-UHFFFAOYSA-N; InChI=1/C3H5ClO2/c1-2(4)3(5)6/h2H,1H3,(H,5,6) Key: GAWAYYRQGQZKCR-UHFFFAOYAW
- SMILES: ClC(C(=O)O)C

Properties
Chemical formula	C_{3}H_{5}ClO_{2}
Molar mass	108.52 g·mol^{−1}
Appearance	Colorless liquid
Density	1.18 g/mL
Melting point	−13 °C (9 °F; 260 K)
Boiling point	78 °C (172 °F; 351 K) at 10 mmHg
Solubility in water	Miscible

Hazards
- Occupational safety and health (OHS/OSH)
Main hazards	Toxic, corrosive
- GHS labelling
Pictograms	(GHS05: Corrosive) (GHS06: Toxic) (GHS07: Exclamation mark) (GHS08: Health hazard)
Signal word	Danger
Hazard statements	H301, H302, H310, H314, H331, H371, H373
Precautionary statements	P260, P262, P264, P270, P271, P280, P301+P312, P301+P330+P331, P302+P350, P303+P361+P353, P304+P340, P305+P351+P338, P309+P311, P310, P311, P314, P321, P322, P330, P361, P363, P403+P233, P405, P501
Flash point	101 °C (214 °F; 374 K)
Safety data sheet (SDS)	External MSDS

Related compounds
Related compounds	Propionic acid Chloroacetic acid
- Except where otherwise noted, data are given for materials in their standard state (at 25 °C [77 °F], 100 kPa). verify (what is ?) Infobox references

2-Chloropropionic acid (2-chloropropanoic acid) is the chemical compound with the formula CH_{3}CHClCO_{2}H. This colorless liquid is the simplest chiral chlorocarboxylic acid, and it is noteworthy for being readily available as a single enantiomer. The conjugate base of 2-chloropropionic acid (CH_{3}CHClCO_{2}^{−}), as well as its salts and esters, are known as 2-chloropropionates or 2-chloropropanoates.

== Preparation ==
Racemic 2-chloropropionic acid is produced by chlorination of propionyl chloride followed by hydrolysis of the 2-chloropropionyl chloride. Enantiomerically pure (S)-2-chloropropionic acid can be prepared from L-alanine via diazotization in hydrochloric acid. Other α-amino acids undergo this reaction.

== Reactions ==
Reduction of (S)-2-chloropropionic acid with lithium aluminium hydride affords (S)-2-chloropropanol, the simplest chiral chloro-alcohol. This alcohol undergoes cyclization upon treatment with potassium hydroxide, which causes dehydrohalogenation to give the epoxide, (R)-propylene oxide (methyloxirane).

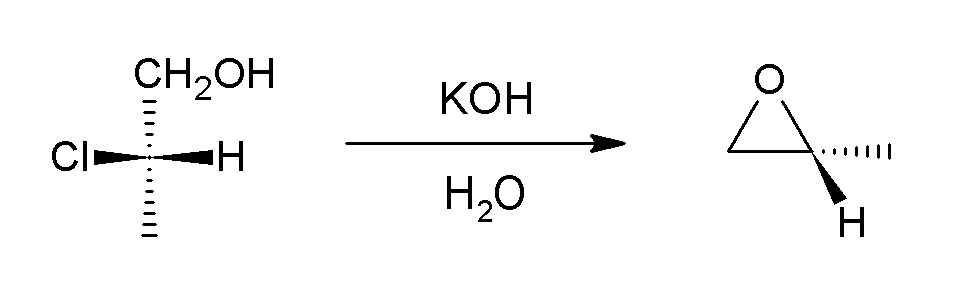

2-Chloropropionyl chloride reacts with isobutylbenzene to give, after hydrolysis, ibuprofen.

== Applications ==
Some of the known uses include in the synthesis of: Dichlorprop, Flamprop, Haloxyfop

== Safety ==
In general, α-halocarboxylic acids and their esters are good alkylating agents and should be handled with care. 2-Chloropropionic acid is a neurotoxin.

== See also ==
- 2,2-Dichloropropionic acid
