= Dalapon-sodium =

Names
- IUPAC name sodium 2,2-dichloropropionate
- Other names: dalapon; proprop; DPA; sodium 2,2-dichloropropanoate

Identifiers
CAS Number	127-20-8
3D model (JSmol)	Interactive image
ChEMBL	ChEMBL3188445
ChemSpider	29108
ECHA InfoCard	100.004.390
EC Number	204-828-5
PubChem CID	517058
UNII	ZAQ365WW9E
CompTox Dashboard (EPA)	DTXSID5024001
- InChI: InChI=1S/C3H4Cl2O2.Na/c1-3(4,5)2(6)7;/h1H3,(H,6,7);/q;+1/p-1 Key: PDEFQWNXOUGDJR-UHFFFAOYSA-M
- SMILES: CC(C(=O)[O-])(Cl)Cl.[Na+]

Properties
Chemical formula	C_{3}H_{3}Cl_{2}NaO_{2}
Molar mass	164.94 g·mol^{−1}
Appearance	Pale-coloured powder
Density	1740 kg/cu.m
Melting point	191 °C (376 °F; 464 K) (decomposes)
Solubility in water	629 g/L, 500,000 ppm
Solubility in methanol	369 g/L
Solubility in ethanol	110 g/L
Solubility in acetone	3.25 g/L
Solubility in benzene	0.02 g/L
Vapor pressure	<1 mPa

Hazards
- GHS labelling
Pictograms	(GHS05: Corrosive)
Signal word	Danger
Hazard statements	H315, H318, H412
Precautionary statements	P264, P264+P265, P273, P280, P302+P352, P305+P354+P338, P317, P321, P332+P317, P362+P364, P501

Related compounds
Related compounds	Dalapon; Dalapon-magnesium; Dalapon-calcium
- Except where otherwise noted, data are given for materials in their standard state (at 25 °C [77 °F], 100 kPa). Infobox references

Dalapon-sodium is the sodium salt of dalapon, a selective herbicide, used in Australia. Sometimes it is also simply called "dalapon" or "dalapon (present as the sodium salt)", see dalapon for information on dalapon generally.

Dalapon-sodium is an organochloride, the conjugate base of 2,2-dichloropropanoic acid, and usually supplied as a water-soluble powder. Concentrated solutions hydrolyze over time.

Dalapon-sodium's mode of action is unknown, which puts it in Group Z / Group 0 under the HRAC classification.

In soil, it has a half life tested at 30 days.
