= Fluorenylmethyloxycarbonyl chloride =

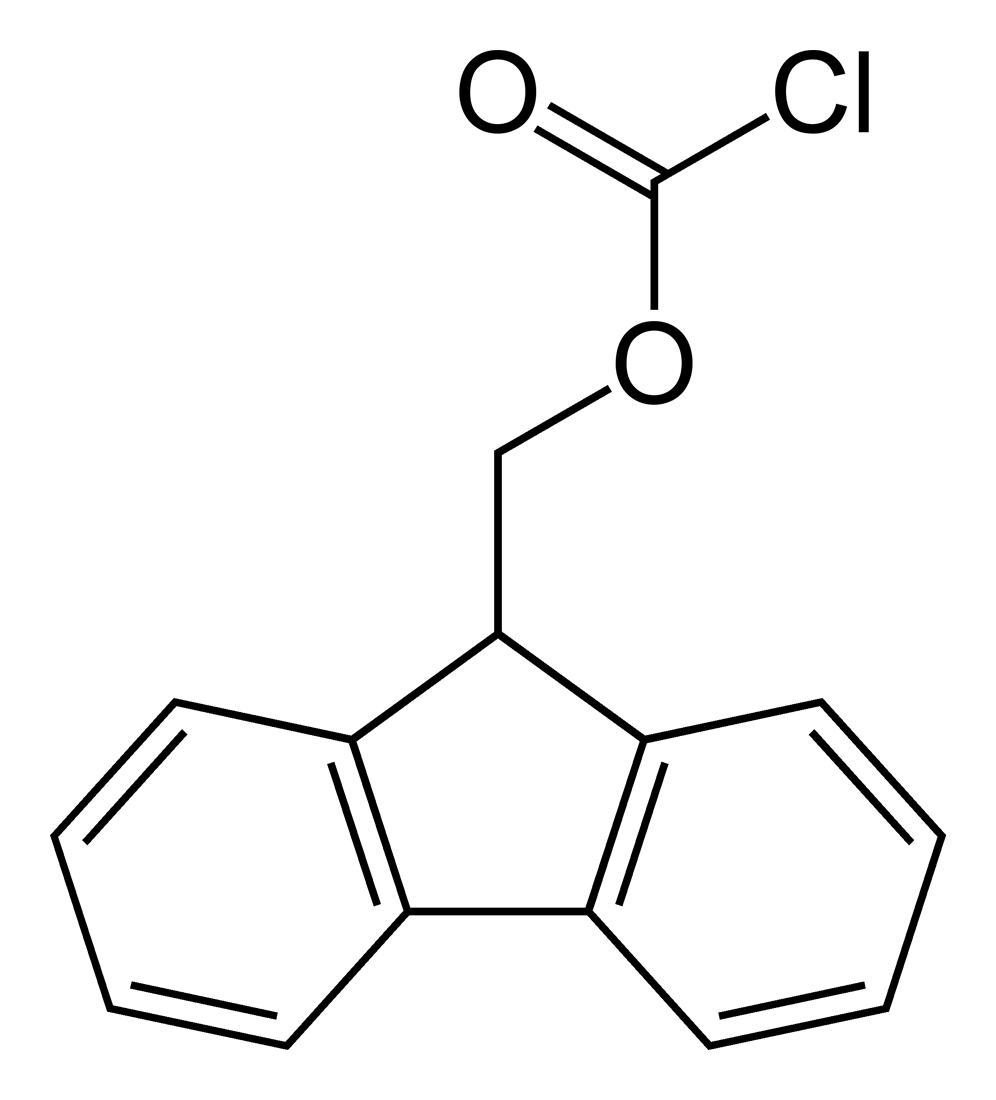

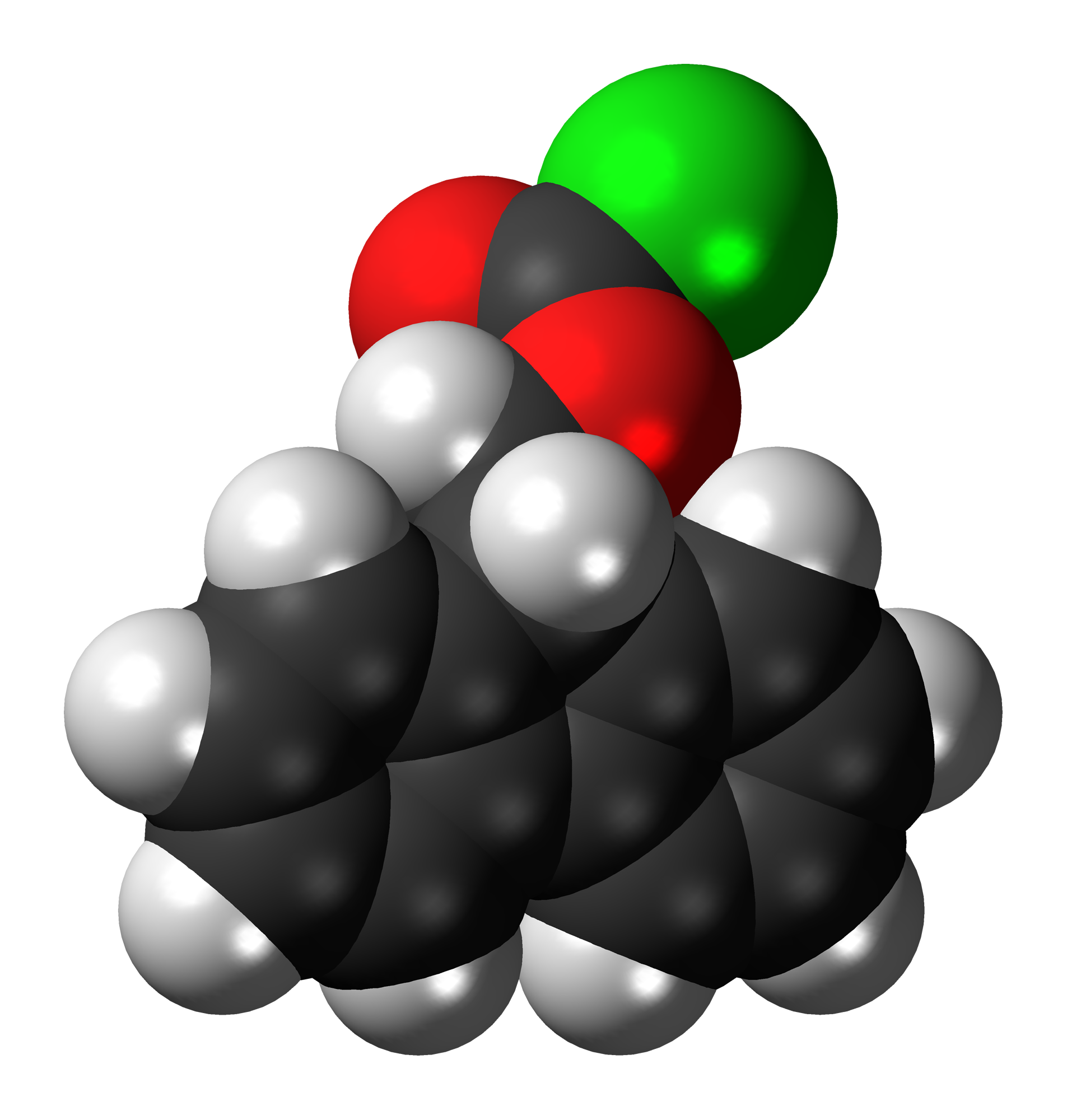

Names
- Preferred IUPAC name (9H-Fluoren-9-yl)methyl carbonochloridate
- Other names 9-Fluorenylmethyl chloroformate; 9-Fluorenylmethoxycarbonyl chloride; Fmoc-chloride

Identifiers
CAS Number	28920-43-6
3D model (JSmol)	Interactive image
ChemSpider	31647
ECHA InfoCard	100.044.816
EC Number	249-313-6
PubChem CID	34367
UNII	9PLB0BTT90
CompTox Dashboard (EPA)	DTXSID10183116
- InChI: InChI=1S/C15H11ClO2/c16-15(17)18-9-14-12-7-3-1-5-10(12)11-6-2-4-8-13(11)14/h1-8,14H,9H2 Key: IRXSLJNXXZKURP-UHFFFAOYSA-N; InChI=1/C15H11ClO2/c16-15(17)18-9-14-12-7-3-1-5-10(12)11-6-2-4-8-13(11)14/h1-8,14H,9H2 Key: IRXSLJNXXZKURP-UHFFFAOYAT
- SMILES: ClC(=O)OCC3c1ccccc1c2c3cccc2

Properties
Chemical formula	C_{15}H_{11}ClO_{2}
Molar mass	258.70 g·mol^{−1}
Melting point	62 to 64 °C (144 to 147 °F; 335 to 337 K)

Hazards
- GHS labelling
Pictograms	(GHS05: Corrosive)
Signal word	Danger
Hazard statements	H314
Precautionary statements	P260, P264, P270, P271, P280, P301+P312, P301+P330+P331, P303+P361+P353, P304+P312, P304+P340, P305+P351+P338, P310, P312, P321, P330, P363, P405, P501
- Except where otherwise noted, data are given for materials in their standard state (at 25 °C [77 °F], 100 kPa). verify (what is ?) Infobox references

Fluorenylmethyloxycarbonyl chloride (Fmoc-Cl) is a chloroformate ester. It is used to introduce the fluorenylmethyloxycarbonyl protecting group as the Fmoc carbamate.

== Preparation ==
This compound may be prepared by reacting 9-fluorenylmethanol with phosgene:

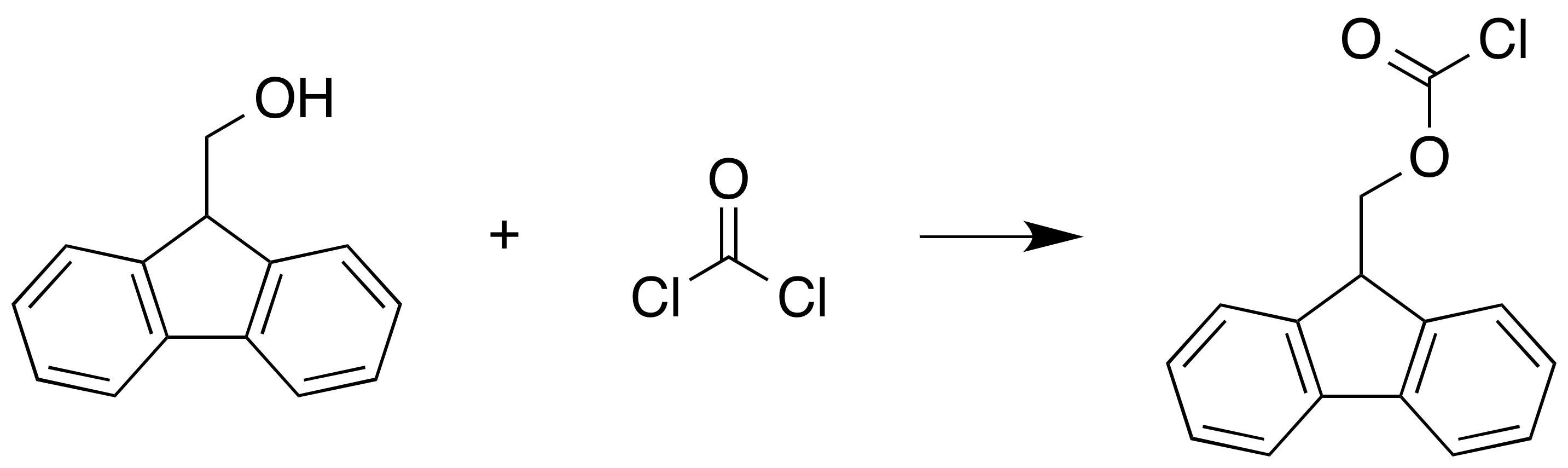
