= Dalapon-magnesium =

Weed control herbicide

Names
- IUPAC name Magnesium bis(2,2-dichloropropanoate)

Identifiers
CAS Number	29110-22-3
3D model (JSmol)	Interactive image
ChemSpider	56575
PubChem CID	62841
UNII	QVP8H4F5E1
CompTox Dashboard (EPA)	DTXSID80890820
- InChI: InChI=1S/2C3H4Cl2O2.Mg/c2*1-3(4,5)2(6)7;/h2*1H3,(H,6,7);/q;;+2/p-2 Key: QPPXJFBMSFYKMM-UHFFFAOYSA-L
- SMILES: CC(C(=O)[O-])(Cl)Cl.CC(C(=O)[O-])(Cl)Cl.[Mg+2]

Properties
Chemical formula	C_{6}H_{6}Cl_{4}MgO_{4}
Molar mass	308.21 g·mol^{−1}

Related compounds
Related compounds	dalapon; dalapon-sodium; dalapon-calcium
- Except where otherwise noted, data are given for materials in their standard state (at 25 °C [77 °F], 100 kPa). Infobox references

Dalapon-magnesium is the magnesium salt of dalapon, a selective herbicide. It is an organochloride, the conjugate base of 2,2-dichloropropanoic acid, and usually supplied as a water-soluble powder. Dalapon-magnesium is a salt variation of dalapon, see there for the main article.

Dalapon-magnesium's mode of action (unknown) puts it in Group Z / Group 0 under the HRAC classification.
