= Triallylamine =

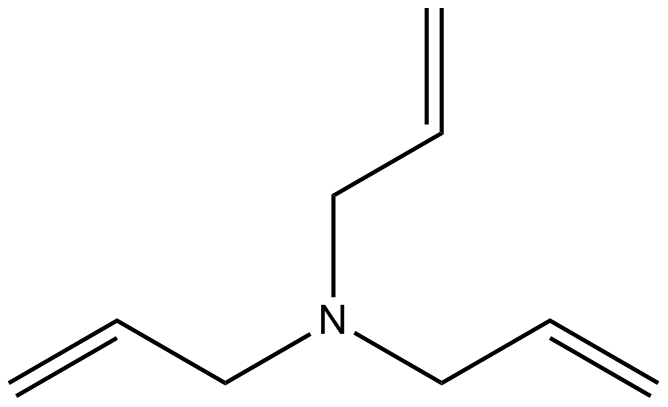

Names
- IUPAC name N,N-bis(prop-2-enyl)prop-2-en-1-amine

Identifiers
CAS Number	102-70-5
3D model (JSmol)	Interactive image
ChEMBL	ChEMBL3188834
ChemSpider	7335
ECHA InfoCard	100.002.772
EC Number	203-048-2
PubChem CID	7617
RTECS number	XX5950000
UNII	B6N19XC04R
UN number	2610
CompTox Dashboard (EPA)	DTXSID5026174
- InChI: InChI=1S/C9H15N/c1-4-7-10(8-5-2)9-6-3/h4-6H,1-3,7-9H2 Key: VPYJNCGUESNPMV-UHFFFAOYSA-N
- SMILES: C=CCN(CC=C)CC=C

Properties
Chemical formula	C_{9}H_{15}N
Molar mass	137.226 g·mol^{−1}
Appearance	colorless liquid
Density	0.809 g/cm^{3}
Boiling point	155.5 °C (311.9 °F; 428.6 K)

Hazards
- GHS labelling
Pictograms	(GHS02: Flammable) (GHS05: Corrosive) (GHS06: Toxic) (GHS07: Exclamation mark)
Signal word	Danger
Hazard statements	H226, H302, H311, H312, H314, H331, H332, H412
Precautionary statements	P210, P233, P240, P241, P242, P243, P260, P264, P270, P271, P273, P280, P301+P317, P301+P330+P331, P302+P352, P302+P361+P354, P303+P361+P353, P304+P340, P305+P354+P338, P316, P317, P321, P330, P361+P364, P362+P364, P363, P370+P378, P403+P233, P403+P235, P405, P501
- Except where otherwise noted, data are given for materials in their standard state (at 25 °C [77 °F], 100 kPa). Infobox references

Triallylamine is the organic compound with the formula N(CH_{2}CH=CH_{2})_{3}. It is a colorless liquid with an ammonia-like odor. It is multifunctional, featuring a tertiary amine and three alkene groups. Triallylamine (and mono- and diallyl amines) is produced by the treating allyl chloride with ammonia.

Allylamines have particularly weak α-CH bonds, being near 80 kcal/mol.

== Related compounds ==
- Allylamine
- Diallylamine
