= Diallylamine =

Names
- IUPAC name N-prop-2-enylprop-2-en-1-amine

Identifiers
CAS Number	124-02-7
3D model (JSmol)	Interactive image
ChEMBL	ChEMBL3186706
ChemSpider	21106561
ECHA InfoCard	100.004.248
EC Number	204-671-2
PubChem CID	31279
RTECS number	UC6650000
UNII	N18EXB6V6P
UN number	2359
CompTox Dashboard (EPA)	DTXSID1024918
- InChI: InChI=1S/C6H11N/c1-3-5-7-6-4-2/h3-4,7H,1-2,5-6H2 Key: DYUWTXWIYMHBQS-UHFFFAOYSA-N
- SMILES: C=CCNCC=C

Properties
Chemical formula	C_{6}H_{11}N
Molar mass	97.161 g·mol^{−1}
Appearance	colorless liquid
Density	0.7874 g/cm^{3}
Melting point	−88 °C (−126 °F; 185 K)
Boiling point	111 °C (232 °F; 384 K)

Hazards
- GHS labelling
Pictograms	(GHS02: Flammable) (GHS05: Corrosive) (GHS06: Toxic) (GHS07: Exclamation mark)
Signal word	Danger
Hazard statements	H225, H302, H311, H314, H315, H319, H335, H412
Precautionary statements	P210, P233, P240, P241, P242, P243, P260, P264, P264+P265, P270, P271, P273, P280, P301+P317, P301+P330+P331, P302+P352, P302+P361+P354, P303+P361+P353, P304+P340, P305+P351+P338, P305+P354+P338, P316, P317, P319, P321, P330, P332+P317, P337+P317, P361+P364, P362+P364, P363, P370+P378, P403+P233, P403+P235, P405, P501
- Except where otherwise noted, data are given for materials in their standard state (at 25 °C [77 °F], 100 kPa). Infobox references

Diallylamine is the organic compound with the formula HN(CH_{2}CH=CH_{2})_{2}. It is a colorless liquid with an ammonia-like odor. It is multifunctional, featuring a secondary amine and two alkene groups. Diallylamine is used in the production of N,N-diallyldichloroacetamide (dichlormid) and N,N-diallyldimethylammonium chloride.

== Preparation ==
It is produced commercially by partial hydrogenation of acrylonitrile:

2 NCCH=CH_{2} + 4 H_{2} → HN(CH_{2}CH=CH_{2})_{2} + NH_{3}

A laboratory route to diallylamine entails diallylation of calcium cyanamide followed by decyanation of the product.

== Related compounds ==
- Allylamine
- Triallylamine
