= Methyl cyanoformate =

Names
- Preferred IUPAC name Methyl carbonocyanidate

Identifiers
| CAS Number | 17640-15-2 |
| 3D model (JSmol) | Interactive image |
| ChemSpider | 26657 |
| ECHA InfoCard | 100.037.826 |
| PubChem CID | 28660 |
| UNII | 7S9M7F9JLT |
| CompTox Dashboard (EPA) | DTXSID1066235 |
- InChI: InChI=1S/C3H3NO2/c1-6-3(5)2-4/h1H3 Key: OBWFJXLKRAFEDI-UHFFFAOYSA-N; InChI=1/C3H3NO2/c1-6-3(5)2-4/h1H3 Key: OBWFJXLKRAFEDI-UHFFFAOYAH
- SMILES: N#CC(=O)OC

Properties
| Chemical formula | C_{3}H_{3}NO_{2} |
| Molar mass | 85.06 |
| Appearance | colorless liquid |
| Density | 1.072 g/cm^{3} |
| Boiling point | 100 to 101 °C (212 to 214 °F; 373 to 374 K) |

Hazards
- Occupational safety and health (OHS/OSH)
| Main hazards | toxic |
- Except where otherwise noted, data are given for materials in their standard state (at 25 °C [77 °F], 100 kPa). verify (what is ?) Infobox references

Methyl cyanoformate is the organic compound with the formula CH_{3}OC(O)CN. It is used as a reagent in organic synthesis as a source of the methoxycarbonyl group, in which context it is also known as Mander's reagent. When a lithium enolate is generated in diethyl ether or methyl t-butyl ether, treatment with Mander's reagent will selectively afford the C-acylation product. Thus, for enolate acylation reactions in which C- vs. O-selectivity is a concern, methyl cyanoformate is often used in place of more common acylation reagent like methyl chloroformate.

Methyl cyanoformate is also an ingredient in Zyklon B. It has lachrymatory effects.
