= Chloromethyl chloroformate =

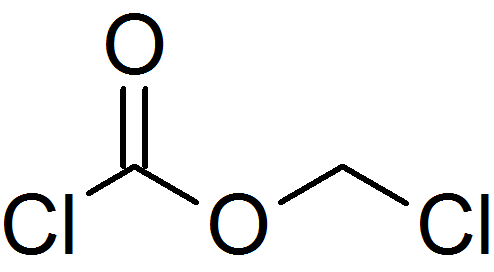

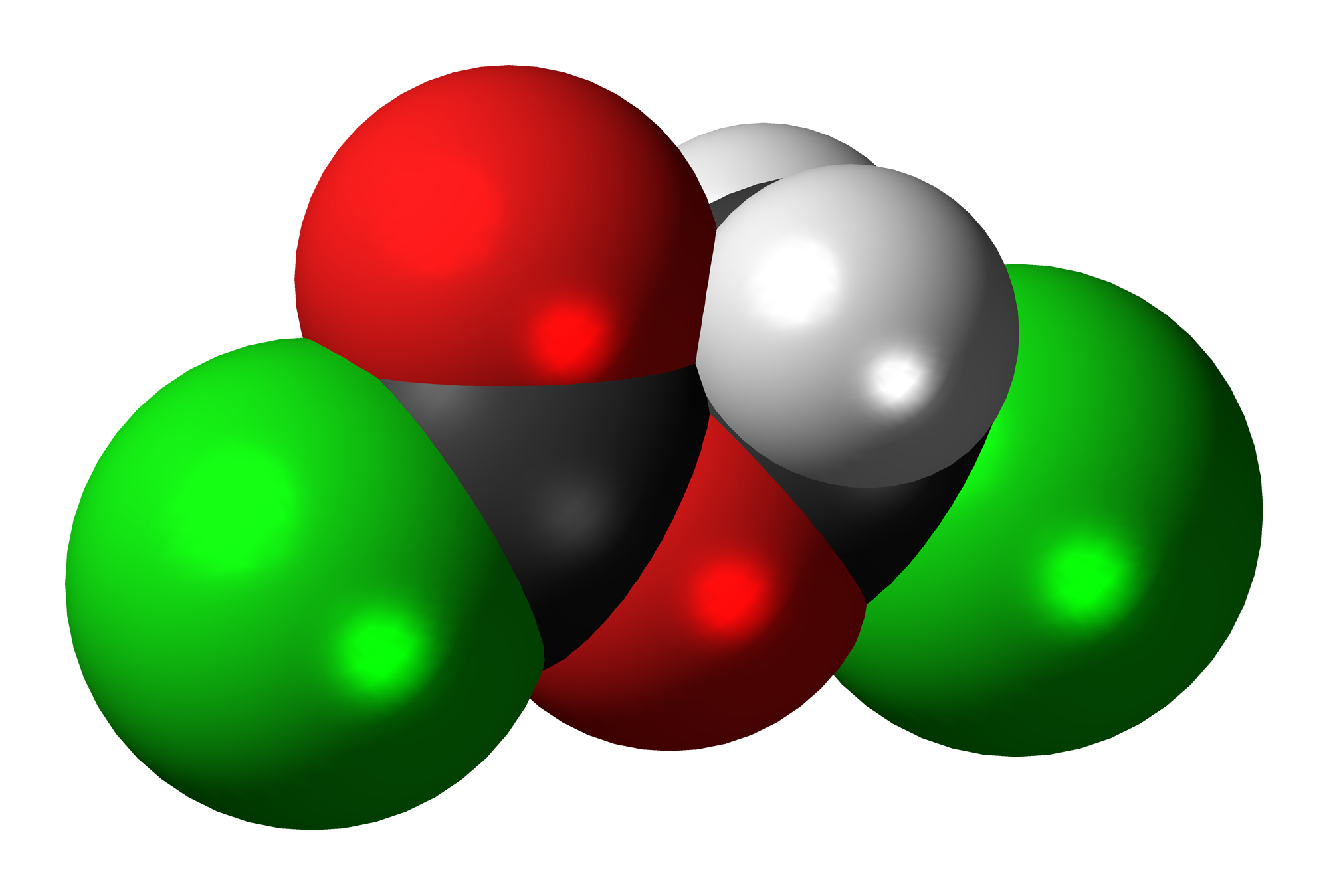

Names
- Preferred IUPAC name Chloromethyl carbonochloridate

Identifiers
CAS Number	22128-62-7
3D model (JSmol)	Interactive image; Interactive image
ChemSpider	56498
ECHA InfoCard	100.040.707
PubChem CID	62754
CompTox Dashboard (EPA)	DTXSID9074567
- InChI: InChI=1S/C2H2Cl2O2/c3-1-6-2(4)5/h1H2 Key: JYWJULGYGOLCGW-UHFFFAOYSA-N; InChI=1/C2H2Cl2O2/c3-1-6-2(4)5/h1H2 Key: JYWJULGYGOLCGW-UHFFFAOYAF
- SMILES: ClC(OCCl)=O; ClC(=O)OCCl

Properties
Chemical formula	C_{2}H_{2}Cl_{2}O_{2}
Molar mass	128.94 g·mol^{−1}
Appearance	Colorless liquid
Density	1.45 g/ml
Boiling point	107–108 °C (225–226 °F; 380–381 K)

Related compounds
Related chloroformates	Chloroethyl chloroformate
- Except where otherwise noted, data are given for materials in their standard state (at 25 °C [77 °F], 100 kPa). verify (what is ?) Infobox references

Chloromethyl chloroformate (CClO_{2}CH_{2}Cl), also known as palite gas, is a chemical compound and used for chemical warfare during World War I. German forces used a mixture of chloromethyl chloroformate and dichloromethyl chloroformate called "K-Stoff", while French and other Allied forces used it under name "Palite". It is a tearing agent designed to cause temporary blindness. It is a colorless liquid with a penetrating, irritating odor.

Industrially, chloromethyl chloroformate is used to manufacture other chemicals.
