= Dichloroacetyl chloride =

Names
- Preferred IUPAC name Dichloroacetyl chloride

Identifiers
CAS Number	79-36-7
3D model (JSmol)	Interactive image
Beilstein Reference	1209426
ChEBI	CHEBI:34688
ChEMBL	ChEMBL449486
ChemSpider	21106100
ECHA InfoCard	100.001.091
EC Number	201-199-9
Gmelin Reference	430743
KEGG	C14867
PubChem CID	6593
RTECS number	AO6650000
UNII	52O60099FY
UN number	1765
CompTox Dashboard (EPA)	DTXSID6024965
- InChI: InChI=1S/C2HCl3O/c3-1(4)2(5)6/h1H Key: FBCCMZVIWNDFMO-UHFFFAOYSA-N
- SMILES: C(C(=O)Cl)(Cl)Cl

Properties
Chemical formula	C_{2}HCl_{3}O
Molar mass	147.38 g·mol^{−1}
Appearance	colorless fuming liquid
Density	1.5315 g/cm^{3}
Boiling point	107 °C (225 °F; 380 K)
- Except where otherwise noted, data are given for materials in their standard state (at 25 °C [77 °F], 100 kPa). Infobox references

Dichloroacetyl chloride is the organic compound with the formula CHCl_{2}COCl. It is the acyl chloride of dichloroacetic acid. It is a colourless liquid and is used in acylation reactions.

== Preparation ==
Unlike typical acid chlorides, which are often prepared from the associated carboxylic acid, dichloroacetyl chloride is not prepared from dichloroacetic acid. Instead, industrial routes include oxidation of 1,1,2-trichloroethane, hydrolysis of pentachloroethane, and the carboxylation of chloroform:

CHCl_{2}CH_{2}Cl + O_{2} → CHCl_{2}COCl + H_{2}O
CHCl_{2}CCl_{3} + H_{2}O → CHCl_{2}COCl + 2 HCl
CHCl_{3} + CO_{2} → CHCl_{2}COCl + 1/2 O_{2}

== Uses ==
It is a precursor to various herbicides including dichlormid. It is one of the precursors to antibiotics, including chloramphenicol.

== Selected reactions ==
Dichloroacetyl chloride undergoes dehydrochlorination upon treatment with base to generate dichloroketene.

Hydrolysis of dichloroacetyl chloride gives dichloroacetic acid.
