= Chloroacetic acid =

- Chloroacetic acid

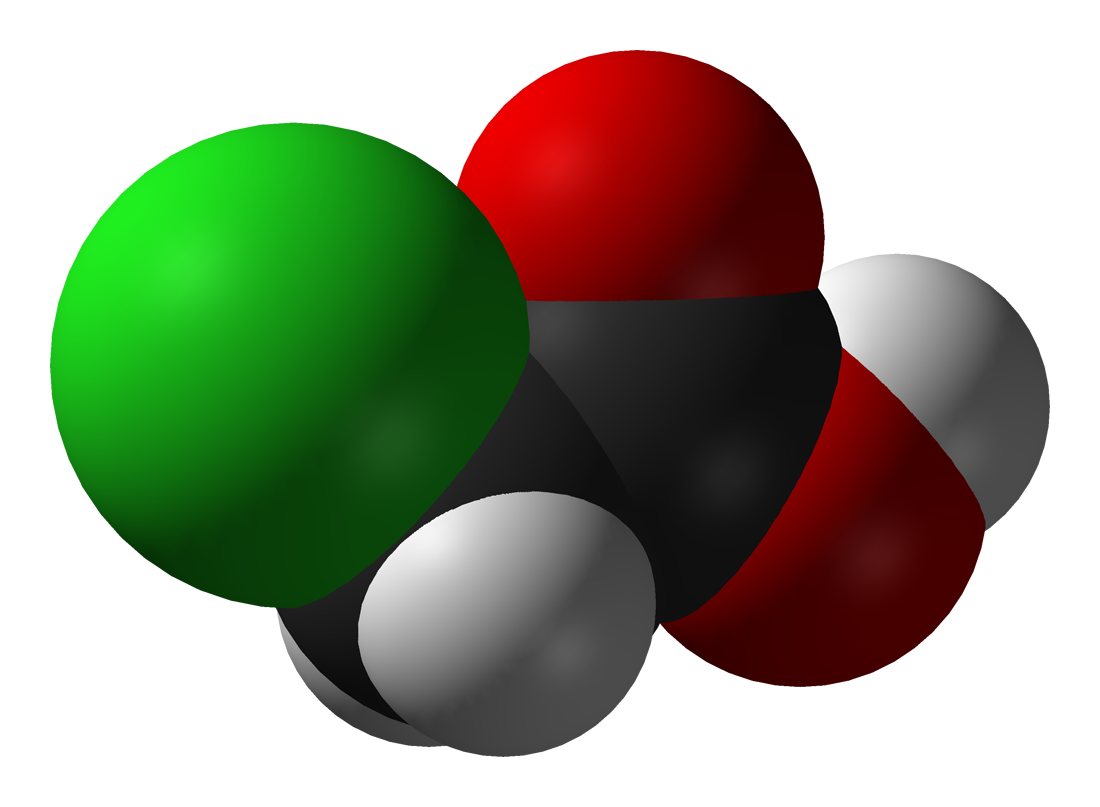
- Chloroacetic acid

Names
- Preferred IUPAC name Chloroacetic acid
- Systematic IUPAC name Chloroethanoic acid
- Other names 2-Chloroacetic acid 2-Chloroethanoic acid

Identifiers
CAS Number	79-11-8
3D model (JSmol)	Interactive image
ChEBI	CHEBI:27869
ChEMBL	ChEMBL14090
ChemSpider	10772140
ECHA InfoCard	100.001.072
EC Number	201-178-4
KEGG	D07677; C06755
PubChem CID	300
RTECS number	AF8575000
UNII	5GD84Y125G
CompTox Dashboard (EPA)	DTXSID4020901
- InChI: InChI=1S/C2H3ClO2/c3-1-2(4)5/h1H2,(H,4,5) Key: FOCAUTSVDIKZOP-UHFFFAOYSA-N; InChI=1/C2H3ClO2/c3-1-2(4)5/h1H2,(H,4,5) Key: FOCAUTSVDIKZOP-UHFFFAOYAR
- SMILES: ClCC(O)=O

Properties
Chemical formula	C_{2}H_{3}ClO_{2}
Molar mass	94.49 g·mol^{−1}
Appearance	Colorless or white crystals
Density	1.58 g/cm^{3}
Melting point	63 °C (145 °F; 336 K)
Boiling point	189.3 °C (372.7 °F; 462.4 K)
Solubility in water	85.8 g/(100 mL) (25 °C)
Solubility	Soluble in methanol, acetone, diethyl ether, benzene, chloroform, ethanol
log P	0.22
Vapor pressure	0.22 hPa
Acidity (pK_{a})	2.86
Magnetic susceptibility (χ)	−48.1×10^{−6} cm^{3}/mol
Refractive index (n_{D})	1.4351 (55 °C)

Structure
Crystal structure	Monoclinic

Thermochemistry
Heat capacity (C)	144.02 J/(K·mol)
Std enthalpy of formation (Δ_{f}H^{⦵}_{298})	−490.1 kJ/mol

Hazards
- Occupational safety and health (OHS/OSH)
Main hazards	alkylating agent
- GHS labelling
Pictograms	(GHS05: Corrosive) (GHS06: Toxic) (GHS09: Environmental hazard)
Signal word	Danger
Hazard statements	H301, H311, H314, H331, H400
Precautionary statements	P260, P264, P270, P271, P273, P280, P301+P310, P301+P330+P331, P302+P352, P303+P361+P353, P304+P340, P305+P351+P338, P310, P311, P312, P321, P322, P330, P361, P363, P391, P403+P233, P405, P501
NFPA 704 (fire diamond)	3 1 0
Flash point	126 °C (259 °F; 399 K)
Autoignition temperature	470 °C (878 °F; 743 K)
- Lethal dose or concentration (LD, LC)
LD_{50} (median dose)	76 mg/kg
Safety data sheet (SDS)	External MSDS

Related compounds
Related compounds	Dichloroacetic acid; Trichloroacetic acid; Fluoroacetic acid; Bromoacetic acid; Iodoacetic acid; Acetic acid; 2-Chloropropionic acid; 3-Chloropropanoic acid; 2,2-Dichloropropionic acid; Sodium chloroacetate
- Except where otherwise noted, data are given for materials in their standard state (at 25 °C [77 °F], 100 kPa). verify (what is ?) Infobox references

Chloroacetic acid, industrially known as monochloroacetic acid (MCA), is a organochlorine compound and carboxylic acid with the formula ClCH_{2}CO_{2}H; it is the simplest of the chloroacetic acids. This colorless solid is a useful building block in organic synthesis.

== Production ==
Chloroacetic acid was first prepared (in impure form) by the French chemist Félix LeBlanc (1813–1886) in 1843 by chlorinating acetic acid in the presence of sunlight, and in 1857 (in pure form) by the German chemist Reinhold Hoffmann (1831–1919) by refluxing glacial acetic acid in the presence of chlorine and sunlight, and then by the French chemist Charles Adolphe Wurtz by hydrolysis of chloroacetyl chloride (ClCH_{2}COCl), also in 1857.

Chloroacetic acid is prepared industrially by two routes. The predominant method involves chlorination of acetic acid, with acetic anhydride as a catalyst:

H_{3}C−COOH + Cl_{2} → ClH_{2}C−COOH + HCl

This route suffers from the production of dichloroacetic acid and trichloroacetic acid as impurities, which are difficult to separate by distillation:

H_{3}C−COOH + 2 Cl_{2} → Cl_{2}HC−COOH + 2 HCl
H_{3}C−COOH + 3 Cl_{2} → Cl_{3}C−COOH + 3 HCl

The second method entails hydrolysis of trichloroethylene:

ClHC=CCl_{2} + 2 H_{2}O → ClH_{2}C−COOH + 2 HCl

The hydrolysis is conducted at 130–140 °C in a concentrated (at least 75%) solution of sulfuric acid. This method produces a highly pure product, unlike the halogenation route. However, the significant quantities of HCl released have led to the increased popularity of the halogenation route. Approximately 420,000 tonnes are produced globally per year.

== Uses and reactions ==
Most reactions take advantage of the high reactivity of the C−Cl bond.

In its largest-scale application, chloroacetic acid is used to prepare the thickening agent carboxymethyl cellulose and carboxymethyl starch.

Chloroacetic acid is also used in the production of phenoxy herbicides by etherification with chlorophenols. In this way 2-methyl-4-chlorophenoxyacetic acid (MCPA), 2,4-dichlorophenoxyacetic acid, and 2,4,5-trichlorophenoxyacetic acid (2,4,5-T) are produced. It is the precursor to the herbicide glyphosate and dimethoate. Chloroacetic acid is converted to chloroacetyl chloride, a precursor to adrenaline (epinephrine). Displacement of chloride by sulfide gives thioglycolic acid, which is used as a stabilizer in PVC and a component in some cosmetics.

Illustrative of its usefulness in organic chemistry is the O-alkylation of salicylaldehyde with chloroacetic acid, followed by decarboxylation of the resulting ether, producing benzofuran.

== Safety ==
Like other haloalkanes, chloroacetic acid is a hazardous alkylating agent. The LD_{50} for rats is 76 mg/kg.

It is classified as an extremely hazardous substance in the United States as defined in Section 302 of the U.S. Emergency Planning and Community Right-to-Know Act (42 U.S.C. 11002), and is subject to strict reporting requirements by facilities which produce, store, or use it in significant quantities.

== See also ==
- Fluoroacetic acid
