= Trichloroacetic acid =

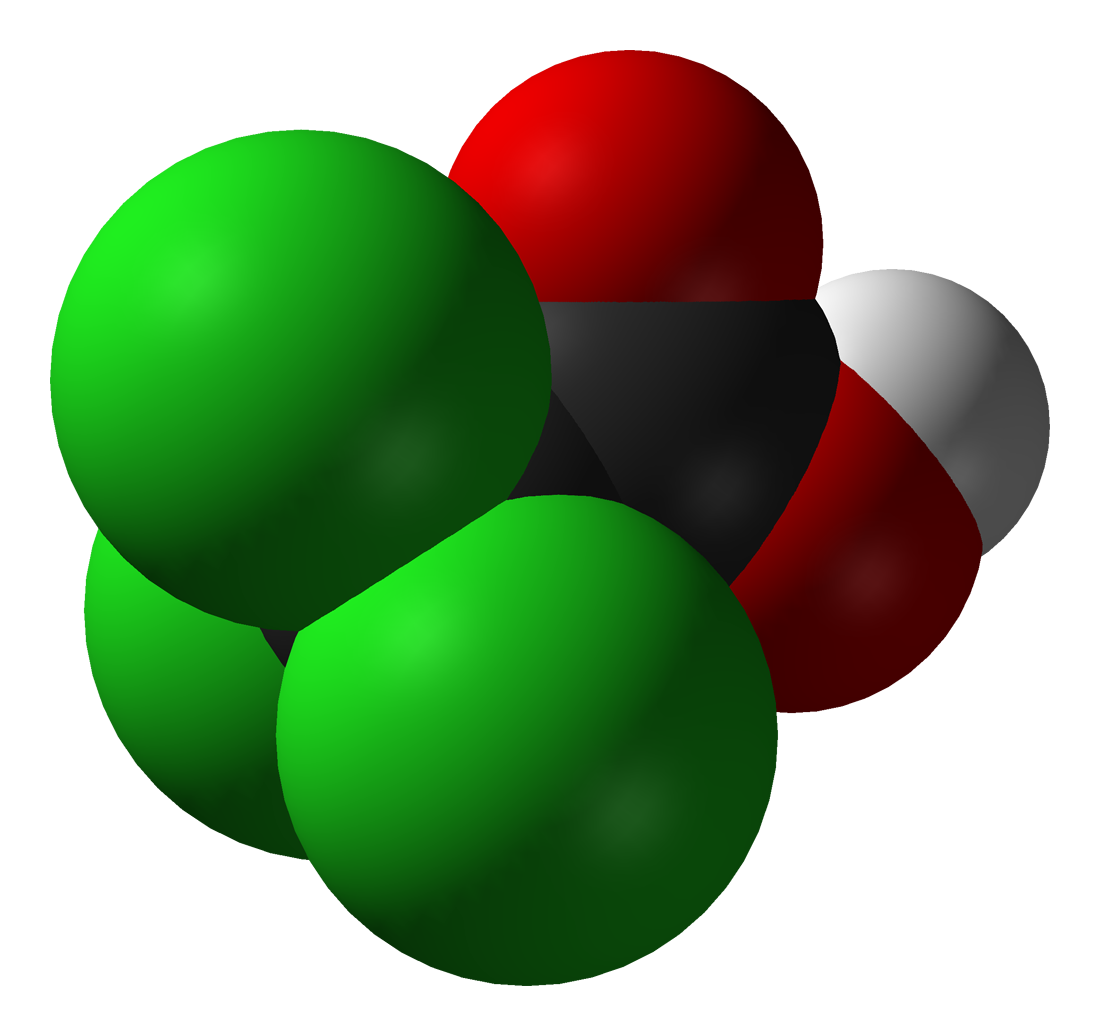

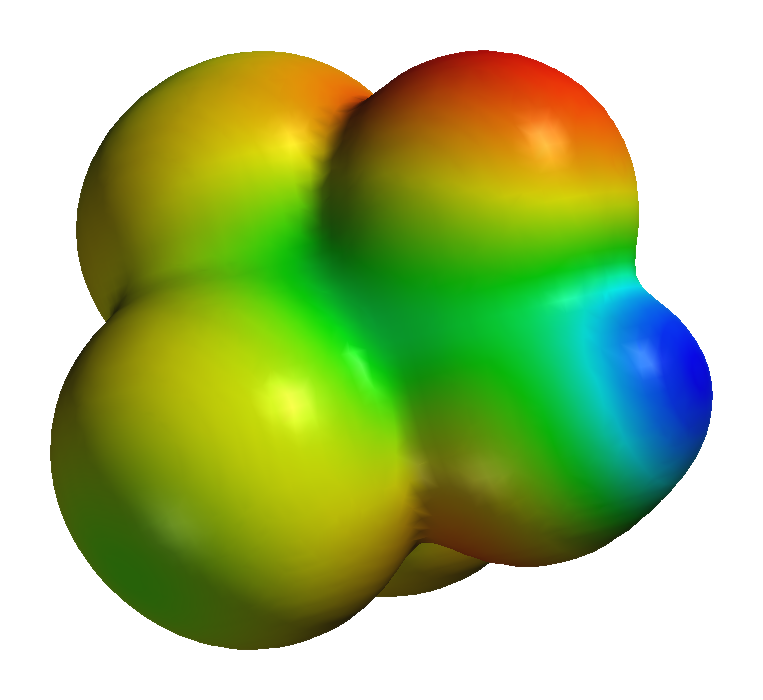

Names
- Preferred IUPAC name Trichloroacetic acid

Identifiers
| CAS Number | 76-03-9 |
| 3D model (JSmol) | Interactive image |
| Beilstein Reference | 970119 |
| ChEBI | CHEBI:30956 |
| ChEMBL | ChEMBL14053 |
| ChemSpider | 10772050 |
| ECHA InfoCard | 100.000.844 |
| Gmelin Reference | 2842 |
| KEGG | C11150 |
| PubChem CID | 6421 |
| RTECS number | AJ7875000 |
| UNII | 5V2JDO056X |
| CompTox Dashboard (EPA) | DTXSID1021378 |
- InChI: InChI=1S/C2HCl3O2/c3-2(4,5)1(6)7/h(H,6,7) Key: YNJBWRMUSHSURL-UHFFFAOYSA-N
- SMILES: ClC(Cl)(Cl)C(O)=O

Properties
| Chemical formula | C_{2}HCl_{3}O_{2} |
| Molar mass | 163.38 g·mol^{−1} |
| Appearance | Colorless to white, crystalline solid |
| Odor | Sharp, pungent |
| Density | 1.63 g/cm^{3} |
| Melting point | 57 to 58 °C (135 to 136 °F; 330 to 331 K) |
| Boiling point | 196 to 197 °C (385 to 387 °F; 469 to 470 K) |
| Solubility in water | 1000 g/100 mL |
| Vapor pressure | 1 mmHg (51.1 °C) |
| Acidity (pK_{a}) | 0.66 |
| Magnetic susceptibility (χ) | −73.0·10^{−6} cm^{3}/mol |

Structure
| Dipole moment | 3.23 D |

Hazards
- GHS labelling
| Pictograms | (GHS05: Corrosive) (GHS09: Environmental hazard) |
| Signal word | Danger |
| Hazard statements | H314, H410 |
| Precautionary statements | P260, P264, P273, P280, P301+P330+P331, P303+P361+P353, P304+P340, P305+P351+P338, P310, P321, P363, P391, P405, P501 |
| NFPA 704 (fire diamond) | 3 1 0 |
- Lethal dose or concentration (LD, LC)
| LD_{50} (median dose) | 5000 mg/kg (rat, oral) |
- NIOSH (US health exposure limits)
| PEL (Permissible) | None |
| REL (Recommended) | TWA 1 ppm (7 mg/m^{3}) |
| IDLH (Immediate danger) | N.D. |

Related compounds
| Related chloroacetic acids | Chloroacetic acid; Dichloroacetic acid |
| Related compounds | Acetic acid; Trifluoroacetic acid; Tribromoacetic acid; Triiodoacetic acid |
- Except where otherwise noted, data are given for materials in their standard state (at 25 °C [77 °F], 100 kPa). verify (what is ?) Infobox references

Trichloroacetic acid (TCA; TCAA; also known as trichloroethanoic acid) is an organochlorine compound with the formula CCl_{3}CO_{2}H. It is an analogue of acetic acid in which the three hydrogen atoms of the methyl group have all been replaced by chlorine atoms. It is a colorless solid that dissolves in water.

Salts and esters of trichloroacetic acid are called trichloroacetates.

== Synthesis and reactivity ==
It is prepared by the reaction of chlorine with acetic acid in the presence of a suitable catalyst such as red phosphorus.

CH_{3}CO_{2}H + 3 Cl_{2} → CCl_{3}CO_{2}H + 3 HCl

Another route to trichloroacetic acid is the oxidation of trichloroacetaldehyde.

In water, trichloroacetic acid converts to trichloroacetate as indicated by its low pKa. Thus trichloroacetic acid does not exist in aqueous solution, on the conjugate base. It can be converted to trichloroacetyl chloride using thionyl chloride.

== Use ==
It is a precursor to various herbicides. Sodium trichloroacetate was marketed as such in the 1950s but has since been highly regulated.

=== Niche ===
Trichloroacetic acid is widely used in biochemistry for the precipitation of macromolecules, such as proteins, DNA, and RNA. TCA is used during oligonucleotide synthesis during the "deblocking" step to remove the dimethoxytrityl protecting group from the growing DNA/RNA strand for the next nucleotide incorporation.

TCA and DCA are both used in cosmetic treatments (such as chemical peels and tattoo removal) and as topical medication for chemoablation of warts, including genital warts. It can kill normal cells as well. It is considered safe for use for this purpose during pregnancy.

== Toxicity ==
According to the European Chemicals Agency, "This substance causes severe skin burns and eye damage, is very toxic to aquatic life and has long lasting toxic effects."

== History ==
The discovery of trichloroacetic acid by Jean-Baptiste Dumas in 1839 delivered a striking example to the slowly evolving theory of organic radicals and valences. The theory was contrary to the beliefs of Jöns Jakob Berzelius, starting a long dispute between Dumas and Berzelius.

== Popular culture ==
In the 1958 film The Blob, a bottle of trichloroacetic acid is tossed at the Blob in a futile attempt to fend it off.

== See also ==
- Chloroacetic acids
