= Methyl chloroformate =

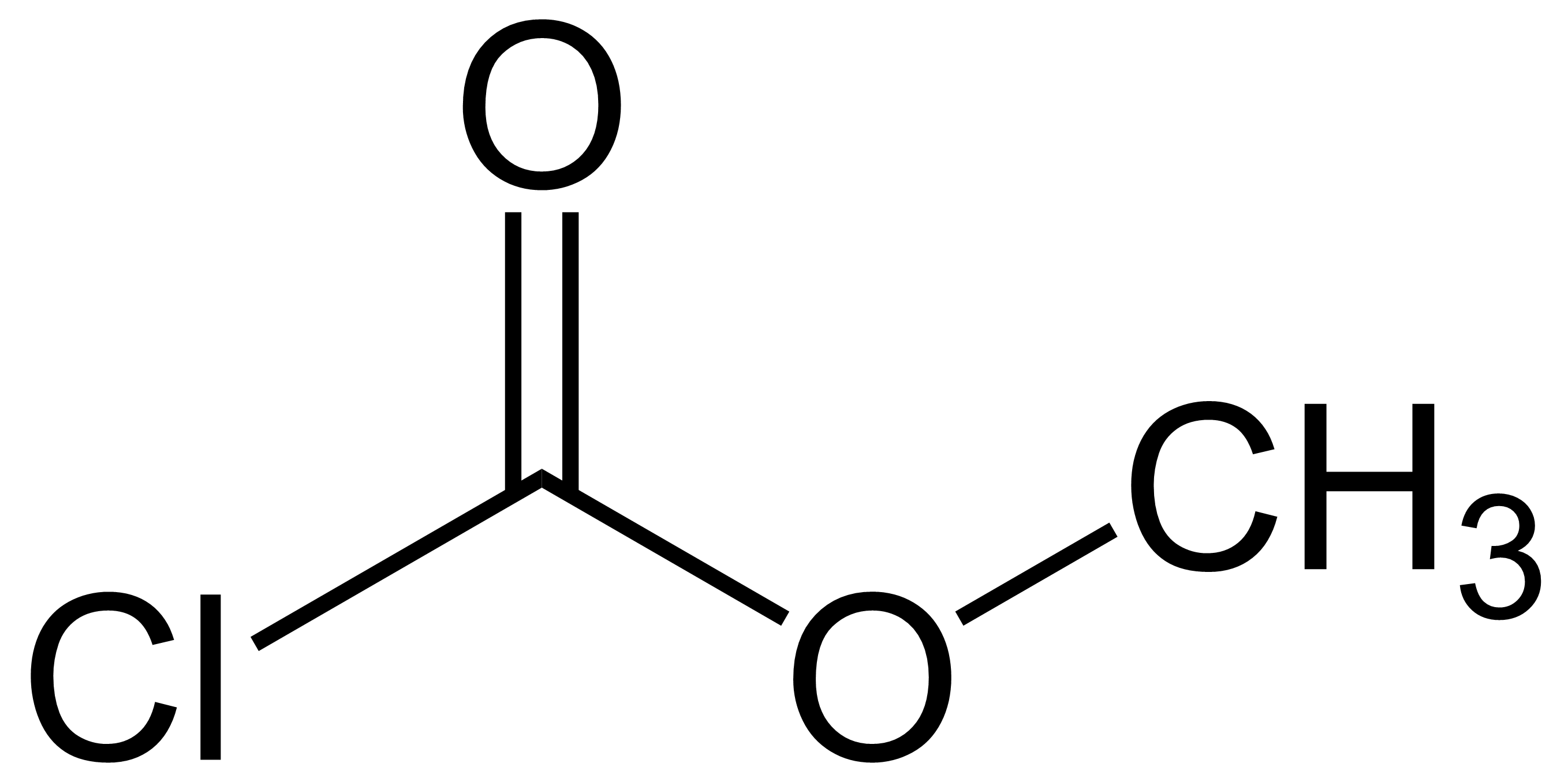

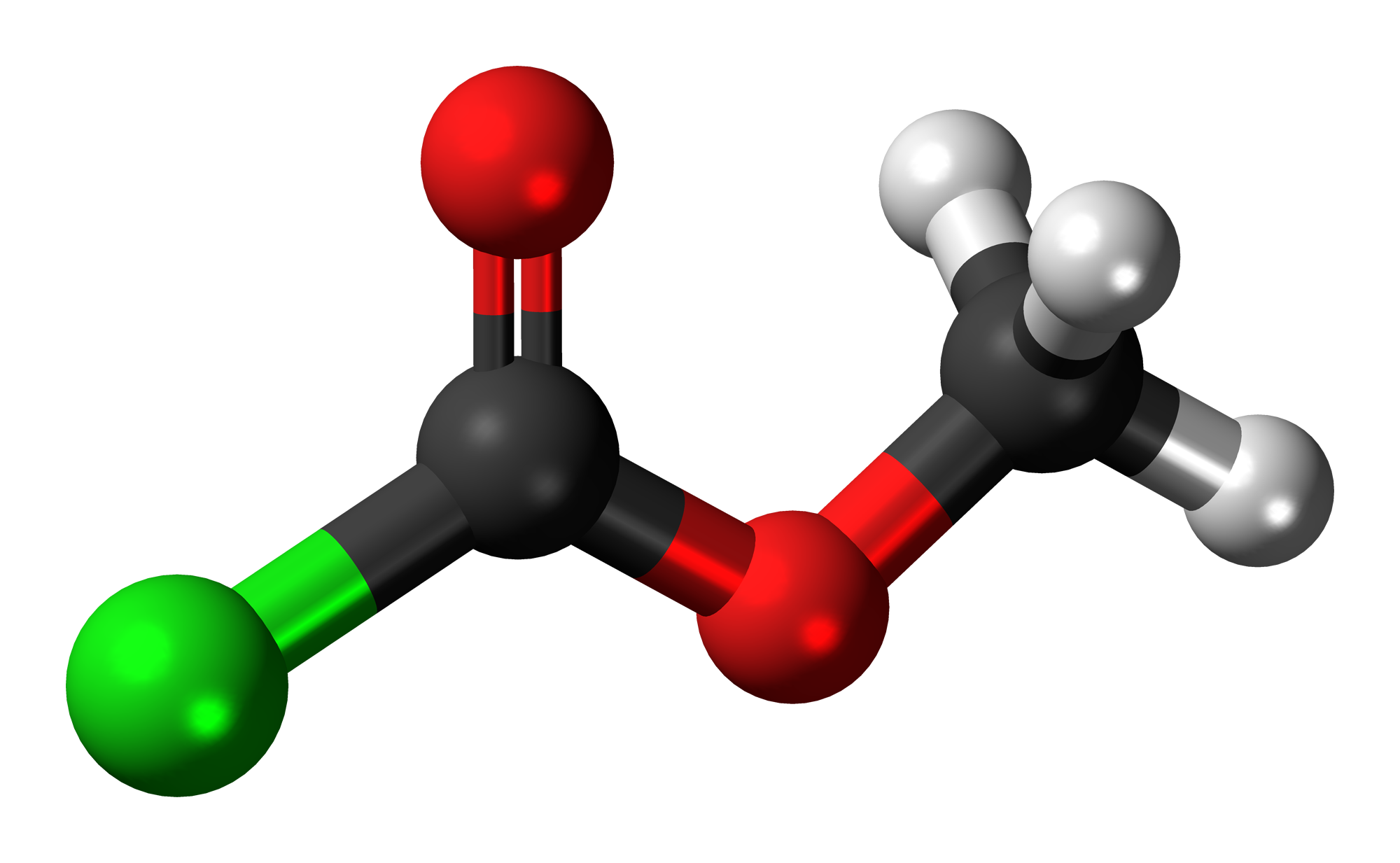

Names
- Preferred IUPAC name Methyl carbonochloridate
- Other names Methyl chloroformate, Chlorocarbonic methyl ester, Methyl chlorocarbonate

Identifiers
CAS Number	79-22-1
3D model (JSmol)	Interactive image; Interactive image
Beilstein Reference	605437
ChemSpider	6337
ECHA InfoCard	100.001.080
EC Number	201-187-3
PubChem CID	6586
UNII	RC6VA8OB2N
CompTox Dashboard (EPA)	DTXSID0024185
- InChI: InChI=1S/C2H3ClO2/c1-5-2(3)4/h1H3 Key: XMJHPCRAQCTCFT-UHFFFAOYSA-N; InChI=1/C2H3ClO2/c1-5-2(3)4/h1H3 Key: XMJHPCRAQCTCFT-UHFFFAOYAT
- SMILES: O=C(Cl)OC; ClC(=O)OC

Properties
Chemical formula	ClC(O)OCH_{3}
Molar mass	94.49 g·mol^{−1}
Appearance	Colorless oily liquid
Odor	Pungent
Density	1.223 g/mL
Boiling point	70 to 72 °C (158 to 162 °F; 343 to 345 K)

Hazards
- GHS labelling
Pictograms	(GHS02: Flammable) (GHS05: Corrosive) (GHS06: Toxic)
Signal word	Danger
Hazard statements	H225, H302, H312, H314, H330
Precautionary statements	P210, P233, P240, P241, P242, P243, P260, P264, P270, P271, P280, P284, P301+P312, P301+P330+P331, P302+P352, P303+P361+P353, P304+P340, P305+P351+P338, P310, P312, P320, P321, P330, P363, P370+P378, P403+P233, P403+P235, P405, P501
Flash point	10 °C (50 °F; 283 K)
- Except where otherwise noted, data are given for materials in their standard state (at 25 °C [77 °F], 100 kPa). verify (what is ?) Infobox references

Methyl chloroformate is a chemical compound with the chemical formula Cl−C(=O)−O−CH_{3}. It is the methyl ester of chloroformic acid. It is an oily colorless liquid, although aged samples appear yellow. It is also known for its pungent odor.

== Preparation ==
Methyl chloroformate can be synthesized using anhydrous methanol and phosgene.

COCl_{2} + CH_{3}OH → ClC(O)OCH_{3} + HCl

== Properties ==
Methyl chloroformate hydrolyzes in water to form methanol, hydrochloric acid, and carbon dioxide. This decomposition happens violently in the presence of steam, causing foaming. The compound decomposes in heat, which can liberate hydrogen chloride, phosgene, chlorine, or other toxic gases.

== Uses ==
Methyl chloroformate is used in organic synthesis for the introduction of the methoxycarbonyl functionality to a suitable nucleophile (i.e. carbomethoxylation).

== Safety ==
Methyl chloroformate forms highly flammable vapour-air mixtures. The compound has a flash point of 10 °C. Methyl chloroformate, if heated, releases phosgene. It produces hydrogen chloride upon contact with water. It will cause skin damage if in contact with skin.

== See also ==
- Methyl cyanoformate
