= Chloroformate =

Esters of chloroformic acid

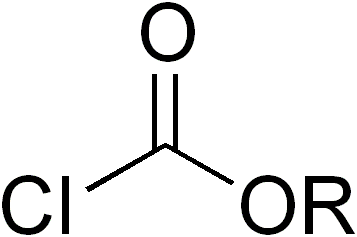
General chemical structure of chloroformate esters

Chloroformates are a class of organic compounds with the formula ROC(O)Cl. They are formally esters of chloroformic acid. Most are colorless, volatile liquids that degrade in moist air. Important chloroformate esters include 4-nitrophenyl chloroformate, fluorenylmethyloxycarbonylchloride, benzyl chloroformate and ethyl chloroformate. A simple example is methyl chloroformate, which is also commercially available.

Chloroformates are used as reagents in organic chemistry. For example, benzyl chloroformate is used to introduce the Cbz (carboxybenzyl) protecting group and fluorenylmethyloxycarbonyl chloride is used to introduce the FMOC protecting group. Chloroformates are popular in the field of chromatography as derivatization agents. They convert polar compounds into less polar more volatile derivatives. In this way, chloroformates enable relatively simple transformation of large array of metabolites (aminoacids, amines, carboxylic acids, phenols) for analysis by gas chromatography / mass spectrometry.

== Reactions ==
The reactivity of chloroformates and acyl chlorides are similar. Representative reactions are:

- Reaction with amines to form carbamates:

ROC(O)Cl + H_{2}NR' → ROC(O)-N(H)R' + HCl

- Reaction with alcohols to form carbonate esters:

ROC(O)Cl + HOR' → ROC(O)-OR' + HCl

- Reaction with carboxylic acids to form mixed anhydrides:

ROC(O)Cl + HO_{2}CR' → ROC(O)−OC(O)R' + HCl

Typically these reactions would be conducted in the presence of a base which serves to absorb the HCl.

Alkyl chloroformate esters degrade to give the alkyl chloride, with retention of configuration:

ROC(O)Cl ' → RCl + CO_{2}

The reaction is proposed to proceed via a substitution nucleophilic internal mechanism.
