= Ethyl chloroformate =

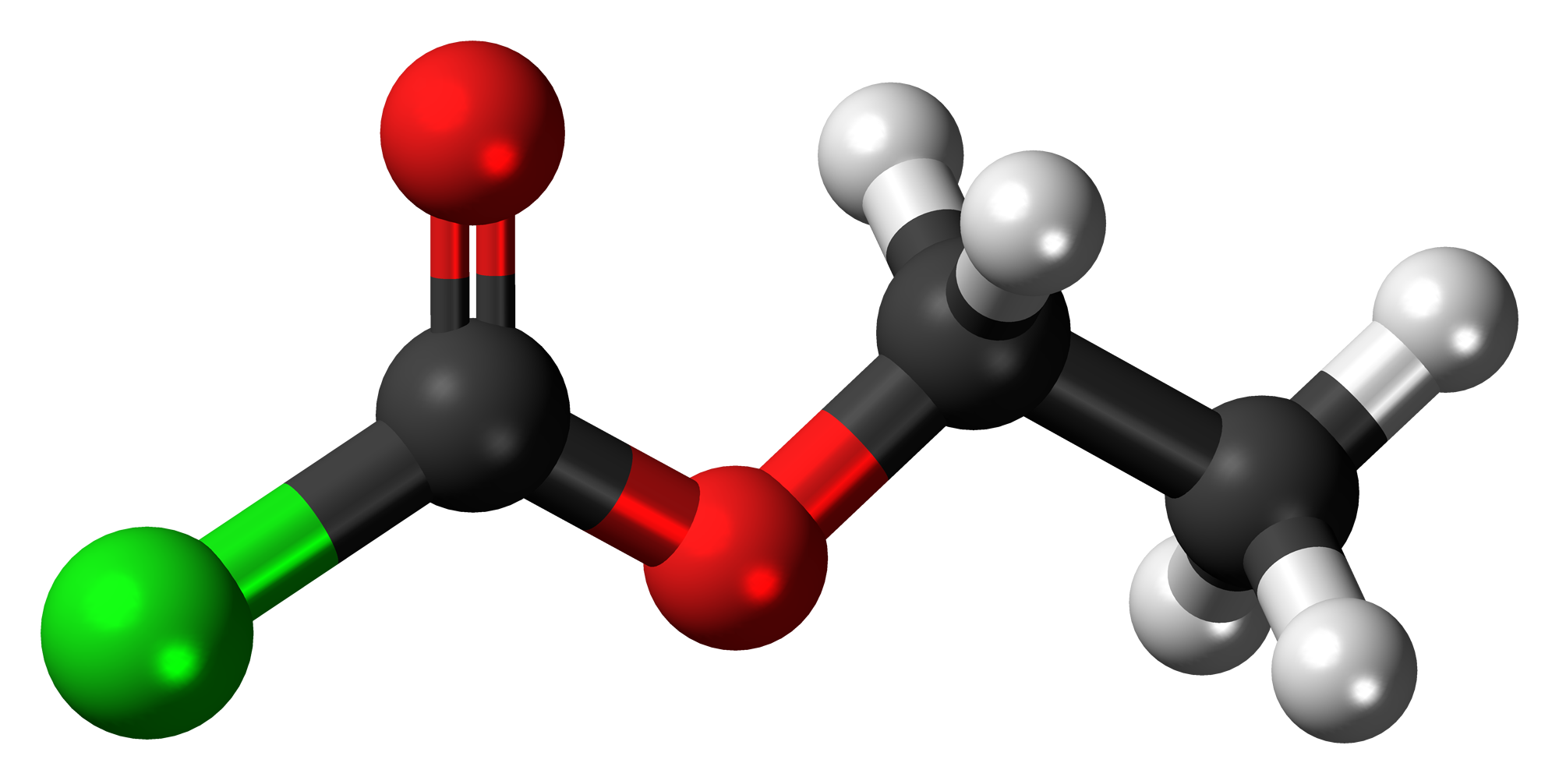

Names
- Preferred IUPAC name Ethyl carbonochloridate
- Other names: Cathyl chloride; Chloroformic acid ethyl ester; Ethyl chlorocarbonate; TL-423

Identifiers
CAS Number	541-41-3
3D model (JSmol)	Interactive image
ChemSpider	10465
ECHA InfoCard	100.007.981
EC Number	208-778-5
PubChem CID	10928
RTECS number	LQ6125000
UNII	09601EZP9R
UN number	1182
CompTox Dashboard (EPA)	DTXSID1027186
- InChI: InChI=1S/C3H5ClO2/c1-2-6-3(4)5/h2H2,1H3 Key: RIFGWPKJUGCATF-UHFFFAOYSA-N; InChI=1/C3H5ClO2/c1-2-6-3(4)5/h2H2,1H3 Key: RIFGWPKJUGCATF-UHFFFAOYAX
- SMILES: ClC(=O)OCC

Properties
Chemical formula	C_{3}H_{5}ClO_{2}
Molar mass	108.52 g·mol^{−1}
Appearance	Colorless liquid
Odor	Like hydrochloric acid
Density	1.1403 g/cm^{3}
Melting point	−81 °C (−114 °F; 192 K)
Boiling point	95 °C (203 °F; 368 K)
Solubility in water	Decomposes

Hazards
- Occupational safety and health (OHS/OSH)
Main hazards	Corrosive; Flammable
- GHS labelling
Pictograms	(GHS02: Flammable) (GHS05: Corrosive) (GHS06: Toxic) (GHS07: Exclamation mark)
Signal word	Danger
Hazard statements	H225, H302, H314, H330
Precautionary statements	P210, P233, P240, P241, P242, P243, P260, P264, P270, P271, P280, P284, P301+P312, P301+P330+P331, P303+P361+P353, P304+P340, P305+P351+P338, P310, P320, P321, P330, P363, P370+P378, P403+P233, P403+P235, P405, P501
NFPA 704 (fire diamond)	4 3 0 W
Flash point	16 °C (61 °F; 289 K)
- Except where otherwise noted, data are given for materials in their standard state (at 25 °C [77 °F], 100 kPa). verify (what is ?) Infobox references

Ethyl chloroformate is an organic compound with the chemical formula ClCO_{2}CH_{2}CH_{3}. It is the ethyl ester of chloroformic acid. It is a colorless, corrosive and highly toxic liquid. It is a reagent used in organic synthesis for the introduction of the ethyl carbamate protecting group and for the formation of carboxylic anhydrides.

== Preparation ==
Ethyl chloroformate can be prepared using ethanol and phosgene:

== Safety ==
Ethyl chloroformate is a highly toxic, flammable, corrosive substance. It causes severe burns when comes in contact with eyes and/or skin, can be harmful if swallowed or inhaled.
