= Dalapon =

Weed control herbicide

Names
- Preferred IUPAC name 2,2-Dichloropropanoic acid
- Other names: 2,2-DPA; α,α-Dichloropropionic acid

Identifiers
CAS Number	75-99-0
3D model (JSmol)	Interactive image
ChEBI	CHEBI:81859
ChEMBL	ChEMBL445525
ChemSpider	6178
ECHA InfoCard	100.000.840
EC Number	200-923-0
KEGG	C18600
PubChem CID	6418
RTECS number	UF0690000
UNII	VO6PY8ZMRW
UN number	1760
CompTox Dashboard (EPA)	DTXSID2021575
- InChI: InChI=1S/C3H4Cl2O2/c1-3(4,5)2(6)7/h1H3,(H,6,7) Key: NDUPDOJHUQKPAG-UHFFFAOYSA-N
- SMILES: CC(C(=O)O)(Cl)Cl

Properties
Chemical formula	C_{3}H_{4}Cl_{2}O_{2}
Molar mass	142.96 g·mol^{−1}
Appearance	colorless oil, white-tan powder when frozen
Odor	acrid
Density	1.40 g/cm^{3} (20 °C)
Melting point	8 °C; 46 °F; 281 K
Boiling point	190 °C; 374 °F; 463 K
Solubility in water	800 g/L at 25°C

Hazards
- GHS labelling
Pictograms	(GHS05: Corrosive) (GHS07: Exclamation mark)
Signal word	Danger
Hazard statements	H315, H318, H412
Precautionary statements	P264, P273, P280, P302+P352, P305+P351+P338, P310, P321, P332+P313, P362, P501

Related compounds
Related compounds	Dalapon-sodium; Dalapon-calcium; Dalapon-magnesium
- Except where otherwise noted, data are given for materials in their standard state (at 25 °C [77 °F], 100 kPa). Infobox references

Dalapon, chemical name 2,2-dichloropropanoic acid, (shortened: 2-DPA), is a selective herbicide active ingredient; its major use is controlling perennial grasses on crops, including sugar cane and sugar beet.

"Dalapon" is not a tradename, but a recognised common name. It is usually sold as a salt form, e.g. dalapon-sodium, dalapon-calcium or dalapon-magnesium; most commonly dalapon-sodium.

As of 2026, dalapon is available in Australia. Its use is no longer authorized in France. It was registered in the USA in 1969, and delisted in 1989. The first public use came in 1954.

== Properties ==
Dalapon is an organochloride, carboxylic acid herbicide. In pure form, it is a colorless liquid that freezes near room temperature.

== Safety ==
Dalapon is readily absorbed and disperses widely in the body, but has no observable acute effects. The EPA thinks it safe for a child to ingest 3 mg of dalapon per day for 10 days or 0.3 mg daily for seven years, in drinking water. If chronic, above-limit exposure occurs, dalapon might make the kidney heavier.

== Mechanism of action ==
It is an inhibitor of some enzymes that process pyruvate.

Dalapon-magnesium's mode of action (unknown) puts it in Group Z / Group 0 under the HRAC classification.

== Applications ==
Dalapon has been registered (as the sodium salt) for use on pasture, fruits (inslcuding apples, bananas, black and red currants, cherries, peaches, apricots, citrus, pears), cotton, lucerne, maize, potatoes, soybean, sugar cane, sunflower, tea-trees, tobacco, vines and non crop areas, including irrigation channels and drains.

In the USA, dalapon was sold as dalapon-sodium or a mixture of dalapon-sodium and dalapon-magnesium. In 1982, approx. 8 million pounds (3,600 t) was used, 93% of which was for non-food uses in 1984, and most of the food use was on sugarbeet.

On most of those crops, it is recommended to be sprayed (when using a 740 g/L water-based formulation) at 3.7-7.4 kg/Ha (active ingredient) (3.3-6.6 lb/ac), but with some situations can be 1.85-14.8 kg/Ha (1.65-13.2 lb/ac).

== Environmental Fate ==
In soil, dalapon is mainly reduced by leaching and microbial degradation. It leaches readily. Without microbes, degradation is slow. Dalapon persists for two to four weeks in typical farm soil, though up to six months has been seen in forests.

In water, the half-life is several months when cold. It degrades mostly by hydrolysis and microbial degradation. Hydrolysis forms pyruvic acid. In good conditions for microbes, the decomposition will probably finish inside of a month. Photolysis may or may not be a significant sink for dalapon.

Bioconcentration is not expected to be a concern. In the atmosphere, dalapon should be reduced by photolysis with a half life of 72 days.
