= Roberts Filter Group =

- Roberts Filter Group logo
- Type: Privately held company
- Industry: Filter industry
- Predecessor: Roberts Filter Manufacturing Co.
- Founded: 1889 in Philadelphia, Pennsylvania, USA
- Founder: Charles V. Roberts
- Headquarters: Media, Pennsylvania, United States
- Area served: Worldwide
- Key people: Charles V. Roberts (Founder); Charles V. Roberts III (Former President); R. Lee Roberts (CEO and President)
- Products: Water filters, Rapid gravity filter, Ion exchange, Backwashing technology, Carbon filtering, Dissolved air flotation, Lamella clarifier, Sedimentation
- Website: robertsfilter.com

Roberts Filter Group is an American water filter production company founded in 1889 in Philadelphia, Pennsylvania, United States. The company is currently headquartered in Media, Pennsylvania and it is one of the largest suppliers of water-filtration products and services in the United States. They are known for providing water treatment facilities for the Manhattan Project during World War II.

== History ==
In 1889, Charles Roberts, the founder of Roberts Filter Manufacturing Co., now called Roberts Filter Group, patented his household stone filters. In 1909, Roberts Filter Manufacturing Co. provided the filtration equipment for one of the first major municipal treatment plants, New Orleans, United States, with the capacity of 40 million gallons per day.

During World War I, the company produced and supplied filters capable of producing 155,000,000 gallons per day, which would supplied every inhabitant in the United States with about one and one half gallons of water each per day. The company also supplied about 600,000 75 millimeter high explosive shells for Canon de 75 modèle 1897.

In 1939, the company provided water treatment facilities for the Manhattan Project by utilizing high-rate filtrated clean water. To improve the capability of filters to perform at higher rates, company's engineers developed dual media filters consisting of a layer of larger anthracite over a layer of finer sand. Large scale dual media installations were built and operated at Hanford, WA as a part of the Manhattan Project during World War II.

In 1950, Charles' son, Charles V. Roberts II, devised the first high-rate filtration method that was used in municipal market.

== Awards and recognition ==
In 1991, American Water Works Association (AWWA) introduced Roberts Filter's former president, Charles V Roberts, into Water Industry Hall of Fame, an award given to individuals that made significant contribution to the field of public water supply. The names of the members are engraved on a bronze plaque at AWWA headquarters, while the other membership plaque is presented to the recipient or the institution with whom the recipient is identified.

In 2010, Roberts Filter Group was presented the "Service to the Water Profession Award" for 100 years of service awarded by American Water Works Association.

== See also ==
- Water supply and sanitation in the United States
