= Water purification =

Process of removing impurities from water

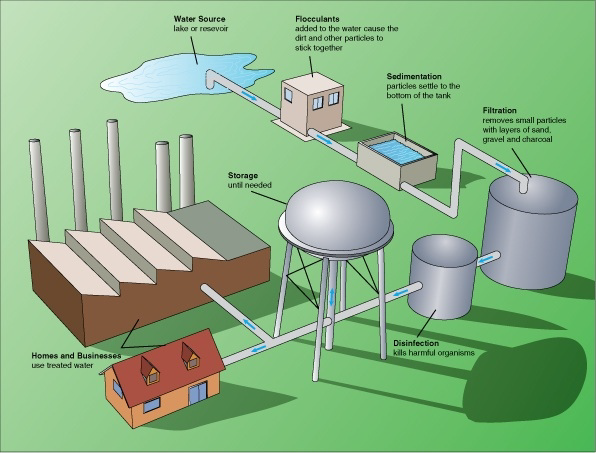
Typical drinking water treatment processes.

Water purification is the process of removing undesirable chemicals, biological contaminants, suspended solids, and gases from water. The goal is to produce water that is fit for specific purposes. Most water is purified and disinfected for human consumption (drinking water), but water purification may also be carried out for a variety of other purposes, including medical, pharmacological, chemical, and industrial applications. The history of water purification includes a wide variety of methods. The methods used include physical processes such as filtration, sedimentation, and distillation; biological processes such as slow sand filters or biologically active carbon; chemical processes such as flocculation and chlorination; and the use of electromagnetic radiation such as ultraviolet light.

Water purification can reduce the concentration of particulate matter including suspended particles, parasites, bacteria, algae, viruses, and fungi as well as reduce the concentration of a range of dissolved and particulate matter.

The standards for drinking water quality are typically set by governments or by international standards. These standards usually include minimum and maximum concentrations of contaminants, depending on the intended use of the water.

A visual inspection cannot determine if water is of appropriate quality. Simple procedures such as boiling or the use of a household point of use water filter (typically with activated carbon) are not sufficient for treating all possible contaminants that may be present in water from an unknown source. Even natural spring water—considered safe for all practical purposes in the 19th century—must now be tested before determining what kind of treatment, if any, is needed. Chemical and microbiological analysis, while expensive, are the only way to obtain the information necessary for deciding on the appropriate method of purification.

== Sources of water ==
Groundwater
The water emerging from some deep ground water may have fallen as rain many tens, hundreds, or thousands of years ago. Soil and rock layers naturally filter the ground water to a high degree of clarity and often, it does not require additional treatment besides adding chlorine or chloramines as secondary disinfectants. Such water may emerge as springs, artesian springs, or may be extracted from boreholes or wells. Deep ground water is generally of very high bacteriological quality (i.e., pathogenic bacteria or the pathogenic protozoa are typically absent), but the water may be rich in dissolved solids, especially carbonates and sulfates of calcium and magnesium. Depending on the strata through which the water has flowed, other ions may also be present including chloride, and bicarbonate. There may be a requirement to reduce the iron or manganese content of this water to make it acceptable for drinking, cooking, and laundry use. Primary disinfection may also be required. Where groundwater recharge is practised (a process in which river water is injected into an aquifer to store the water in times of plenty so that it is available in times of drought), the groundwater may require additional treatment depending on applicable state and federal regulations.
Upland lakes and reservoirs
Typically located in the headwaters of river systems, upland reservoirs are usually sited above any human habitation and may be surrounded by a protective zone to restrict the opportunities for contamination. Bacteria and pathogen levels are usually low, but some bacteria, protozoa or algae will be present. Where uplands are forested or peaty, humic acids can colour the water. Many upland sources have low pH which require adjustment.
Rivers, canals and low land reservoirs
Low land surface waters will have a significant bacterial load and may also contain algae, suspended solids and a variety of dissolved constituents.
Atmospheric water generation
A new technology that can provide high quality drinking water by extracting water from the air by cooling the air and thus condensing water vapor.
Rainwater harvesting or fog collection
Water collected from the atmosphere can be used especially in areas with significant dry seasons and in areas which experience fog even when there is little rain.
Desalination
Seawater can be desalinated by distillation or reverse osmosis.
Surface water
Freshwater bodies that are open to the atmosphere and are not designated as groundwater are termed surface waters.

== Treatment ==
=== Goals ===
The goals of water treatment are to remove unwanted constituents in the water and to make it safe to drink or fit for a specific purpose in industry or medical applications. Widely varied techniques are available to remove contaminants like fine solids, micro-organisms and some dissolved inorganic and organic materials, or environmental persistent pharmaceutical pollutants. The choice of method will depend on the quality of the water being treated, the cost of the treatment process and the quality standards expected of the processed water.

The processes below are the ones commonly used in water purification plants. Some or most may not be used depending on the scale of the plant and quality of the raw (source) water.

=== Pretreatment ===
Pumping and containment
The majority of water must be pumped from its source or directed into pipes or holding tanks. To avoid adding contaminants to the water, this physical infrastructure must be made from appropriate materials and constructed so that accidental contamination does not occur.
Screening
The first step in purifying surface water is to remove large debris such as sticks, leaves, rubbish and other large particles which may interfere with subsequent purification steps. This may involve a screen filter. Most deep groundwater does not need screening before other purification steps.
Storage
Water from rivers may also be stored in bankside reservoirs for periods between a few days and many months to allow natural biological purification to take place. This is especially important if treatment is by slow sand filters. Storage reservoirs also provide a buffer against short periods of drought or to allow water supply to be maintained during transitory pollution incidents in the source river.
Pre-chlorination
In many plants the incoming water was chlorinated to minimise the growth of fouling organisms on the pipe-work and tanks. Because of the potential adverse quality effects (see chlorine below), this has largely been discontinued.

==== pH adjustment ====
Pure water has a pH close to 7 (neither alkaline nor acidic). Sea water can have pH values that range from 7.5 to 8.4 (moderately alkaline). Fresh water can have widely ranging pH values depending on the geology of the drainage basin or aquifer and the influence of contaminant inputs (acid rain).

If the water is acidic (lower than 7), lime, soda ash, or caustic soda (sodium hydroxide) can be added to raise the pH during water purification processes and is especially common practice for water softening. The choice of chemical used for raising the pH often depends on the carbonate alkalinity in the water. Addition of such chemicals increases the carbonate ion concentration, forcing precipitation of calcium carbonate, and magnesium carbonate at even higher pH. Ultimately, the water hardness is reduced.

For highly acidic waters, forced draft degasifiers can be an effective way to raise the pH, by stripping dissolved carbon dioxide from the water. Making the water alkaline helps coagulation and flocculation processes work effectively and also helps to minimise the risk of lead being dissolved from lead pipes and from lead solder in pipe fittings. Sufficient alkalinity also reduces the corrosiveness of water to iron pipes. Acid (carbonic acid, hydrochloric acid or sulfuric acid) may be added to alkaline waters in some circumstances to lower the pH. Alkaline water (above pH 7.0) does not necessarily mean that lead or copper from the plumbing system will not be dissolved into the water. The ability of water to precipitate calcium carbonate to protect metal surfaces and reduce the likelihood of toxic metals being dissolved in water is a function of pH, mineral content, temperature, alkalinity and calcium concentration.

=== Coagulation and flocculation ===
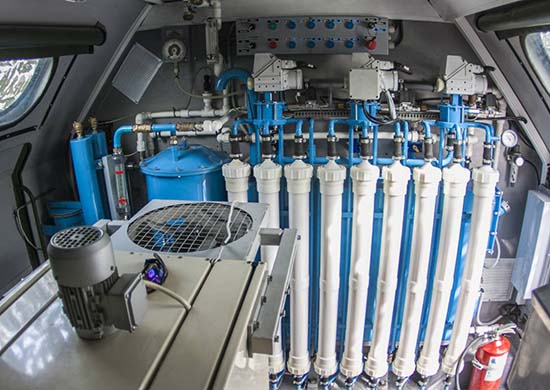
Station for complex water treatment SKO-10K.

One of the first steps in most conventional water purification processes is the addition of chemicals to assist in the removal of particles suspended in water. Particles can be inorganic such as clay and silt or organic such as algae, bacteria, viruses, protozoa and natural organic matter. Inorganic and organic particles contribute to the turbidity and colour of water.

The addition of inorganic coagulants such as aluminium sulfate (or alum) or iron (III) salts such as iron(III) chloride cause several simultaneous chemical and physical interactions on and among the particles. Within seconds, negative charges on the particles are neutralised by inorganic coagulants. Also within seconds, metal hydroxide precipitates of the iron and aluminium ions begin to form. These precipitates combine into larger particles under natural processes such as Brownian motion and through induced mixing which is sometimes referred to as flocculation. Amorphous metal hydroxides are known as "floc". Large, amorphous aluminium and iron (III) hydroxides adsorb and enmesh particles in suspension and facilitate the removal of particles by subsequent processes of sedimentation and filtration.

Aluminum hydroxides are formed within a fairly narrow pH range, typically: 5.5 to about 7.7. Iron (III) hydroxides can form over a larger pH range including pH levels lower than are effective for alum, typically: 5.0 to 8.5.

In the literature, there is much debate and confusion over the usage of the terms coagulation and flocculation: Where does coagulation end and flocculation begin? In water purification plants, there is usually a high energy, rapid mix unit process (detention time in seconds) whereby the coagulant chemicals are added followed by flocculation basins (detention times range from 15 to 45 minutes) where low energy inputs turn large paddles or other gentle mixing devices to enhance the formation of floc. In fact, coagulation and flocculation processes are ongoing once the metal salt coagulants are added.

Organic polymers were developed in the 1960s as aids to coagulants and, in some cases, as replacements for the inorganic metal salt coagulants. Synthetic organic polymers are high molecular weight compounds that carry negative, positive or neutral charges. When organic polymers are added to water with particulates, the high molecular weight compounds adsorb onto particle surfaces and through interparticle bridging coalesce with other particles to form floc. PolyDADMAC is a popular cationic (positively charged) organic polymer used in water purification plants.

=== Sedimentation ===
Waters exiting the flocculation basin may enter the sedimentation basin, also called a clarifier or settling basin. It is a large tank with low water velocities, allowing floc to settle to the bottom. The sedimentation basin is best located close to the flocculation basin so the transit between the two processes does not permit settlement or floc break up. Sedimentation basins may be rectangular, where water flows from end to end, or circular where flow is from the centre outward. Sedimentation basin outflow is typically over a weir so only a thin top layer of water—that furthest from the sludge—exits.

In 1904, Allen Hazen showed that the efficiency of a sedimentation process was a function of the particle settling velocity, the flow through the tank and the surface area of tank. Sedimentation tanks are typically designed within a range of overflow rates of 0.5 to 1.0 gallons per minute per square foot (or 1250 to 2500 litres per square meter per hour). In general, sedimentation basin efficiency is not a function of detention time or depth of the basin. Although, basin depth must be sufficient so that water currents do not disturb the sludge and settled particle interactions are promoted. As particle concentrations in the settled water increase near the sludge surface on the bottom of the tank, settling velocities can increase due to collisions and agglomeration of particles. Typical detention times for sedimentation vary from 1.5 to 4 hours and basin depths vary from 10 to 15 feet (3 to 4.5 meters).

Lamella clarifiers, inclined flat plates or tubes can be added to traditional sedimentation basins to improve particle removal performance. Inclined plates and tubes drastically increase the surface area available for particles to be removed in concert with Hazen's original theory. The amount of ground surface area occupied by a sedimentation basin with inclined plates or tubes can be far smaller than a conventional sedimentation basin.

==== Sludge storage and removal ====
As particles settle to the bottom of a sedimentation basin, a layer of sludge is formed on the floor of the tank which must be removed and treated. The amount of sludge generated is significant, often 3 to 5 per cent of the total volume of water to be treated. The cost of treating and disposing of the sludge can impact the operating cost of a water treatment plant. The sedimentation basin may be equipped with mechanical cleaning devices that continually clean its bottom, or the basin can be periodically taken out of service and cleaned manually.

==== Floc blanket clarifiers ====
A subcategory of sedimentation is the removal of particulates by entrapment in a layer of suspended floc as the water is forced upward. The major advantage of floc blanket clarifiers is that they occupy a smaller footprint than conventional sedimentation. The disadvantages are that particle removal efficiency can be highly variable depending on changes in influent water quality and influent water flow rate.

=== Dissolved air flotation ===
When particles to be removed do not settle out of solution easily, dissolved air flotation (DAF) is often used. After coagulation and flocculation processes, water flows to DAF tanks where air diffusers on the tank bottom create fine bubbles that attach to the floc resulting in a floating mass of concentrated floc. The floating floc blanket is removed from the surface and clarified water is withdrawn from the bottom of the DAF tank. Water supplies that are particularly vulnerable to unicellular algae blooms and supplies with low turbidity and high colour often employ DAF.

=== Filtration ===
After separating most floc, the water is filtered as the final step to remove remaining suspended particles and unsettled floc.

==== Rapid sand filters ====
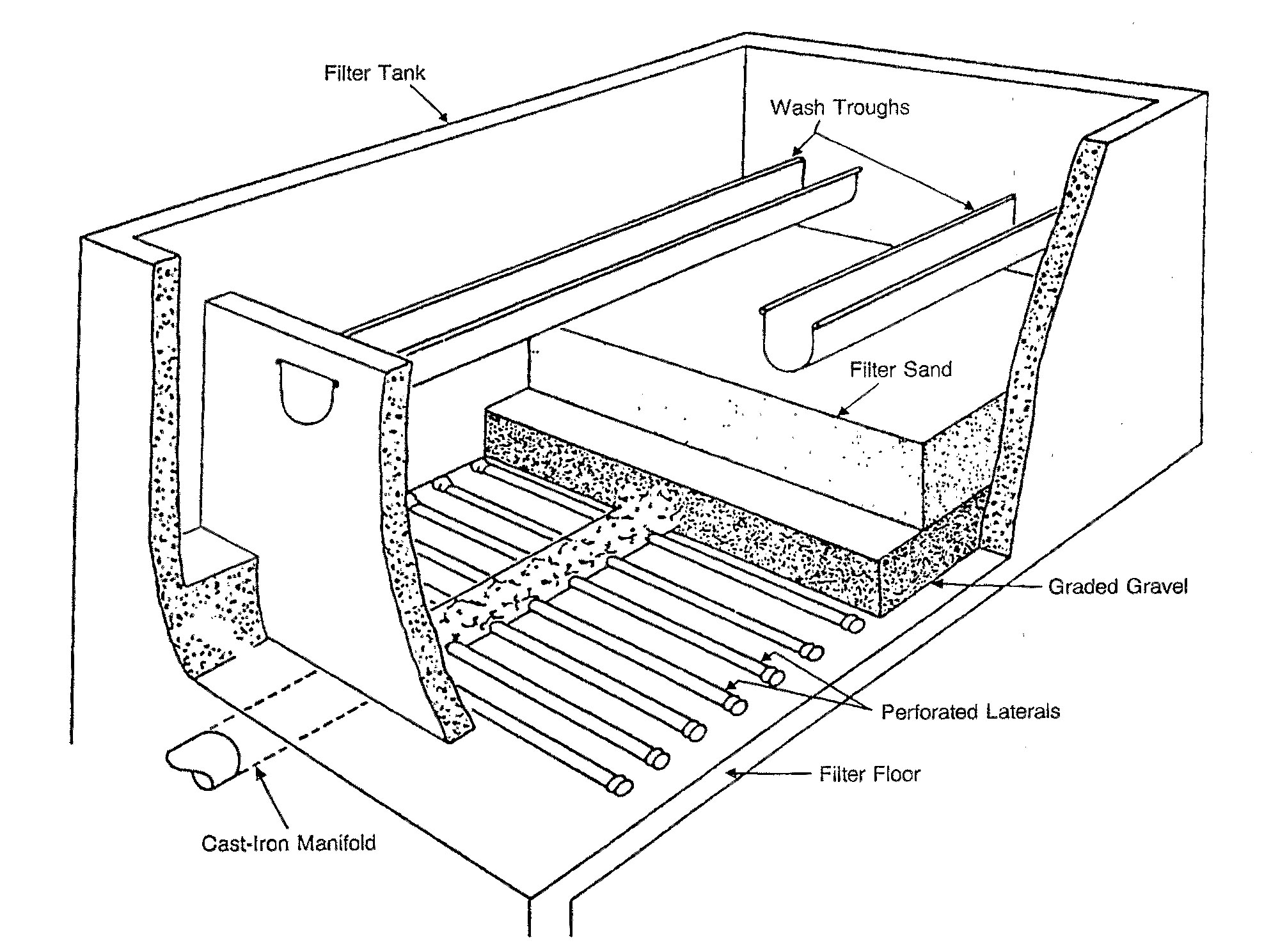
Cutaway view of a typical rapid sand filter

The most common type of filter is a rapid sand filter. Water moves vertically downward through sand which often has a layer of activated carbon or anthracite coal above the sand. The top layer removes organic compounds, which contribute to taste and odour. The space between sand particles is larger than the smallest suspended particles, so simple filtration is not enough. Most particles pass through surface layers but are trapped in pore spaces or adhere to sand particles. Effective filtration extends into the depth of the filter. This property of the filter is key to its operation: if the top layer of sand were to block all the particles, the filter would quickly clog.

A demo of backwashing on the left filter column

To clean the filter, water is passed quickly upward through the filter, opposite the normal direction (called backflushing or backwashing) to remove embedded or unwanted particles. Prior to this step, compressed air may be blown up through the bottom of the filter to break up the compacted filter media to aid the backwashing process; this is known as air scouring. This contaminated water can be disposed of, along with the sludge from the sedimentation basin, or it can be recycled by mixing with the raw water entering the plant although this is often considered poor practice since it re-introduces an elevated concentration of bacteria into the raw water.

Some water treatment plants employ pressure filters. These work on the same principle as rapid gravity filters, differing in that the filter medium is enclosed in a steel vessel and the water is forced through it under pressure.

Advantages:

- Filters out much smaller particles than paper and sand filters can.
- Filters out virtually all particles larger than their specified pore sizes.
- They are quite thin and so liquids flow through them fairly rapidly.
- They are reasonably strong and so can withstand pressure differences across them of typically 2–5 atmospheres.
- They can be cleaned (back flushed) and reused.

==== Slow sand filters ====
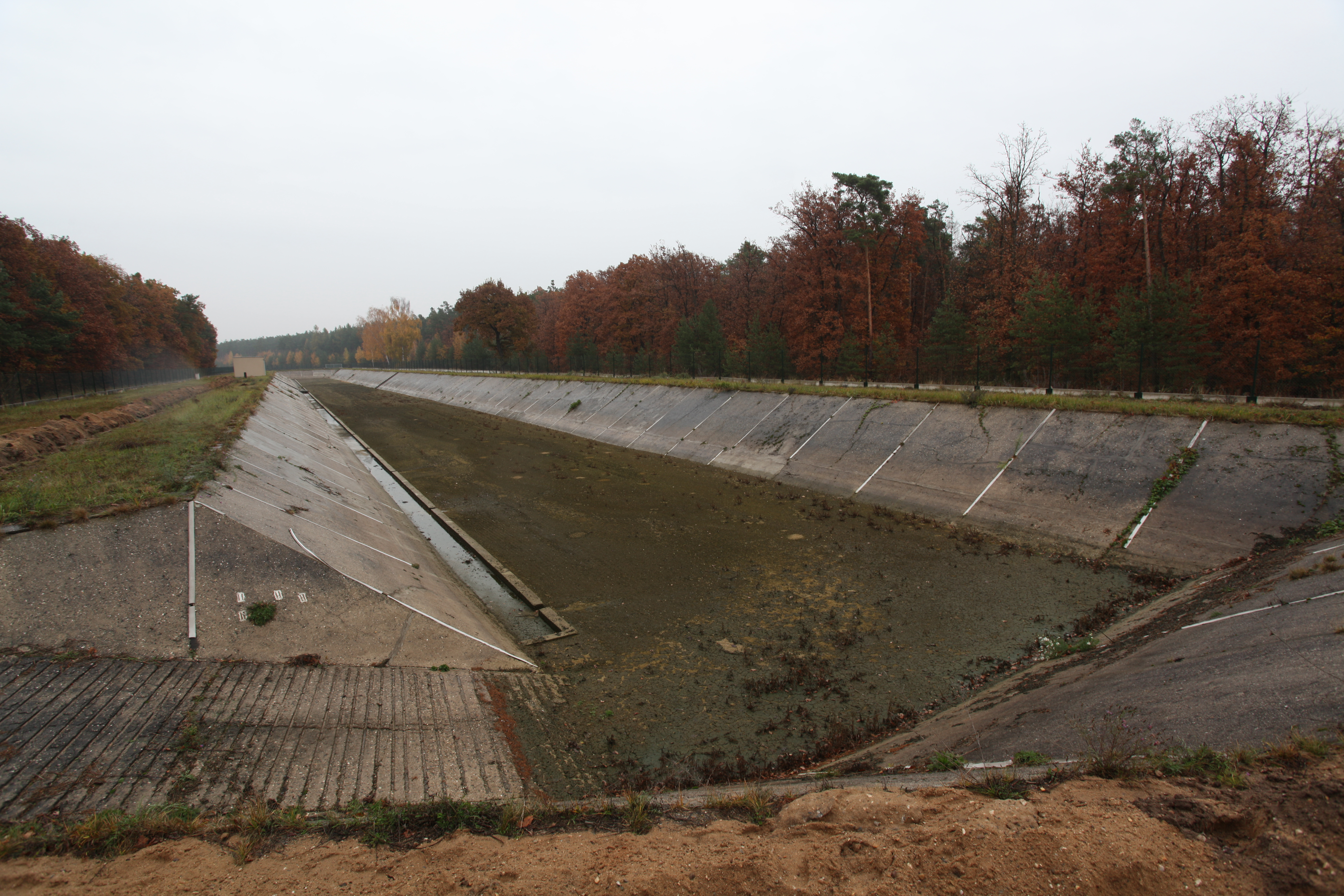
Slow "artificial" filtration (a variation of bank filtration) into the ground at the Water purification plant Káraný, Czech Republic.

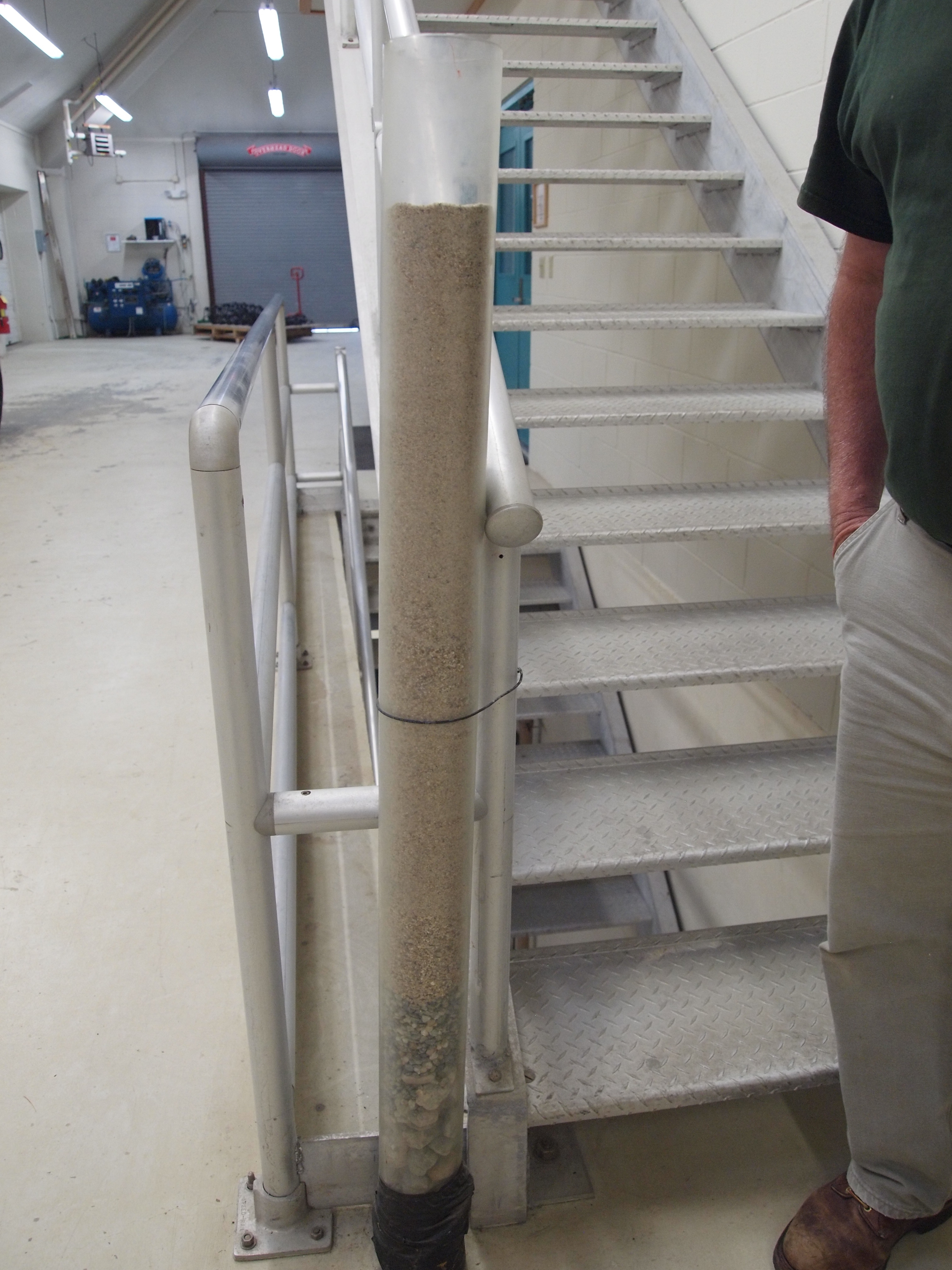
A profile of layers of gravel, sand and fine sand used in a slow sand filter plant.

Slow sand filters may be used where there is sufficient land and space, as the water flows very slowly through the filters. These filters rely on biological treatment processes for their action rather than physical filtration. They are carefully constructed using graded layers of sand, with the coarsest sand, along with some gravel, at the bottom and the finest sand at the top. Drains at the base convey treated water away for disinfection. Filtration depends on the development of a thin biological layer, called the zoogleal layer or Schmutzdecke, on the surface of the filter.

An effective slow sand filter may remain in service for many weeks or even months, if the pretreatment is well designed, and produces water with a very low available nutrient level which physical methods of treatment rarely achieve. Very low nutrient levels allow water to be safely sent through distribution systems with very low disinfectant levels, thereby reducing consumer irritation over offensive levels of chlorine and chlorine by-products. Slow sand filters are not backwashed; they are maintained by having the top layer of sand scraped off when the flow is eventually obstructed by biological growth.

==== Bank filtration ====
In bank filtration, natural sediments in a riverbank are used to provide the first stage of contaminant filtration. While typically not clean enough to be used directly for drinking water, the water gained from the associated extraction wells is much less problematic than river water taken directly from the river.

==== Membrane filtration ====
Membrane filters are widely used for filtering both drinking water and sewage. For drinking water, membrane filters can remove virtually all particles larger than 0.2 μm—including Giardia and Cryptosporidium. Membrane filters are an effective form of tertiary treatment when it is desired to reuse the water for industry, for limited domestic purposes, or before discharging the water into a river that is used by towns further downstream. They are widely used in industry, particularly for beverage preparation (including bottled water). However no filtration can remove substances that are actually dissolved in the water such as phosphates, nitrates and heavy metal ions.

=== Removal of ions and other dissolved substances ===
Ultrafiltration membranes use polymer membranes with chemically formed microscopic pores that can be used to filter out dissolved substances avoiding the use of coagulants. The type of membrane media determines how much pressure is needed to drive the water through and what sizes of micro-organisms can be filtered out.

Ion exchange: Ion-exchange systems use ion-exchange resin- or zeolite-packed columns to replace unwanted ions. The most common case is water softening consisting of removal of Ca^{2+} and Mg^{2+} ions replacing them with benign (soap friendly) Na^{+} or K^{+} ions. Ion-exchange resins are also used to remove toxic ions such as nitrite, lead, mercury, arsenic and many others.

Precipitative softening: Water rich in hardness (calcium and magnesium ions) is treated with lime (calcium oxide) and/or soda-ash (sodium carbonate) to precipitate calcium carbonate out of solution utilising the common-ion effect.

Electrodeionization: Water is passed between a positive electrode and a negative electrode. Ion-exchange membranes allow only positive ions to migrate from the treated water toward the negative electrode and only negative ions toward the positive electrode. High purity deionised water is produced continuously, similar to ion-exchange treatment. Complete removal of ions from water is possible if the right conditions are met. The water is normally pre-treated with a reverse osmosis unit to remove non-ionic organic contaminants, and with gas transfer membranes to remove carbon dioxide. A water recovery of 99% is possible if the concentrate stream is fed to the RO inlet.

=== Disinfection ===
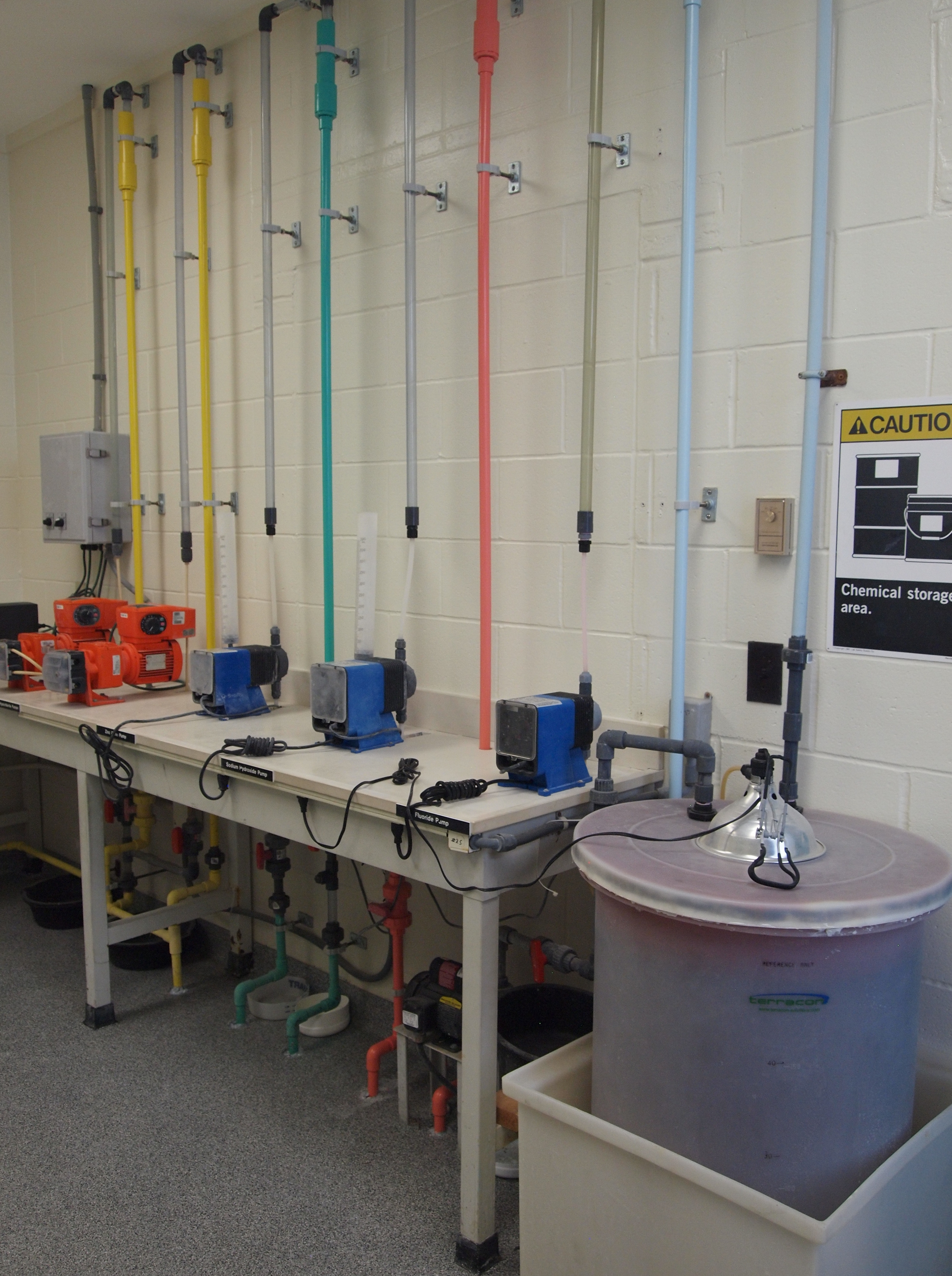
Pumps used to add required amounts of chemicals to the clear water at a water purification plant before distribution. From left to right: sodium hypochlorite for disinfection, zinc orthophosphate as a corrosion inhibitor, sodium hydroxide for pH adjustment, and fluoride for tooth decay prevention.

Disinfection is accomplished both by filtering out harmful micro-organisms and by adding disinfectant chemicals. Water is disinfected to kill any pathogens which pass through the filters and to provide a residual dose of disinfectant to kill or inactivate potentially harmful micro-organisms in the storage and distribution systems.

Possible pathogens include viruses, bacteria, including Salmonella, Cholera, Campylobacter and Shigella, and protozoa, including Giardia lamblia and other cryptosporidia. After the introduction of any chemical disinfecting agent, the water is usually held in temporary storage – often called a contact tank or clear well – to allow the disinfecting action to complete.

==== Chlorine disinfection ====
The most common disinfection method involves some form of chlorine or its compounds such as chloramine or chlorine dioxide. Chlorine is a strong oxidant that rapidly kills many harmful micro-organisms. Because chlorine is a toxic gas, there is a danger of a release associated with its use. This problem is avoided by the use of sodium hypochlorite, which is a relatively inexpensive solution used in household bleach that releases free chlorine when dissolved in water. Chlorine solutions can be generated on site by electrolyzing common salt solutions. A solid form, calcium hypochlorite, releases chlorine on contact with water. Handling the solid, however, requires more routine human contact through opening bags and pouring than the use of gas cylinders or bleach, which are more easily automated. The generation of liquid sodium hypochlorite is inexpensive and also safer than the use of gas or solid chlorine. Chlorine levels up to 4 milligrams per litre (4 parts per million) are considered safe in drinking water.

All forms of chlorine are widely used, despite their respective drawbacks. One drawback is that chlorine from any source reacts with natural organic compounds in the water to form potentially harmful chemical by-products. These by-products, trihalomethanes (THMs) and haloacetic acids (HAAs), are both carcinogenic in large quantities and are regulated by the United States Environmental Protection Agency (EPA) and the Drinking Water Inspectorate in the UK. The formation of THMs and haloacetic acids may be minimised by the effective removal of as many organics from the water as possible prior to chlorine addition. Although chlorine is effective in killing bacteria, it has limited effectiveness against pathogenic protozoa that form cysts in water such as Giardia lamblia and Cryptosporidium.

==== Chlorine dioxide disinfection ====
Chlorine dioxide is a faster-acting disinfectant than elemental chlorine. It is relatively rarely used because in some circumstances it may create excessive amounts of chlorite, which is a by-product regulated to low allowable levels in the United States. Chlorine dioxide can be supplied as an aqueous solution and added to water to avoid gas handling problems; chlorine dioxide gas accumulations may spontaneously detonate.

==== Chloramination ====
The use of chloramine is becoming more common as a disinfectant. Although chloramine is not as strong an oxidant, it provides a longer-lasting residual than free chlorine because of its lower redox potential compared to free chlorine. It also does not readily form THMs or haloacetic acids (disinfection byproducts).

It is possible to convert chlorine to chloramine by adding ammonia to the water after adding chlorine. The chlorine and ammonia react to form chloramine. Water distribution systems disinfected with chloramines may experience nitrification, as ammonia is a nutrient for bacterial growth, with nitrates being generated as a by-product.

==== Ozone disinfection ====
Ozone is an unstable molecule which readily gives up one atom of oxygen providing a powerful oxidising agent which is toxic to most waterborne organisms. It is a very strong, broad spectrum disinfectant that is widely used in Europe and in a few municipalities in the United States and Canada. Ozone disinfection, or ozonation, is an effective method to inactivate harmful protozoa that form cysts. It also works well against almost all other pathogens. Ozone is made by passing oxygen through ultraviolet light or a "cold" electrical discharge. To use ozone as a disinfectant, it must be created on-site and added to the water by bubble contact. Some of the advantages of ozone include the production of fewer dangerous by-products and the absence of taste and odour problems (in comparison to chlorination). No residual ozone is left in the water. In the absence of a residual disinfectant in the water, chlorine or chloramine may be added throughout a distribution system to remove any potential pathogens in the distribution piping.

Ozone has been used in drinking water plants since 1906 where the first industrial ozonation plant was built in Nice, France. The U.S. Food and Drug Administration has accepted ozone as being safe; and it is applied as an anti-microbiological agent for the treatment, storage, and processing of foods. However, although fewer by-products are formed by ozonation, it has been discovered that ozone reacts with bromide ions in water to produce concentrations of the suspected carcinogen bromate. Bromide can be found in fresh water supplies in sufficient concentrations to produce (after ozonation) more than 10 parts per billion (ppb) of bromate—the maximum contaminant level established by the USEPA. Ozone disinfection is also energy intensive.

==== Ultraviolet disinfection ====
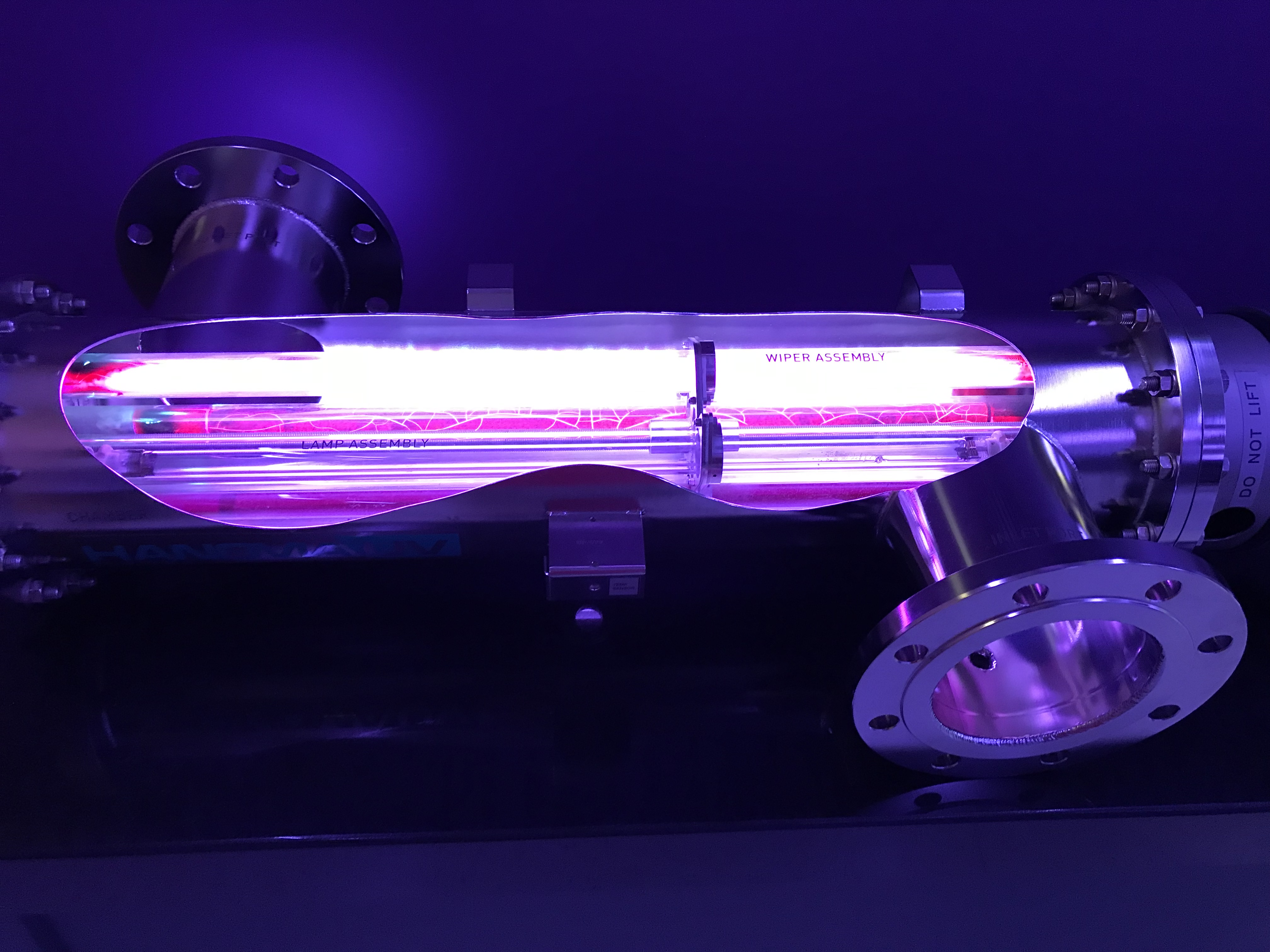
Cutaway model of UV disinfection unit used in water treatment plants.

Ultraviolet light (UV) is very effective at inactivating cysts, in low turbidity water. UV light's disinfection effectiveness decreases as turbidity increases, a result of the absorption, scattering, and shadowing caused by the suspended solids. The main disadvantage to the use of UV radiation is that, like ozone treatment, it leaves no residual disinfectant in the water; therefore, it is sometimes necessary to add a residual disinfectant after the primary disinfection process. This is often done through the addition of chloramines, discussed above as a primary disinfectant. When used in this manner, chloramines provide an effective residual disinfectant with very few of the negative effects of chlorination.

==== Solar disinfection ====
Over 2 million people in 28 developing countries use solar disinfection for daily drinking water treatment.

==== Ionizing radiation ====
Like UV, ionizing radiation (X-rays, gamma rays, and electron beams) has been used to sterilise water.

==== Bromination and iodinisation ====
Bromine and iodine can also be used as disinfectants. However, chlorine in water is over three times more effective as a disinfectant against Escherichia coli than an equivalent concentration of bromine, and over six times more effective than an equivalent concentration of iodine. Iodine is commonly used for portable water purification, and bromine is common as a swimming pool disinfectant.

=== Portable water purification ===
Portable water purification devices and methods are available for disinfection and treatment in emergencies or in remote locations. Disinfection is the primary goal, since aesthetic considerations such as taste, odour, appearance, and trace chemical contamination do not affect the short-term safety of drinking water.

=== Additional treatment options ===
Water fluoridation
In many areas fluoride is added to water with the goal of preventing tooth decay. Fluoride is usually added after the disinfection process. In the U.S., fluoridation is usually accomplished by the addition of hexafluorosilicic acid, which decomposes in water, yielding fluoride ions.
Water conditioning
This is a method of reducing the effects of hard water. In water systems subject to heating hardness salts can be deposited as the decomposition of bicarbonate ions creates carbonate ions that precipitate out of solution. Water with high concentrations of hardness salts can be treated with soda ash (sodium carbonate) which precipitates out the excess salts, through the common-ion effect, producing calcium carbonate of very high purity. The precipitated calcium carbonate is traditionally sold to the manufacturers of toothpaste. Several other methods of industrial and residential water treatment are claimed (without general scientific acceptance) to include the use of magnetic and/or electrical fields reducing the effects of hard water.
Plumbosolvency reduction
In areas with naturally acidic waters of low conductivity (i.e. surface rainfall in upland mountains of igneous rocks), the water may be capable of dissolving lead from any lead pipes that it is carried in. The addition of small quantities of phosphate ion and increasing the pH slightly both assist in greatly reducing plumbo-solvency by creating insoluble lead salts on the inner surfaces of the pipes.
Radium removal
Some groundwater sources contain radium, a radioactive chemical element. Typical sources include many groundwater sources north of the Illinois River in Illinois, United States of America. Radium can be removed by ion exchange, or by water conditioning. The back flush or sludge that is produced is, however, a low-level radioactive waste.
Fluoride removal
Although fluoride is added to water in many areas, some areas of the world have excessive levels of natural fluoride in the source water. Excessive levels can be toxic or cause undesirable cosmetic effects such as staining of teeth. Methods of reducing fluoride levels is through treatment with activated alumina and bone char filter media.

== Other water purification techniques ==
Other popular methods for purifying water, especially for local private supplies are listed below. In some countries some of these methods are used for large scale municipal supplies. Particularly important are distillation (desalination of seawater) and reverse osmosis.

=== Thermal ===
Bringing water to its boiling point (about 100 °C or 212 °F at sea level), is the oldest and most effective method of sterilising water since it eliminates most microbes causing intestinal disease, but it cannot remove chemical toxins or impurities. For human health, complete sterilisation of water is not required, since heat resistant microbes do not affect intestines. The traditional advice of boiling water for ten minutes is mainly for additional safety, since microbes start expiring at temperatures greater than 60 °C (140 °F). Though the boiling point decreases with increasing altitude, it is not enough to affect disinfection. In areas where the water is "hard" (that is, containing significant dissolved calcium salts), boiling decomposes the bicarbonate ions, resulting in partial precipitation as calcium carbonate. This is the "fur" that builds up on kettle elements, etc., in hard water areas. With the exception of calcium, boiling does not remove solutes of higher boiling point than water and in fact increases their concentration (due to some water being lost as vapour). Boiling does not leave a residual disinfectant in the water. Therefore, water that is boiled and then stored for any length of time may acquire new pathogens.

=== Adsorption ===
Granular activated carbon is a form of activated carbon with a high surface area. It adsorbs many compounds including many toxic compounds. Water passing through activated carbon is commonly used in municipal regions with organic contamination, taste or odors. Many household water filters and fish tanks use activated carbon filters to purify water. Household filters for drinking water sometimes contain silver as metallic silver nanoparticle. If water is held in the carbon block for longer periods, microorganisms can grow inside which results in fouling and contamination. Silver nanoparticles are excellent anti-bacterial material and can decompose toxic halo-organic compounds such as pesticides into non-toxic organic products. Filtered water must be used soon after it is filtered, as the low amount of remaining microbes may proliferate over time. In general, these home filters remove over 90% of the chlorine in a glass of treated water. These filters must be periodically replaced otherwise the bacterial content of the water may actually increase due to the growth of bacteria within the filter unit.

=== Distillation ===
Distillation involves boiling water to produce water vapour. The vapour contacts a cool surface where it condenses as a liquid. Because the solutes are not normally vaporised, they remain in the boiling solution. Even distillation does not completely purify water, because of contaminants with similar boiling points and droplets of unvapourised liquid carried with the steam. However, 99.9% pure water can be obtained by distillation.

Direct contact membrane distillation (DCMD) passes heated seawater along the surface of a hydrophobic polymer membrane. Evaporated water passes from the hot side through pores in the membrane forming a stream of cold pure water on the other side. The difference in vapour pressure between the hot and cold side helps to push water molecules through.

=== Reverse osmosis ===
Reverse osmosis involves mechanical pressure applied to force water through a semi-permeable membrane. Contaminants are left on the other side of the membrane. Reverse osmosis is theoretically the most thorough method of large scale water purification available, although perfect semi-permeable membranes are difficult to create. Unless membranes are well-maintained, algae and other life forms can colonise the membranes.

=== Crystallization ===
Carbon dioxide or other low molecular weight gas can be mixed with contaminated water at high pressure and low temperature to exothermically form gas hydrate crystals. Hydrate may be separated by centrifuge or sedimentation. Water can be released from the hydrate crystals by heating.

=== In situ oxidation ===
In situ chemical oxidation (ISCO) is an advanced oxidation process. It is used for soil and/or groundwater remediation to reduce the concentrations of targeted contaminants. ISCO is accomplished by injecting or otherwise introducing oxidizers into the contaminated medium (soil or groundwater) to destroy contaminants. It can be used to remediate a variety of organic compounds, including some that are resistant to natural degradation

=== Bioremediation ===
Bioremediation uses microorganisms to remove waste products from a contaminated area. Since 1991 bioremediation has been a suggested tactic to remove impurities such as alkanes, perchlorates, and metals. Bioremediation has seen success because perchlorates are highly soluble, making them difficult to remove. Example applications of Dechloromonas agitata strain CKB include field studies conducted in Maryland and the US Southwest.

=== Hydrogen peroxide ===
Hydrogen peroxide (H_{2}O_{2}) is a common disinfectant that can purify water. It is typically produced at chemical plants and transported to the contaminated water. An alternative approach employs a gold-palladium catalyst to synthesize H_{2}O_{2} from ambient hydrogen and oxygen atoms at the use site. The latter was reported to be faster and 10^{7} times more potent at killing Escherichia coli than commercial H_{2}O_{2}, and over 10^{8} times more effective than chlorine. The catalytic reaction also produces reactive oxygen species (ROS) that bind and degrade other compounds.

== Safety and controversies ==
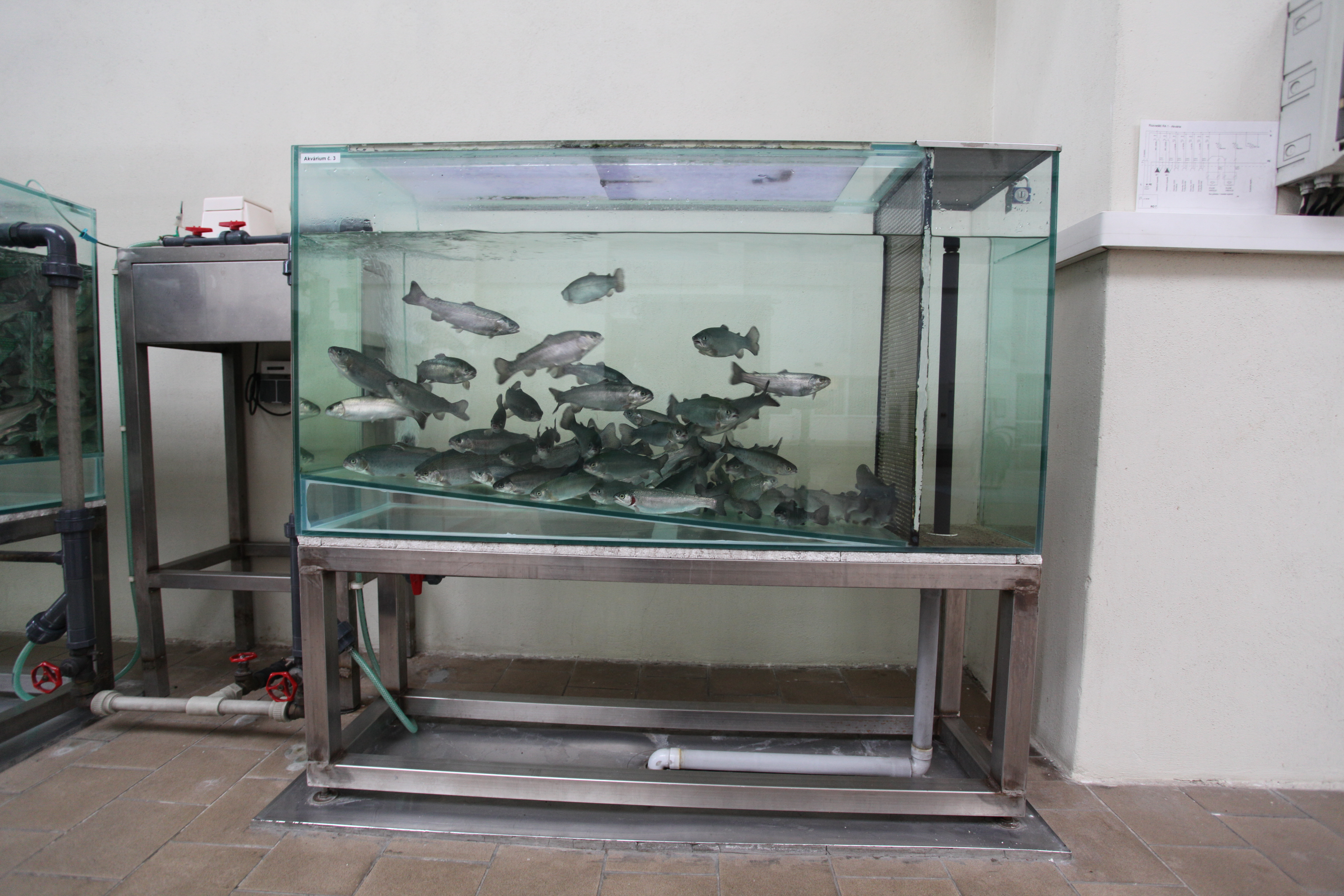
Rainbow trout (Oncorhynchus mykiss) are often used in water purification plants to detect acute water pollution.

Many municipalities have moved from using free chlorine, to chloramine as a disinfection agent. However, chloramine appears to be a corrosive agent in some water systems. Chloramine can dissolve the "protective" film inside older service lines, leading to the leaching of lead into residential spigots. This can result in harmful exposure, including elevated blood lead levels. Lead is a known neurotoxin. Adding orthophosphate as an anticorrosive agent has been effective in reducing lead levels in drinking water.

=== Demineralized water ===
Distillation removes all minerals from water, and the membrane methods of reverse osmosis and nanofiltration remove most to all minerals. This results in demineralised water which is not considered ideal drinking water. The World Health Organization has investigated the health effects of demineralised water since 1980. Experiments in humans found that demineralised water increased diuresis and the elimination of electrolytes, with decreased blood serum potassium concentration. Magnesium, calcium, and other minerals in water can help to protect against nutritional deficiency. Demineralized water may also increase the risk from toxic metals because it more readily leaches materials from piping like lead and cadmium, which is prevented by dissolved minerals such as calcium and magnesium. Low-mineral water has been implicated in specific cases of lead poisoning in infants, when lead from pipes leached at especially high rates into the water. Recommendations for magnesium have been put at a minimum of 10 mg/L with 20–30 mg/L optimum; for calcium a 20 mg/L minimum and a 40–80 mg/L optimum, and a total water hardness (adding magnesium and calcium) of 2 to 4 mmol/L. At water hardness above 5 mmol/L, higher incidence of gallstones, kidney stones, urinary stones, arthrosis, and arthropathies have been observed. Additionally, desalination processes can increase the risk of bacterial contamination.

Manufacturers of home water distillers claim the opposite—that minerals in water are the cause of many diseases, and that most beneficial minerals come from food, not water.

== History ==
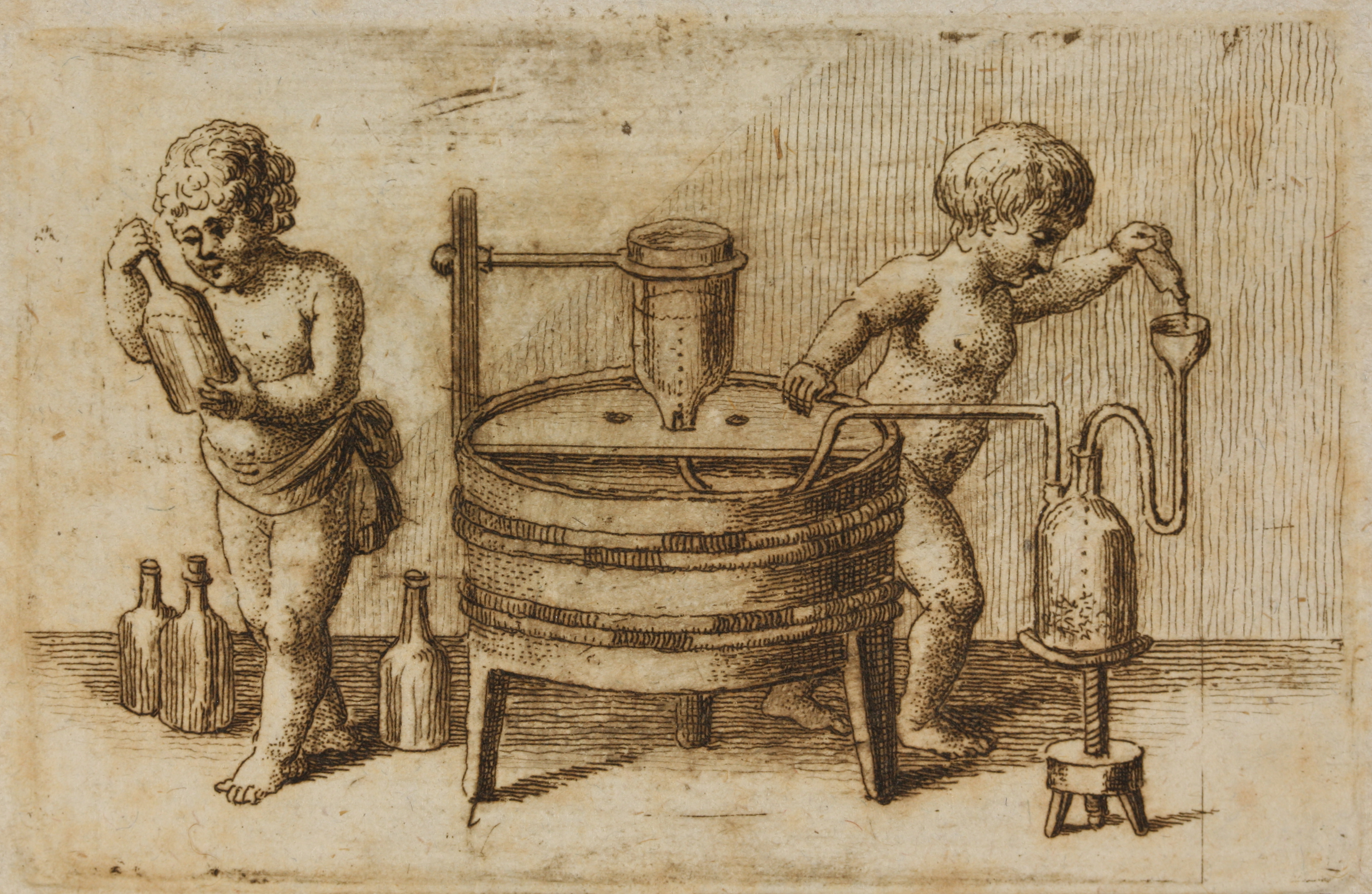
Drawing of an apparatus for studying the chemical analysis of mineral waters in a book from 1799.

The first experiments into water filtration were made in the 17th century. Sir Francis Bacon attempted to desalinate sea water by passing the flow through a sand filter. Although his experiment did not succeed, it marked the beginning of a new interest in the field. The fathers of microscopy, Antonie van Leeuwenhoek and Robert Hooke, used the newly invented microscope to observe for the first time small material particles that lay suspended in the water, laying the groundwork for the future understanding of waterborne pathogens.

=== Sand filter ===
Original map by John Snow showing the clusters of cholera cases in the London epidemic of 1854.

The first documented use of sand filters to purify the water supply dates to 1804, when the owner of a bleachery in Paisley, Scotland, John Gibb, installed an experimental filter, selling his unwanted surplus to the public. This method was refined in the following two decades by engineers working for private water companies, and it culminated in the first treated public water supply in the world, installed by engineer James Simpson for the Chelsea Waterworks Company in London in 1829. This installation provided filtered water for every resident of the area, and the network design was widely copied throughout the United Kingdom in the ensuing decades.

The practice of water treatment soon became mainstream and common, and the virtues of the system were made starkly apparent after the investigations of the physician John Snow during the 1854 Broad Street cholera outbreak. Snow was sceptical of the then-dominant miasma theory that stated that diseases were caused by noxious "bad airs". Although the germ theory of disease had not yet been developed, Snow's observations led him to discount the prevailing theory. His 1855 essay On the Mode of Communication of Cholera conclusively demonstrated the role of the water supply in spreading the cholera epidemic in Soho, with the use of a dot distribution map and statistical proof to illustrate the connection between the quality of the water source and cholera cases. His data convinced the local council to disable the water pump, which promptly ended the outbreak.

The Metropolis Water Act introduced the regulation of the water supply companies in London, including minimum standards of water quality for the first time. The Act "made provision for securing the supply to the Metropolis of pure and wholesome water", and required that all water be "effectually filtered" from 31 December 1855. This was followed up with legislation for the mandatory inspection of water quality, including comprehensive chemical analyses, in 1858. This legislation set a worldwide precedent for similar state public health interventions across Europe. The Metropolitan Commission of Sewers was formed at the same time, water filtration was adopted throughout the country, and new water intakes on the Thames were established above Teddington Lock. Automatic pressure filters, where the water is forced under pressure through the filtration system, were innovated in 1899 in England.

By the 1920s large municipal water systems installed rapid sand filters, which require smaller land areas compared to slow sand filters.

=== Water chlorination ===
John Snow was the first to successfully use chlorine to disinfect the water supply in Soho that had helped spread the cholera outbreak. William Soper also used chlorinated lime to treat the sewage produced by typhoid patients in 1879.

In a paper published in 1894, Moritz Traube formally proposed the addition of chloride of lime (calcium hypochlorite) to water to render it "germ-free". Two other investigators confirmed Traube's findings and published their papers in 1895. Early attempts at implementing water chlorination at a water treatment plant were made in 1893 in Hamburg, Germany and in 1897 the city of Maidstone, England was the first to have its entire water supply treated with chlorine.

Permanent water chlorination began in 1905, when a faulty slow sand filter and a contaminated water supply led to a serious typhoid fever epidemic in Lincoln, England. Alexander Cruickshank Houston used chlorination of the water to stem the epidemic. His installation fed a concentrated solution of chloride of lime to the water being treated. The chlorination of the water supply helped stop the epidemic and as a precaution, the chlorination was continued until 1911 when a new water supply was instituted.

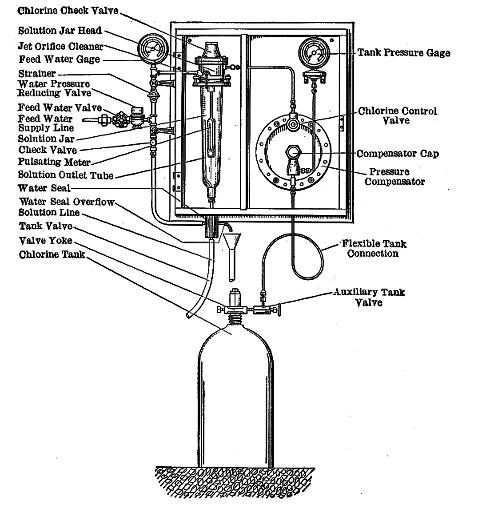
Manual-control chlorinator for the liquefaction of chlorine for water purification, early 20th century. From Chlorination of Water by Joseph Race, 1918.

The first continuous use of chlorine in the United States for disinfection took place in 1908 at Boonton Reservoir (on the Rockaway River), which served as the supply for Jersey City, New Jersey. Chlorination was achieved by controlled additions of dilute solutions of chloride of lime (calcium hypochlorite) at doses of 0.2 to 0.35 ppm. The treatment process was conceived by John L. Leal and the chlorination plant was designed by George Warren Fuller. Over the next few years, chlorine disinfection using chloride of lime were rapidly installed in drinking water systems around the world.

The technique of purification of drinking water by use of compressed liquefied chlorine gas was developed by a British officer in the Indian Medical Service, Vincent B. Nesfield, in 1903. According to his own account:

It occurred to me that chlorine gas might be found satisfactory ... if suitable means could be found for using it.... The next important question was how to render the gas portable. This might be accomplished in two ways: By liquefying it, and storing it in lead-lined iron vessels, having a jet with a very fine capillary canal, and fitted with a tap or a screw cap. The tap is turned on, and the cylinder placed in the amount of water required. The chlorine bubbles out, and in ten to fifteen minutes the water is absolutely safe. This method would be of use on a large scale, as for service water carts.

U.S. Army Major Carl Rogers Darnall, Professor of Chemistry at the Army Medical School, gave the first practical demonstration of this in 1910. Shortly thereafter, Major William J. L. Lyster of the Army Medical Department used a solution of calcium hypochlorite in a linen bag to treat water. For many decades, Lyster's method remained the standard for U.S. ground forces in the field and in camps, implemented in the form of the familiar Lyster Bag (also spelled Lister Bag). The bag was made of canvas and could hold 36 gallons of water. It was porous and held up by ropes, purifying water with the help of calcium hypochlorite solution. Each bag had a faucet attached, which was used to flush water for testing, as well as dispensing for use. This became the basis for present day systems of municipal water purification.

== Global ==
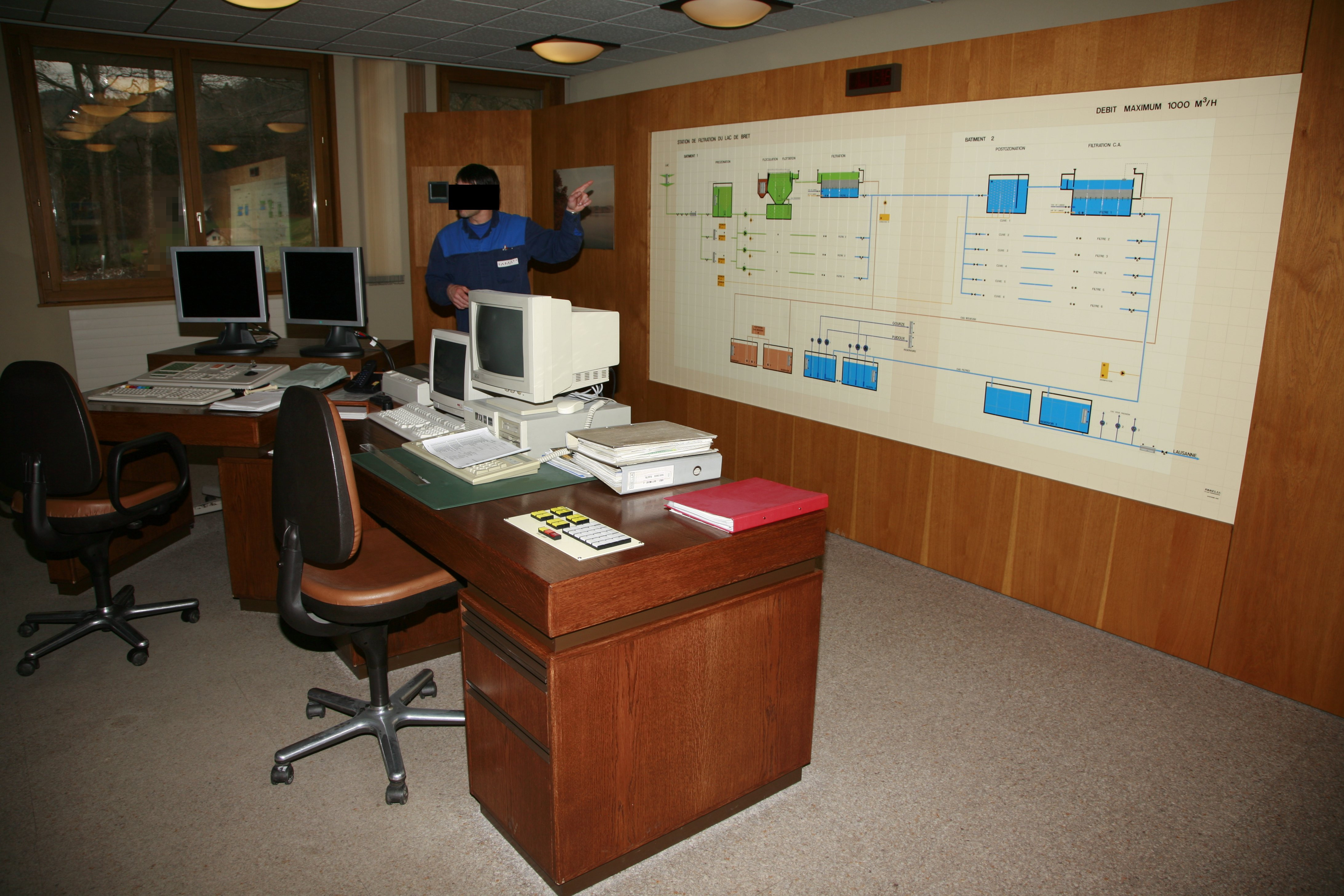
Control room and schematics of the water purification plant of Lac de Bret, Switzerland.

According to a 2007 World Health Organization report, 1.1 billion people lack access to an improved drinking water supply; 88% of the 4 billion annual cases of diarrheal disease are attributed to unsafe water and inadequate sanitation and hygiene, while 1.8 million people die from diarrhoeal disease each year. The WHO estimates that 94% of these diarrhoeal disease cases are preventable through modifications to the environment, including access to safe water. Simple techniques for treating water at home, such as chlorination, filters, and solar disinfection, and for storing it in safe containers could save a huge number of lives each year. Reducing deaths from waterborne diseases is a major public health goal in developing countries.

The global water purification market is worth 22 billion dollars. Home water filters and purifiers in India are common.

== See also ==
- History of water supply and sanitation
- List of water supply and sanitation by country
- Microfiltration
- Organisms involved in water purification
- Portable water purification
- Water softening
- Reclaimed water
- Water treatment
- Water for injection
