= Crematogaster auberti =

- Crematogaster auberti worker with brood

Scientific classification
- Kingdom: Animalia
- Phylum: Arthropoda
- Clade: Pancrustacea
- Class: Insecta
- Order: Hymenoptera
- Family: Formicidae
- Subfamily: Myrmicinae
- Genus: Crematogaster
- Species: C. auberti

Binomial name
- Crematogaster auberti Emery, 1869

Species of ant

Crematogaster auberti is a species of ant in tribe Crematogastrini. It was described by Emery in 1869.

== Taxonomy ==
Crematogaster auberti belongs to the subgenus Crematogaster (Crematogaster).

== Biology ==
This is an epigeal ant species that is mainly nocturnal. It nests in soil or under stones.
