= Gonaphodiopsis hypogea =

Scientific classification
- Kingdom: Animalia
- Phylum: Arthropoda
- Clade: Pancrustacea
- Class: Insecta
- Order: Coleoptera
- Suborder: Polyphaga
- Infraorder: Scarabaeiformia
- Family: Scarabaeidae
- Genus: Gonaphodiopsis
- Species: G. hypogea

Binomial name
- Gonaphodiopsis hypogea Dellacasa, Dellacasa & Gordon, 2012

Species of beetle

Gonaphodiopsis hypogea is a species of beetle of the family Scarabaeidae. It is found in Mexico (San Luis Potosí, Tamaulipas, Veracruz).

== Description ==
Adults reach a length of about 5–5.5 mm (0.20–0.22 in). They have an oblong, strongly convex, shiny, glabrous, dark chestnut-brown to blackish body, with the margin of the clypeus paler. The legs are dark brown and the club of the antennae is testaceous.

== Etymology ==
The species name is derived from Latin hypogeus (meaning hypogeal).

== Life history ==
Specimens have been collected in caves.
