= Clear well =

Component of a municipal drinking water purification system

A clear well (sometimes spelled as "clearwell") is a component of a municipal drinking water purification system. It refers to the final storage stage in the system, following the filtration and disinfection stages. The filtered water is held in a storage basin to allow the disinfectant to inactivate any remaining pathogens.

== See also ==
- Water well
