= Backwashing (water treatment) =

Pumping water backwards through a filter

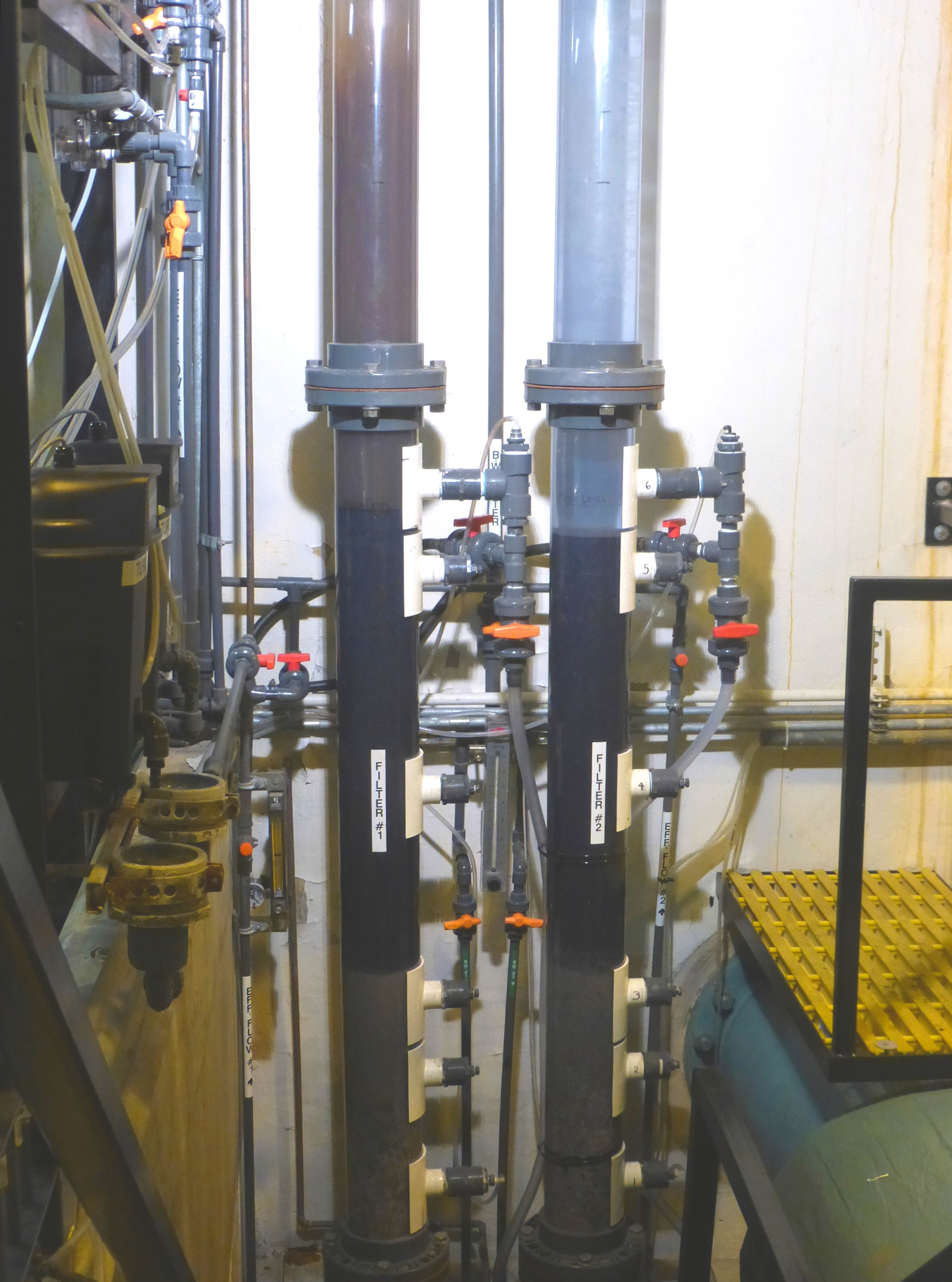
Backwashing cycle is run on the left filter of the test columns in a water filtration plant.

In terms of water treatment, including water purification and sewage treatment, backwashing refers to pumping water backwards through the filter's media, sometimes including intermittent use of compressed air during the process. Backwashing is a form of preventive maintenance so that the filter media can be reused. In water treatment plants, backwashing can be an automated process that is run by local programmable logic controllers (PLCs). The backwash cycle is triggered after a set time interval, when the filter effluent turbidity is greater than a treatment guideline or when the differential pressure (head loss) across the filter exceeds a set value.

== Overview ==
Water treatment filters that can be backwashed include rapid sand filters, water softening systems, pressure filters and granular activated carbon (GAC) filters. Diatomaceous earth filters are backwashed according to the proprietary arrangement of pumps, valves and filters associated with the filtration system. Slow sand filters and self-cleaning screen filters employ mechanisms other than backwashing to remove trapped particles. To keep water treatment filters functional, they have to be cleaned periodically to remove particulates. Ineffective backwashing is one of the main reasons that water treatment filters fail.

== Procedure ==
Backwashing demo on a test column

Backwashing of granular media filters involves several steps. First, the filter is taken offline and the water is drained to a level that is above the surface of the filter bed. Next, compressed air is pushed up through the filter material causing the filter bed to expand breaking up the compacted filter bed and forcing the accumulated particles into suspension. After the air scour cycle, clean backwash water is forced upwards through the filter bed continuing the filter bed expansion, and carrying the particles in suspension into backwash troughs suspended above the filter surface. In some applications, air and water streams are simultaneously pushed upwards through the granular media followed by a rinse water wash. Backwashing continues for a fixed time, or until the turbidity of the backwash water is below an established value. At the end of the backwash cycle, the upward flow of water is terminated and the filter bed settles by gravity into its initial configuration. Water to be filtered is then applied to the filter surface until the filter clogs and the backwash cycle needs to be repeated.

Some water treatment filters use surface wash systems that break up the heavily clogged, granular media surface layer. Surface wash systems are buried in the top of the filter media or are suspended above the filter media surface. John R. Baylis developed a fixed grid system which consisted of pipes with nozzles that injected jets of water into the filter material during expansion. Rotating arms use jets of water to break up the clogged filter surface and to rotate a movable arm through the filter material. A surface wash step in a backwash cycle usually takes place at the beginning of the filter bed cleaning process.

== Treatment ==
Spent backwash water is either discharged without treatment to a sanitary sewer system or is treated and recycled within the plant. Historically, backwash water was discharged directly to surface water supplies; however, direct discharge is now highly regulated through NPDES discharge permits and is often discouraged. Used backwash water contains high concentrations of particulate material. Typical treatment processes include coagulation, flocculation and sedimentation. High molecular weight synthetic organic polymers are sometimes added to facilitate the formation of settleable floc. Failure of a backwash treatment process and reintroduction of the resulting poor quality water into the main water purification plant flow stream can cause overall process upsets, and result in the production of poor quality treated drinking water.

== Recycling ==
As a water conservation measure, many water purification plants recycle filter backwash water and other product streams from sludge treatment processes back to the beginning of the plant. On June 8, 2001, the USEPA released a final regulation governing acceptable practices for recycling backwash water. The purpose of the regulation was to improve the control of microbial contaminants such as Cryptosporidium, by reducing the potential for recycled product streams to upset the removal efficiency of the main treatment processes. The regulation requires that spent filter backwash water be recycled to the front of the treatment plant so that all available particle removal treatment processes can be employed to remove the microbial and particulate material from the backwash water.

== See also ==
- Boil-water advisory
