= Lamella clarifier =

Type of settler designed to remove particulates from liquids

A lamella clarifier or inclined plate settler (IPS) is a type of clarifier designed to remove particulates from liquids.

== Range of applications ==
Lamella clarifiers can be used in a range of industries, including mining and metal finishing, as well as to treat groundwater, industrial process water and backwash from sand filters. Lamella clarifiers are ideal for applications where the solids loading is variable and the solids sizing is fine. They are more common than conventional clarifiers at many industrial sites, due to their smaller footprint.

One specific application is pre-treatment for effluent entering membrane filters. Lamella clarifiers are considered one of the best options for pre-treatment ahead of ultrafiltration. Their all-steel design minimizes the chances that part of the inclined plate will chip off and be carried over into the membrane, especially compared to tube settlers, which are made of plastic. Further, lamella clarifiers may maintain the required water quality to the membrane with or without the use of chemicals. This is a cost-saving measure, both in purchasing chemicals and limiting damage to the membrane, as membranes do not work well with the large particles contained in flocculants and coagulants.

Lamella clarifiers are also used in the municipal wastewater treatment processes. The most common wastewater application for lamella clarifiers is as part of the tertiary treatment stage. Lamella clarifiers can be integrated into the treatment process or stand-alone units can be used to increase the flow through existing water treatment plants. One option for integrating lamella clarifiers into existing plants is for conventional or sludge blanket clarifiers to be upgraded by attaching a bundle of inclined plates or tubes before the overflow in the so-called "clear water zone". This can increase the settling area by two-fold resulting in a decrease in the solids loading in the overflow.

== Advantages and limitations ==
The main advantage of lamella clarifiers over other clarifying systems is the large effective settling area caused by the use of inclined plates, which improves the operating conditions of the clarifiers in a number of ways. The unit is more compact usually requiring only 65-80 % of the area of clarifiers operating without inclined plates. Therefore, where site footprint constraints are of concern a lamella clarifier system is preferred. The reduced required area allows the possibility for the clarifiers to be located and operated inside, reducing some of the common problems of algae growth, clogging due to blowing debris accumulation and odour control, that occur when the machinery is outdoors. Operation within an enclosed space also allows for a better control of operating temperature and pressure conditions. The inclined plates mean the clarifier can operate with overflow rates 2 to 4 times that of traditional clarifiers which allow a greater influent flow rate and thus a more time efficient clarification process. Lamella clarifiers also offer a simple design without requiring the use of chemicals. They are therefore able to act as pre-treatment for delicate membrane processes. Where necessary flocculants may be added to promote efficiency.

Lamella clarifier performance may be improved by the addition of flocculants and coagulants. These chemicals optimize the settling process and cause a higher purity of overflow water by ensuring all smaller solids are settled into the sludge underflow.

A further advantage of the lamella clarifier is its distinct absence of mechanical, moving parts. The system therefore requires no energy input except for the influent pump and has a much lower propensity for mechanical failure than other clarifiers. This advantage extends to safety considerations when operating the plant. The absence of mechanical results in a safer working environment, with less possibility for injury.

Whilst the lamella clarifier has overcome many difficulties encountered by the use of more traditional clarifiers, there are still some disadvantages involved with the configuration and running of the equipment. Lamella clarifiers are unable to treat most raw feed mixtures, which require some pre-treatment to remove materials that could decrease separation efficiency. The feed requires initial processing in advanced fine screening and grit and grease removal to ensure the influent mixture is of an appropriate composition.

The layout of the clarifier creates extra turbulence as the water turns a corner from the feed to the inclined plates. This area of increased turbulence coincides with the sludge collection point and the flowing water can cause some re suspension of solids, whilst simultaneously diluting the sludge. This results in the need for further treatment to remove the excess moisture from the sludge. Clarifier inlets and discharge must be designed to distribute flow evenly.

Regular maintenance is required as sludge flows down the inclined plates leaving them dirty. Regular cleaning helps prevent uneven flow distribution. Additionally, poorly maintained plates can cause uneven flow distribution and sacrifice the efficiency of the process. The closely packed plates make the cleaning difficult. However, removable and independently supported lamellar plates can be installed.

Commercially available lamella clarifiers require different concrete basin geometry and structural support to conventional clarifications system widely used in industry, thus increasing the cost of installing a new (lamellar) clarification system.

== Available designs ==
Typical lamella clarifier design consists of a series of inclined plates inside a vessel, see first figure. The untreated feed water stream enters from the top of the vessel and flows down a feed channel underneath the inclined plates. Water then flows up inside the clarifier between the inclined plates. During this time solids settle onto the plates and eventually fall to the bottom of the vessel. The route a particle takes will be dependent upon the flow rate of the suspension and the settling rate of the particle and can be seen in the second figure. At the bottom of the vessel a hopper or funnel collects these particles as sludge. Sludge may be continuously or intermittently discharged. Above the inclined plates all particles have settled and clarified water is produced which is drawn off into an outlet channel. The clarified water exits the system in an outlet stream.

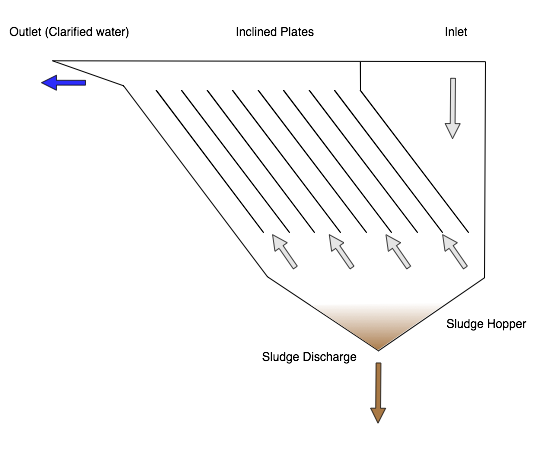
Lamella clarifier schematic in a piping and instrumentation diagram (P&ID).

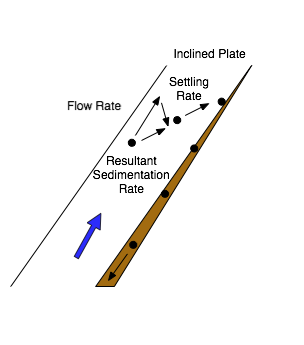
Particle settling behaviour (lamella clarifier).

There are a number of proprietary lamella clarifier designs. Inclined plates may be based on circular, hexagonal or rectangular tubes. Some possible design characteristics include:

- Tube or plate spacing of 50 mm
- Tube or plate length 1–2 m
- Plate pitches between 45° and 70° allow for self-cleaning, lower pitches require backwash
- Minimum plate pitch 7°
- Typical loading rates are 5 to 10 m/h

== Main process characteristics ==
Lamella clarifiers can handle a maximum feed water concentration of 10000 mg/L of grease and 3000 mg/L of solids. Expected separation efficiencies for a typical unit are:

- 90-99% removal of free oils and greases under standard operation conditions.
- 20-40% removal of emulsified oils and greases with no chemical amendment.
- 50-99% removal with the addition of chemical agent(s).
- Treated water has a turbidity of around 1-2 NTU.

Initial investment required for a typical lamella clarifier varies from US$750 to US$2500 per cubic meter of water to be treated, depending on the design of the clarifier.

The surface loading rate (also known as surface overflow rate or surface settling rate) for a lamella clarifier falls between 10 and 25 m/h. For these settling rates, the retention time in the clarifier is low, at around 20 minutes or less, with operating capacities tending to range from 1–3 m^{3}/hour/m^{2} (of projected area).

== Assessment of characteristics ==
Separation of solids is described by sedimentation effectiveness, η. Which is dependent on concentration, flow rate, particle size distribution, flow patterns and plate packing and is defined by the following equation.

η = (c_{1}-c_{2})/c_{2}

where c_{1} is inlet concentration and c_{2} outlet concentration.

Inclined angle of plates allows for increased loading rate/throughput and decreased retention time relative to conventional clarifiers. Increase in the loading rate of 2-3 times the conventional clarifier (of the same size).

The total surface area required for settling can be calculated for a lamella plate with N plates, each plate of width W, with plate pitch θ and tube spacing p.

Where,

A = W∙(Np+cos θ)

Table 1 presents the characteristics and operating ranges of different clarification units.

Clarification unit	Overflow rate (m^{3}/m^{2}/h)	Retention time (min)	Turbidity removal efficiency (%)
Lamella clarifier	5-12	60-120	90-95
Rectangular	1-2	120-180	90-95
Circular	1-3	60-120	90-95
Floc blanket	1-3	120-180	90-95
Sand ballasted	< 200	5-7	90-99
Sludge recirculation	< 120	10-16	90-99
Magnetite	< 30	15	90-99

Where overflow rate is a measure of the fluid loading capacity of the clarifier and is defined as, the influent flow rate divided by the horizontal area of the clarifier. The retention time is the average time that a particulate remains in the clarifier. The turbidity is a measure of cloudiness. Higher values for turbidity removal efficiency correspond to less particulates remaining in the clarified stream. The settling velocity of a particulate can also be determined by using Stokes' law.

== Design heuristics ==
- Rise rate: Rise rates can be between 0.8 and 4.88 m/h from different sources (Kucera, 2011).
- Plate loading: Loadings on plates should be limited to 2.9 m/h to ensure laminar flow is maintained between plates.
- Plate angle: The general consensus is that plates should be inclined at a 50-70° angle from the horizontal to allow for self-cleaning. This results in the projected plate area of the lamella clarifier taking up approximately 50% of the space of a conventional clarifier.
- Plate spacing: Typical spacing between plates is 50 mm, though plates can be spaced in the range of 50–80 mm apart, given that the particles > 50 mm in size have been removed in pre-treatment stages.
- Plate length: Depending on the scale of the system, total plate lengths can vary, however, the plate length should allow for the plates to rise 125 mm above the top water level, with 1.5 m of space left below the plates at the bottom of the clarifier for collection of sludge. Most plates have a length of 1–2 m.
- Plate materials: Plates should be made of stainless steel, with the exception of situations in which the system has been dosed with chlorine to prevent algal growth. In these circumstances, the plates may be plastic or plastic coated.
- Feed point: Feed should be introduced at least 20% above the base of the plate to prevent disturbance of the settling zones at the base of the plates.

== Post-treatment systems ==
Both the overflow stream and the underflow stream from a lamella clarifier will often require post-treatment. The underflow stream is often put through a dewatering process such as a thickener or a belt press filter to increase the density of slurry. This is an important post-treatment as the underflow slurry is often not able to be recycled back into the process. In such a case it often needs to be transported to a disposal plant, and the cost of this transport depends on the volume and weight of the slurry. Hence an efficient dewatering process can result in a substantial cost saving. Where the slurry can be recycled through the process it often needs to be dried, and dewatering again is an important step in this process.

The post-treatment required for the overflow stream depends both on the nature of the inlet stream and what the overflow will be used for. For example, if the fluid being put through the lamella clarifier comes from a heavy industrial plant it may require post-treatment to remove oil and grease especially if the effluent is going to be discharged to the environment. A separation process unit such as a coalescer is often used to physically trigger a separation of the water and the oils.

For the treatment of potable water the overflow from the lamella clarifier will require further treatment to remove organic molecules as well as disinfection to remove bacteria. It will also be passed through a series of polishing units to remove the odour and improve the colour of the water.

There is a tendency with lamella clarifiers for algae to grow on the inclined plates and this can be a problem especially if the overflow is being discharged to the environment or if the lamella clarifier is being utilized as pre-treatment for a membrane filtration unit. In either of these cases the overflow requires post-treatment such as an anthracite-sand filter to prevent the algae from spreading downstream of the lamella clarifier. As the inclined plates in the lamella clarifier are made of steel it is not recommended that chlorine be used to control the biological growth as it could accelerate the corrosion of the plates.

== New developments ==
One variation on the standard design of a lamella clarifier being developed is the way the effluent is collected at the top of the inclined plates. Rather than the effluent flowing over the top of the inclined plates to the outlet channel it flows through orifices at the top of the plates. This design allows for more consistent back pressure in the channels between the plates and hence a more consistent flow profile develops. Obviously this design only works for relatively clean effluent streams as the orifices would quickly become blocked with deposits which would severely reduce the efficiency of the unit. Another new design includes an adjustable upper portion of the vessel so that vessel height can be changed. This height adjustment is relative to a deflector, which directs the inlet stream. This design intended to be used for decanting storm water.

Another design variation, which improves the efficiency of the separation unit is the way the effluent enters the lamella clarifier. Standard clarifier design has the effluent entering at the bottom of the inclined plates, colliding with the sludge sliding down the plates. This mixing region renders the bottom 20% of the inclined plates unusable for settling. By designing the lamella clarifier so that the effluent enters the inclined plates without interfering with the downward slurry flow the capacity of the lamella clarifier can be improved by 25%.
