= Gonaphodiopsis pachecoi =

Scientific classification
- Kingdom: Animalia
- Phylum: Arthropoda
- Clade: Pancrustacea
- Class: Insecta
- Order: Coleoptera
- Suborder: Polyphaga
- Infraorder: Scarabaeiformia
- Family: Scarabaeidae
- Genus: Gonaphodiopsis
- Species: G. pachecoi

Binomial name
- Gonaphodiopsis pachecoi Dellacasa, Dellacasa & Gordon, 2012

Species of beetle

Gonaphodiopsis pachecoi is a species of beetle of the family Scarabaeidae. It is found in Mexico (Chiapas).

== Description ==
Adults reach a length of about 5–5.5 mm (0.20–0.22 in). They have an oblong, strongly convex, shiny, glabrous, blackish body, with the margin of the clypeus and elytral suture reddish. The legs are dark brown and the club of the antennae is piceous.

== Etymology ==
The species is named in honour of Mexican scarabaeidologist Cutberto Pacheco.
