= Gonaphodiopsis teopiscaensis =

Scientific classification
- Kingdom: Animalia
- Phylum: Arthropoda
- Clade: Pancrustacea
- Class: Insecta
- Order: Coleoptera
- Suborder: Polyphaga
- Infraorder: Scarabaeiformia
- Family: Scarabaeidae
- Genus: Gonaphodiopsis
- Species: G. teopiscaensis

Binomial name
- Gonaphodiopsis teopiscaensis Dellacasa, Dellacasa & Gordon, 2012

Species of beetle

Gonaphodiopsis teopiscaensis is a species of beetle of the family Scarabaeidae. It is found in Mexico (Chiapas) and Guatemala.

== Description ==
Adults reach a length of about 4.5–5 mm (0.18–0.20 in). They have an oblong, strongly convex, shiny, glabrous, reddish-brown body, with the pronotum and disc of the elytra darker. The legs are reddish-brown and the club of the antennae is testaceous.

== Etymology ==
The species is named after the type locality, Teopisca (Chiapas, Mexico).
