= Gonaphodiopsis deloyai =

Scientific classification
- Kingdom: Animalia
- Phylum: Arthropoda
- Clade: Pancrustacea
- Class: Insecta
- Order: Coleoptera
- Suborder: Polyphaga
- Infraorder: Scarabaeiformia
- Family: Scarabaeidae
- Genus: Gonaphodiopsis
- Species: G. deloyai

Binomial name
- Gonaphodiopsis deloyai Dellacasa, Dellacasa & Gordon, 2012

Species of beetle

Gonaphodiopsis deloyai is a species of beetle of the family Scarabaeidae. It is found in Mexico (Hidalgo, Oaxaca, Puebla, San Luis Potosí, Tamaulipas, Veracruz).

== Description ==
Adults reach a length of about 4–4.5 mm (0.16–0.18 in). They have an oblong-elongate, convex, shiny, glabrous, reddish brown body. The pronotum and elytra are darker on the disc and the legs are dark brown. The club of the antennae is testaceous.

== Etymology ==
The species is named in honour of Mexican scarabaeidologist Aristeo Cuauhtémoc Deloya.
