= Slow sand filter =

Water purification device

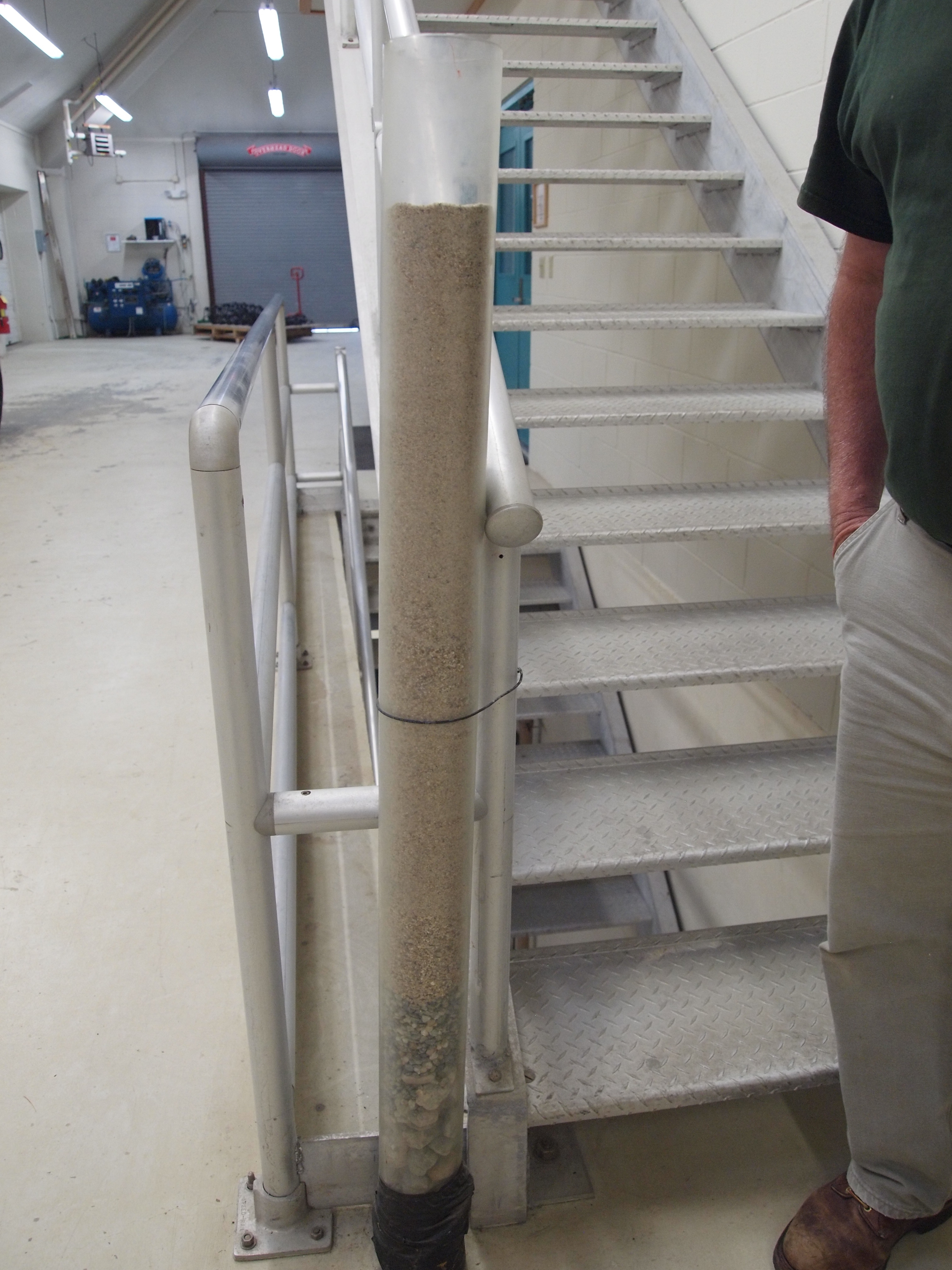
A cross-section of a slow sand filter displayed in a clear tube (left side of stairs)

Slow sand filters are a type of sand filter used in water purification for treating raw water to produce a potable product.

They are typically 1–2 m (3.3–6.6 ft) deep, can be rectangular or cylindrical in cross section and are used primarily to treat surface water. The length and breadth of the tanks are determined by the flow rate desired for the filters, which typically have a loading rate of 200–400 litres (0.20–0.40 m^{3}) per square metre per hour.

Slow sand filters differ from all other filters used to treat drinking water in that they work by using a complex biofilm that grows naturally on the surface of the sand. The sand itself does not perform any filtration function but simply acts as a substrate, unlike its counterparts for ultraviolet and pressurized treatments. Although they are often preferred technology in many developing countries because of their low energy requirements and robust performance, they are also used to treat water in some developed countries, such as the UK, where they are used to treat water supplied to London. Slow sand filters now are also being tested for pathogen control of nutrient solutions in hydroponic systems.

== History ==
Original map by John Snow showing the clusters of cholera cases in the London epidemic of 1854.

The first documented use of sand filters to purify the water supply dates to 1804, when the owner of a bleachery in Paisley, Scotland, John Gibb, installed an experimental filter created by engineer Robert Thom, selling his unwanted surplus to the public. This method was refined in the following two decades by engineers working for private water companies, and it culminated in the first treated public water supply in the world, installed by engineer James Simpson for the Chelsea Waterworks Company in London in 1829. This installation provided filtered water for every resident of the area, and the network design was widely copied throughout the United Kingdom in the ensuing decades.

The practice of water treatment soon became mainstream, and the virtues of the system were made starkly apparent after the investigations of the physician John Snow during the 1854 Broad Street cholera outbreak. Snow was sceptical of the then-dominant miasma theory that stated that diseases were caused by noxious "bad airs". Although the germ theory of disease had not yet been developed, Snow's observations led him to discount the prevailing theory. His 1855 essay On the Mode of Communication of Cholera conclusively demonstrated the role of the water supply in spreading the cholera epidemic in Soho, with the use of a dot distribution map and statistical proof to illustrate the connection between the quality of the water source and cholera cases. His data convinced the local council to disable the water pump, which promptly ended the outbreak.

The Metropolis Water Act introduced the regulation of the water supply companies in London, including minimum standards of water quality for the first time. The Act "made provision for securing the supply to the Metropolis of pure and wholesome water", and required that all water be "effectually filtered" from 31 December 1855. This was followed up with legislation for the mandatory inspection of water quality, including comprehensive chemical analyses, in 1858. This legislation set a worldwide precedent for similar state public health interventions across Europe. The Metropolitan Commission of Sewers was formed at the same time, water filtration was adopted throughout the country, and new water intakes on the Thames were established above Teddington Lock.

Water treatment came to the United States in 1872 when Poughkeepsie, New York, opened the first slow sand filtration plant, dramatically reducing instances of cholera and typhoid fever which had been seriously impacting the local community. Poughkeepsie's design criteria were used throughout the country as a model for other municipalities. Poughkeepsie's original treatment facility operated continuously for 87 years before being replaced in 1959.

== Method of operation ==
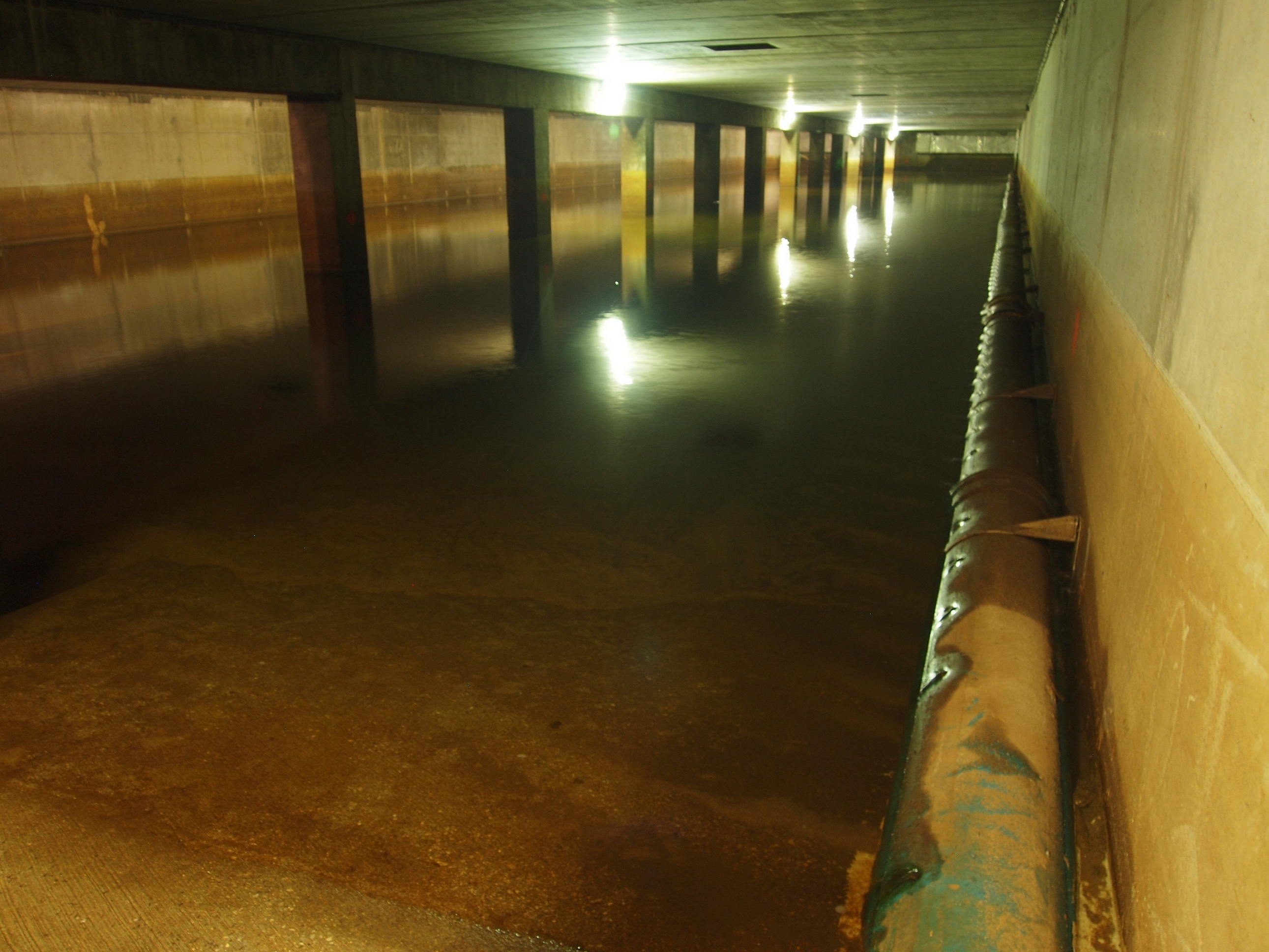
The raw water is let in to the filter room slowly from the pipe on the right. The water will pass through the sand layers down to the bottom of this room. The Schmutzdecke layer can be observed in this picture.

Slow sand filters work through the formation of a gelatinous layer (or biofilm) called the hypogeal layer or Schmutzdecke in the top few millimetres of the fine sand layer. The Schmutzdecke is formed in the first 10–20 days of operation and consists of bacteria, fungi, protozoa, rotifera and a range of aquatic insect larvae. As an epigeal biofilm ages, more algae tend to develop and larger aquatic organisms may be present including some bryozoa, snails and Annelid worms. The surface biofilm is the layer that provides the effective purification in potable water treatment, the underlying sand providing the support medium for this biological treatment layer. As water passes through the hypogeal layer, particles of foreign matter are trapped in the mucilaginous matrix and soluble organic material is adsorbed. The contaminants are metabolised by the bacteria, fungi and protozoa. The water produced from an exemplary slow sand filter is of excellent quality with 90–99% bacterial cell count reduction. Typically, in the UK slow sand filters have a bed depth of 0.3 to 0.6 metres comprising 0.2 to 0.4 mm sand. The throughput is 0.25 m/h.

Slow sand filters slowly lose their performance as the biofilm thickens and thereby reduces the rate of flow through the filter. Eventually, it is necessary to refurbish the filter. Two methods are commonly used to do this. In the first, the top few millimetres of fine sand is scraped off to expose a new layer of clean sand. Water is then decanted back into the filter and re-circulated for a few hours to allow a new biofilm to develop. The filter is then filled to full volume and brought back into service. The second method, sometimes called wet harrowing, involves lowering the water level to just above the hypogeal layer, stirring the sand; thus precipitating any solids held in that layer and allowing the remaining water to wash through the sand. The filter column is then filled to full capacity and brought back into service. Wet harrowing can allow the filter to be brought back into service more quickly.

== Features ==
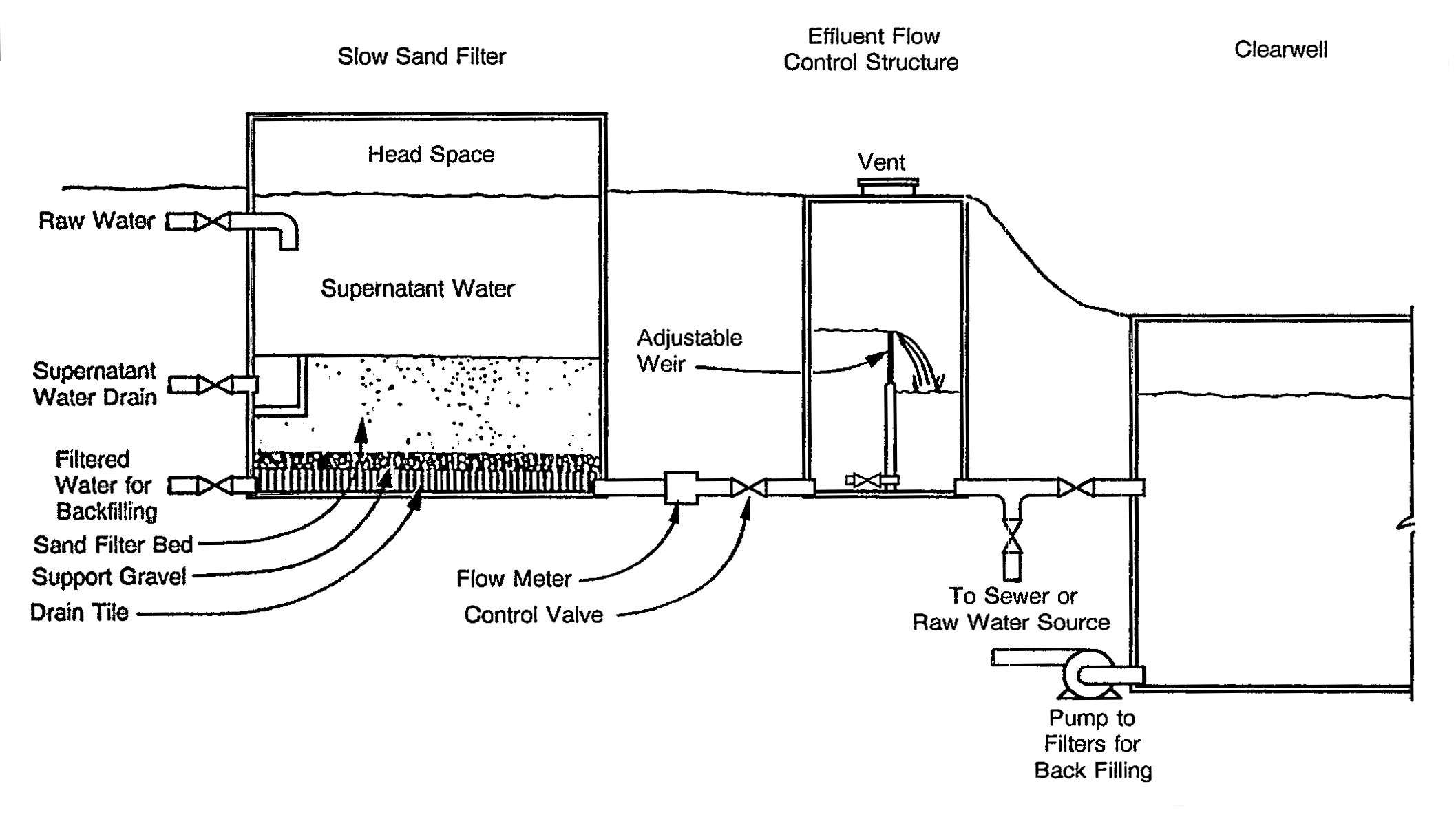
Typical configuration of a housed slow sand filter system

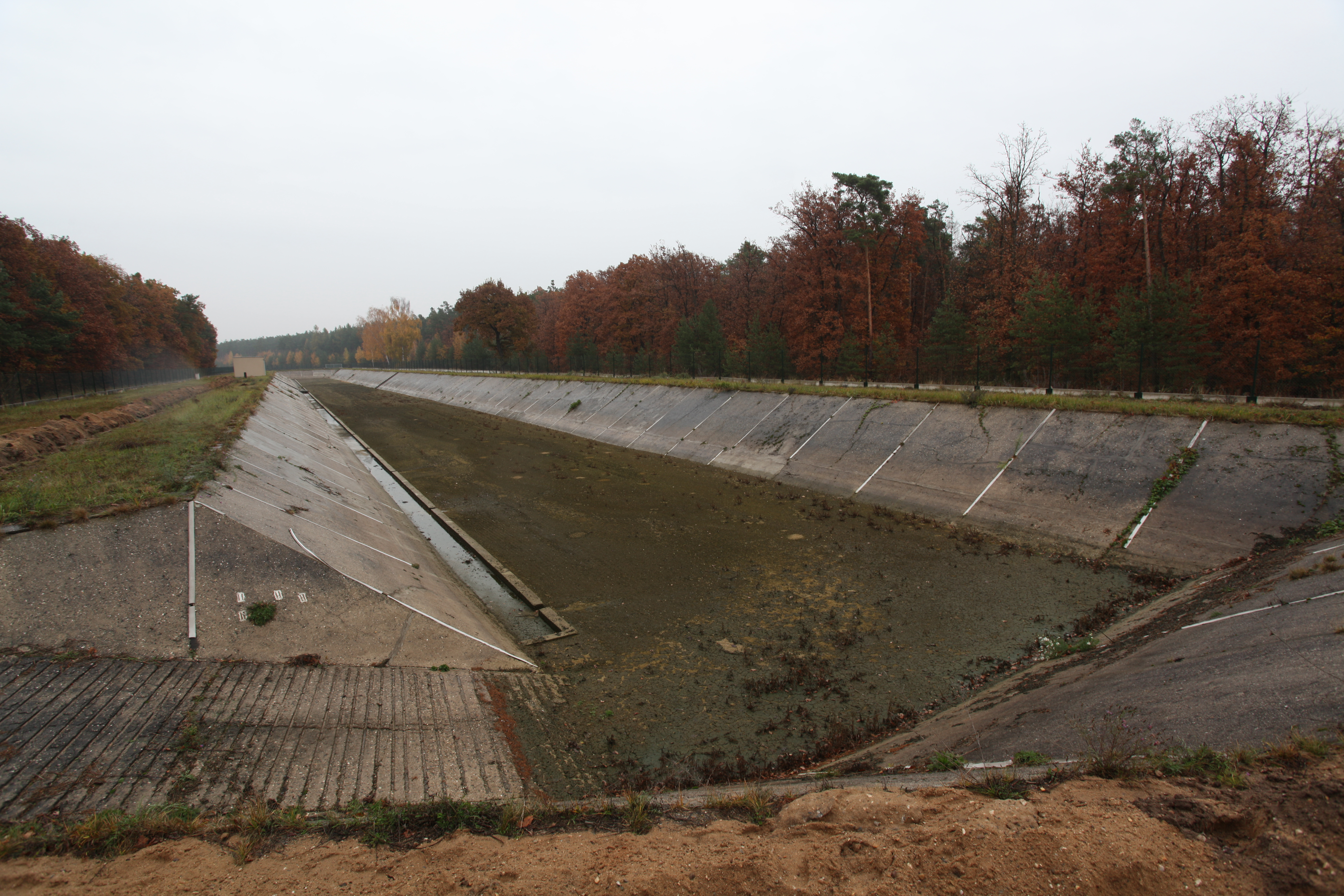
Artificial infiltration works on the principles of slow sand filters

Slow sand filters have a number of unique qualities:

1. Unlike other filtration methods, slow sand filters use biological processes to clean the water, and are non-pressurized systems. Slow sand filters do not require chemicals or electricity to operate.
2. Cleaning is traditionally done by use of a mechanical scraper, which is usually driven into the filter bed once the bed has been dried out. However, some slow sand filter operators use a method called "wet harrowing", where the sand is scraped while still under water, and the water used for cleaning is drained to waste.
3. For municipal systems there usually is a certain degree of redundancy, since it is desirable for the maximum required throughput of water to be achievable with one or more beds out of service.
4. Slow sand filters require relatively low turbidity levels to operate efficiently. In summer conditions with high microbial activity and in conditions when the raw water is turbid, blinding of the filters due to bioclogging occurs more quickly and pre-treatment is recommended.
5. Unlike other water filtration technologies that produce water on demand, slow sand filters produce water at a slow, constant flow rate and are usually used in conjunction with a storage tank for peak usage. This slow rate is necessary for healthy development of the biological processes in the filter.

While many municipal water treatment works will have 12 or more beds in use at any one time, smaller communities or households may only have one or two filter beds.

In the base of each bed is a series of herringbone drains that are covered with a layer of pebbles which in turn is covered with coarse gravel. Further layers of sand are placed on top followed by a thick layer of fine sand. The whole depth of filter material may be more than 1 metre in depth, the majority of which will be fine sand material. On top of the sand bed sits a supernatant layer of unpurified water.

== Advantages ==
- As they require little or no mechanical power, chemicals or replaceable parts, and they require minimal operator training and only periodic maintenance, they are often an appropriate technology for poor and isolated areas.
- Slow sand filters, due to their simple design, may be created DIY. DIY-slow sand filters have been used by organisations like Tearfund in Democratic Republic of Congo and other countries to aid the poor.
- Slow sand filters are recognized by the World Health Organization, Oxfam, and the United States Environmental Protection Agency as being a superior technology for the treatment of surface water sources in small water systems. According to the World Health Organization, "Under suitable circumstances, slow sand filtration may be not only the cheapest and simplest but also the most efficient method of water treatment."

== Disadvantages ==
- Due to the low filtration rate, slow sand filters require extensive land area for a large municipal system. Many municipal systems in the U.S. initially used slow sand filters, but as cities have grown, and because of their need to treat high-turbidity source waters, they subsequently installed rapid sand filters, due to increased demand for drinking water.

== See also ==
- Bank filtration – Type of water filtration
- Biosand filter – Water filtration technique based on slow sand filters
- Trickling filter – Type of wastewater treatment system with a fixed bed of rocks or similar
- Rapid sand filter
