= Hypogeal =

Hypogeal, hypogean, hypogeic and hypogeous (lit. 'underground'; from Ancient Greek ὑπό (hupó) 'under' and γῆ (gê) 'earth') are biological terms describing an organism's activity below the soil surface.

In botany, a seed is described as showing hypogeal germination when the cotyledons of the germinating seed remain non-photosynthetic, inside the seed shell, and below ground. The converse, where the cotyledons expand, throw off the seed shell and become photosynthetic above the ground, is epigeal germination.

In water purification works, the hypogeal (or Schmutzdecke) layer is a biological film just below the surface of slow sand filters. It contains microorganisms that remove bacteria and trap contaminant particles.

The terms hypogean and hypogeic are used for fossorial (burrowing) and troglobitic (or stygobitic) cave-living organisms. The opposite terms are epigean and epigeic.

The term hypogeous is used for fungi with underground fruiting bodies - for example, truffles. The opposite term is epigeous.
