= Gonaphodiopsis montesdeocai =

Scientific classification
- Kingdom: Animalia
- Phylum: Arthropoda
- Clade: Pancrustacea
- Class: Insecta
- Order: Coleoptera
- Suborder: Polyphaga
- Infraorder: Scarabaeiformia
- Family: Scarabaeidae
- Genus: Gonaphodiopsis
- Species: G. montesdeocai

Binomial name
- Gonaphodiopsis montesdeocai Dellacasa, Dellacasa & Gordon, 2012

Species of beetle

Gonaphodiopsis montesdeocai is a species of beetle of the family Scarabaeidae. It is found in Mexico (Veracruz).

== Description ==
Adults reach a length of about 3.5–4.5 mm (0.14–0.18 in). They have an oblong, strongly convex, shiny, glabrous, chestnut-brown body, with the pronotum usually darker, and the elytra paler basally and apically. The legs are chestnut-brown and the club of the antennae is piceous.

== Etymology ==
The species is named in honour of Mexican biologist Enrique Montes de Oca.

== Life history ==
Specimens have been collected in cow dung.
