= Gonaphodiopsis =

Scientific classification
- Kingdom: Animalia
- Phylum: Arthropoda
- Clade: Pancrustacea
- Class: Insecta
- Order: Coleoptera
- Suborder: Polyphaga
- Infraorder: Scarabaeiformia
- Family: Scarabaeidae
- Subfamily: Aphodiinae
- Tribe: Aphodiini
- Genus: Gonaphodiopsis; Dellacasa, Dellacasa & Gordon, 2012

Genus of beetles

Gonaphodiopsis is a genus of beetles of the family Scarabaeidae.

== Species ==
- Gonaphodiopsis deloyai Dellacasa, Dellacasa & Gordon, 2012
- Gonaphodiopsis hypogea Dellacasa, Dellacasa & Gordon, 2012
- Gonaphodiopsis montesdeocai Dellacasa, Dellacasa & Gordon, 2012
- Gonaphodiopsis pachecoi Dellacasa, Dellacasa & Gordon, 2012
- Gonaphodiopsis teopiscaensis Dellacasa, Dellacasa & Gordon, 2012
