= Epigeal =

Organism activity above the soil surface

Epigeal vs. hypogeal germination

Epigeal, epigean, epigeic and epigeous are biological terms describing an organism's activity above the soil surface.

In botany, a seed is described as showing epigeal germination when the cotyledons of the germinating seed expand, throw off the seed shell and become photosynthetic above the ground. The opposite kind, where the cotyledons remain non-photosynthetic, inside the seed shell, and below ground, is hypogeal germination.

The terms epigean, epigeic or epigeous are used for organisms that crawl (epigean), creep like a vine (epigeal), or grow (epigeous) on the soil surface: they are also used more generally for animals that neither burrow nor swim nor fly. The opposite terms are hypogean, hypogeic and hypogeous.

An epigeal nest is a term used for a termite mound, the above ground nest of a colony of termites.

== See also ==
- List of plant morphology terms
