= Rapid sand filter =

Type of filter used in water purification

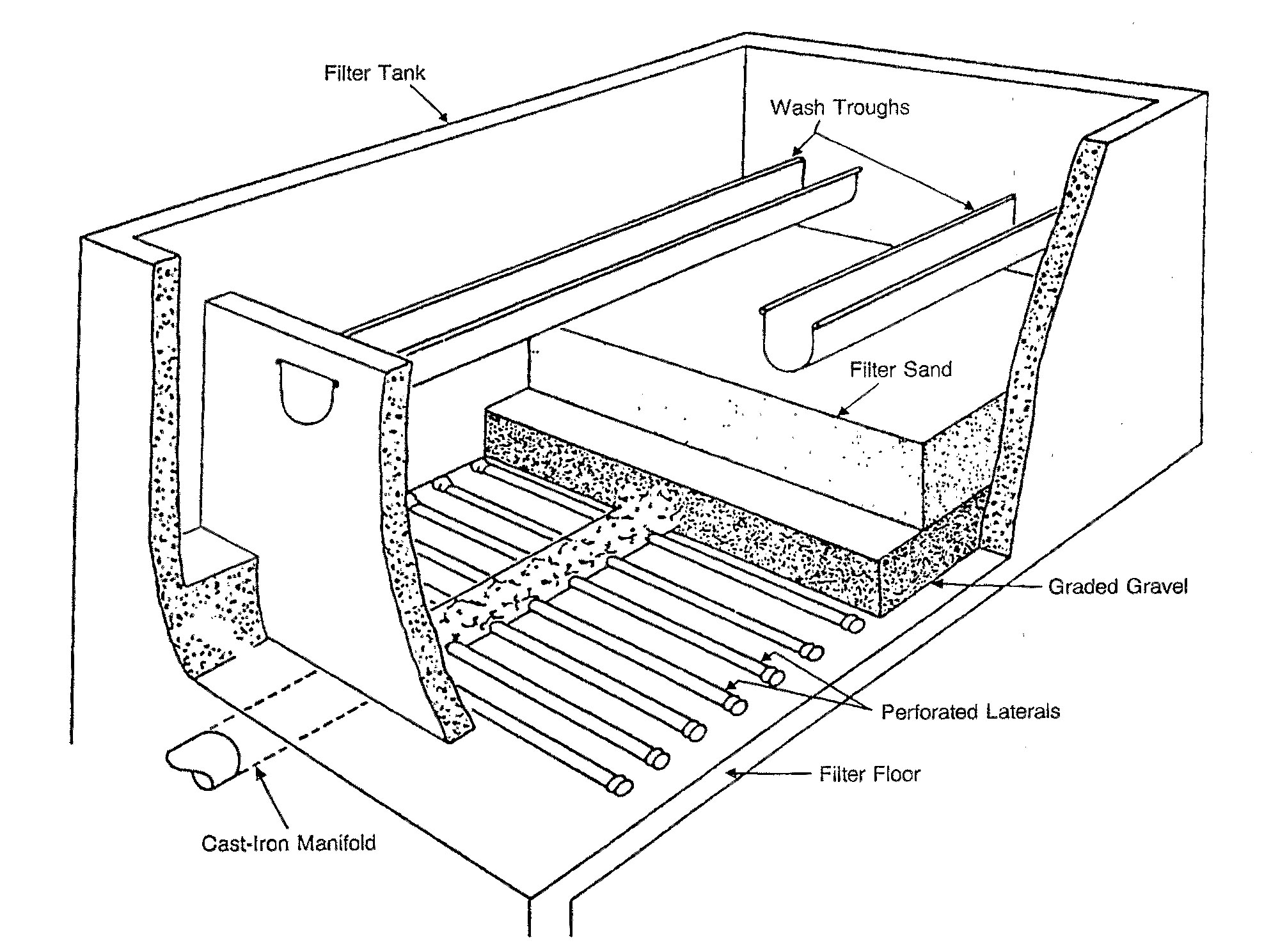
Cutaway view of a typical rapid sand filter

The rapid sand filter or rapid gravity filter is a type of filter used in water purification and is commonly used in municipal drinking water facilities as part of a multiple-stage treatment system. These systems are complex and expensive to operate and maintain, and therefore less suitable for small communities and developing nations.

== History ==
Rapid sand filters were first developed in the 1890s, and improved designs were developed by the 1920s. The first modern rapid sand filtration plant was designed and built by George W. Fuller in Little Falls, New Jersey. Rapid sand filters were widely used in large municipal water systems by the 1920s, because they required smaller land areas compared to slow sand filters.

== Design and operation ==
Rapid sand filters are typically designed as part of multi-stage treatment systems used by large municipalities. These systems are complex and expensive to operate and maintain, and therefore less suitable for small communities and developing nations. The filtration system requires a relatively small land area in proportion to the population served, and the design is less sensitive to changes in raw water quality, e.g. turbidity, than slow sand filters.

Rapid sand filters use relatively coarse sand (0.5 to 1.0 mm) and other granular media, such as anthracite, in beds of 0.6 to 1.2 metre depth to remove particles and impurities that have been trapped in a floc through the use of flocculation chemicals—typically alum. Since media other than silica sand can be used in such filters, a more modern term is "rapid filtration" instead of "rapid sand filtration." The unfiltered water flows at 3000 to 6000 liters/hr/m^2, through the filter medium under gravity or under pumped pressure and the floc material is trapped in the sand matrix.

Mixing, flocculation and sedimentation processes are typical treatment stages that precede filtration. Chemical additives, such as coagulants, are often used in conjunction with the filtration system.

The two types of rapid sand filter are the gravity type (e.g. Paterson's filter) and pressure type (e.g. Candy's filter).

A disinfection system (typically using chlorine or ozone) is commonly used following filtration. Rapid sand filtration has very little effect on taste and smell and dissolved impurities of drinking water, unless activated carbon is included in the filter medium.

Rapid sand filters must be cleaned frequently, often several times a day, by backwashing, which involves reversing the direction of the water and adding compressed air. During backwashing, the bed is fluidized and care must be taken not to wash away the media.

The backwash sequence would typically be:

1. Close inlet valve
2. Isolate controller
3. Allow water to drain down
4. Close outlet valve
5. Start air blower
6. Open air inlet valve
7. Air scour for 0-10 minutes
8. Stop air blowers
9. Close air valve
10. Wait 30 seconds
11. Start washwater pumps
12. Open upwash valve slowly
13. Open wash out valve
14. Wash water for 0-10 minutes
15. Close upwash valve
16. Raise washwater weir
17. Open surface flush inlet,
18. Surface flush for 0-5 minutes
19. Close washout valve
20. Lower washwater weir
21. Bring controller into service
22. Open inlet valve when filter is full

The byproduct of backwashing is sludge. Most treatment works use a sludge thickening process, except for plant which discharge untreated sludge to sewers if the composition is within the tolerable limits. The thickening process comprise batch settling tanks or continuous picket fence thickeners. Polyelectrolytes are added upstream to enhance settleability. Liquid from the process is routed to the inlet of the works. Thickening is followed by either lagooning, drying beds or filter pressing. Thickened sludge may be discharged to a sewer system, tankered away to landfill, or incinerator.

== See also ==
- Slow sand filter
- Bank filtration
- Biosand filter
- Trickling filter
- Automated pool cleaner
