= Bank filtration =

Type of water filtration

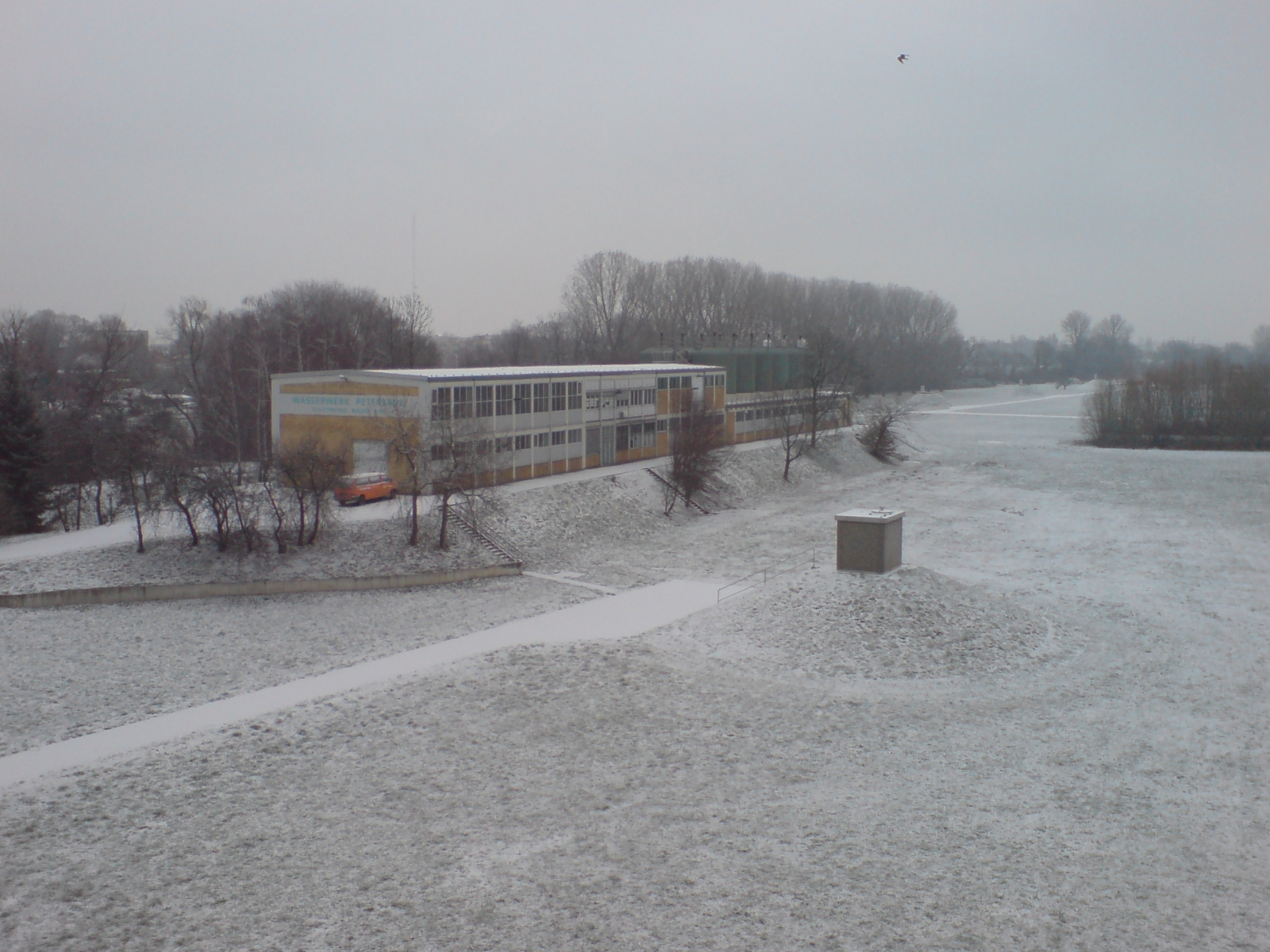
Bank filtration plant in Mainz, Germany. Extraction well on small hill visible in foreground. The Rhine is several dozen meters to the right outside of the picture.

River bank filtration is a type of filtration that works by passing water to be purified for use as drinking water through the banks of a river or lake. It is then drawn off by extraction from a well that is some distance away from the water body. The process may directly yield drinkable water, or be a relatively uncomplicated way of pre-treating water for further purification.

== Usage ==
The process has been in use in Europe, especially in Germany along the Rhine and later in Berlin, since the 1870s. Major facilities also exist in many other countries, including the United States, where Nebraska leads the use of such facilities.

== Procedure ==
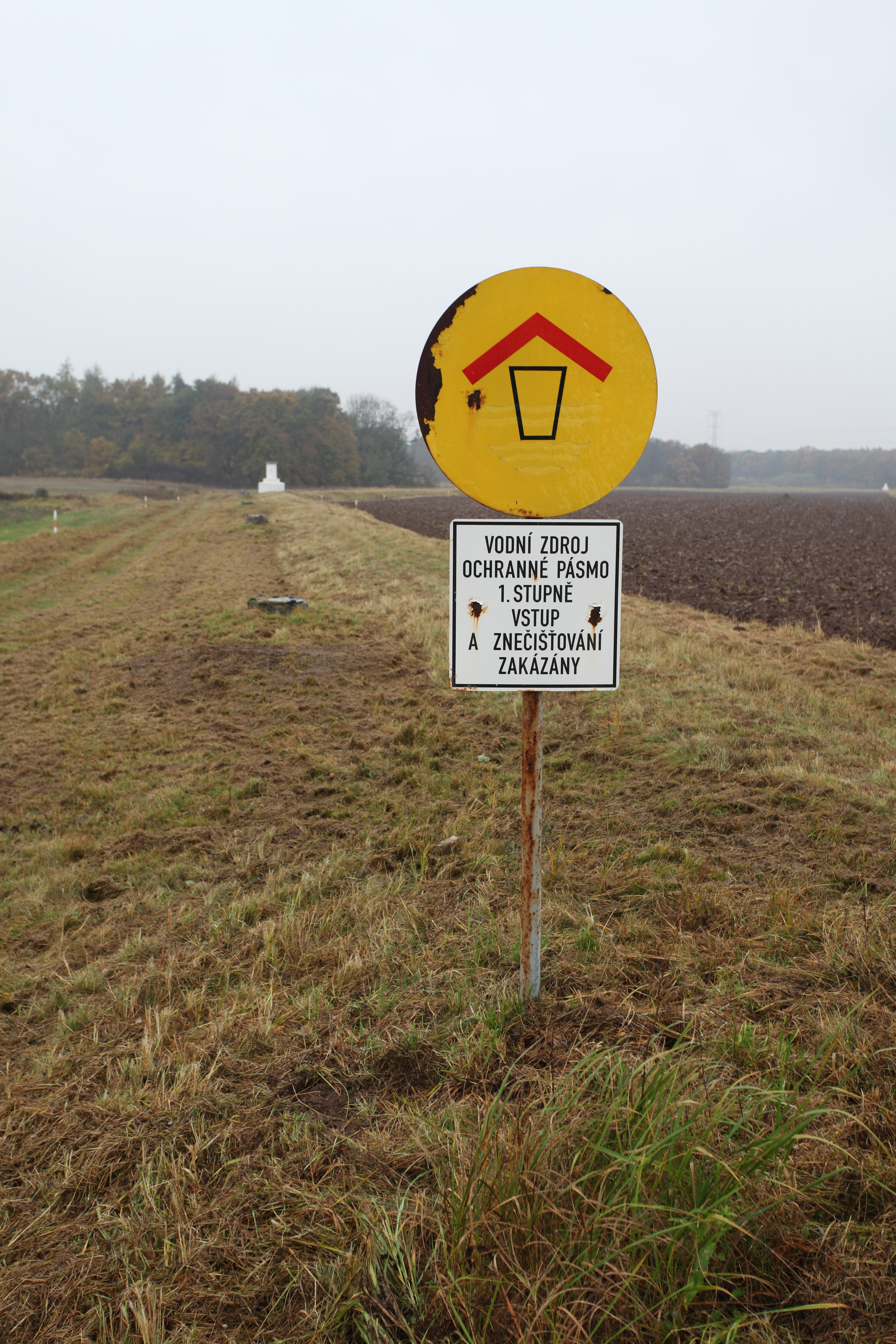
Well line bank infiltration at Jizera river, Czech Republic.

Three filtration mechanisms are possible. Physical filtration or straining takes places when suspended particulates are too large to pass through interstitial spaces between alluvial soil particles. Biological filtration occurs when soil microorganisms remove and digest dissolved or suspended organic material and chemical nutrients.

Chemical filtration or ion exchange may take place when aquifer soils react with soluble chemicals in the water. Most 'normal' contaminants (microbial organisms and inorganic or organic pollutants) will be removed by bank filtration, either because they get filtered out by the sand/earth of the bank, or because the passage of time (which may be days or potentially weeks) is sufficient to render them inactive. Research has also shown that the efficiency of removal depends not only on the contaminant, but also on the "hydraulic and chemical characteristics of the bottom sediment and the aquifer, the local recharge-discharge conditions, and biochemical processes".

== Limitations ==
There have been indications that some pharmaceutical compounds (medical drug traces from human use) may not always be sufficiently removed by bank filtration, and that in areas with substantial contamination of this type, additional treatment may be needed.

== Wastewater applications ==
Alluvial soils may also be used to purify wastewater being returned to a river after use. Treated wastewater is typically discharged into a percolation pond on the alluvial floodplain rather than flowing directly into the river. Chemical filtration will cease when all reactive sites within the flow pathway through aquifer soil have reacted. Physical filtration tends to become more effective as trapped particulates block interstitial passages between alluvial soil particles; but may ultimately limit flow rates through the soil. Particulates on the river side of the soil interface may be periodically scoured away by turbulent flow. Wastewater percolation ponds may require maintenance to break up or remove a scum layer (Schmutzdecke) forming at the bottom of the pond. Biological filtration remains effective unless organic loading causes anaerobic conditions within the riverbed alluvium.

== See also ==
- Biofilter
- Folkewall
- Trickling filter
