= Schmutzdecke =

Biofilm used in water purification

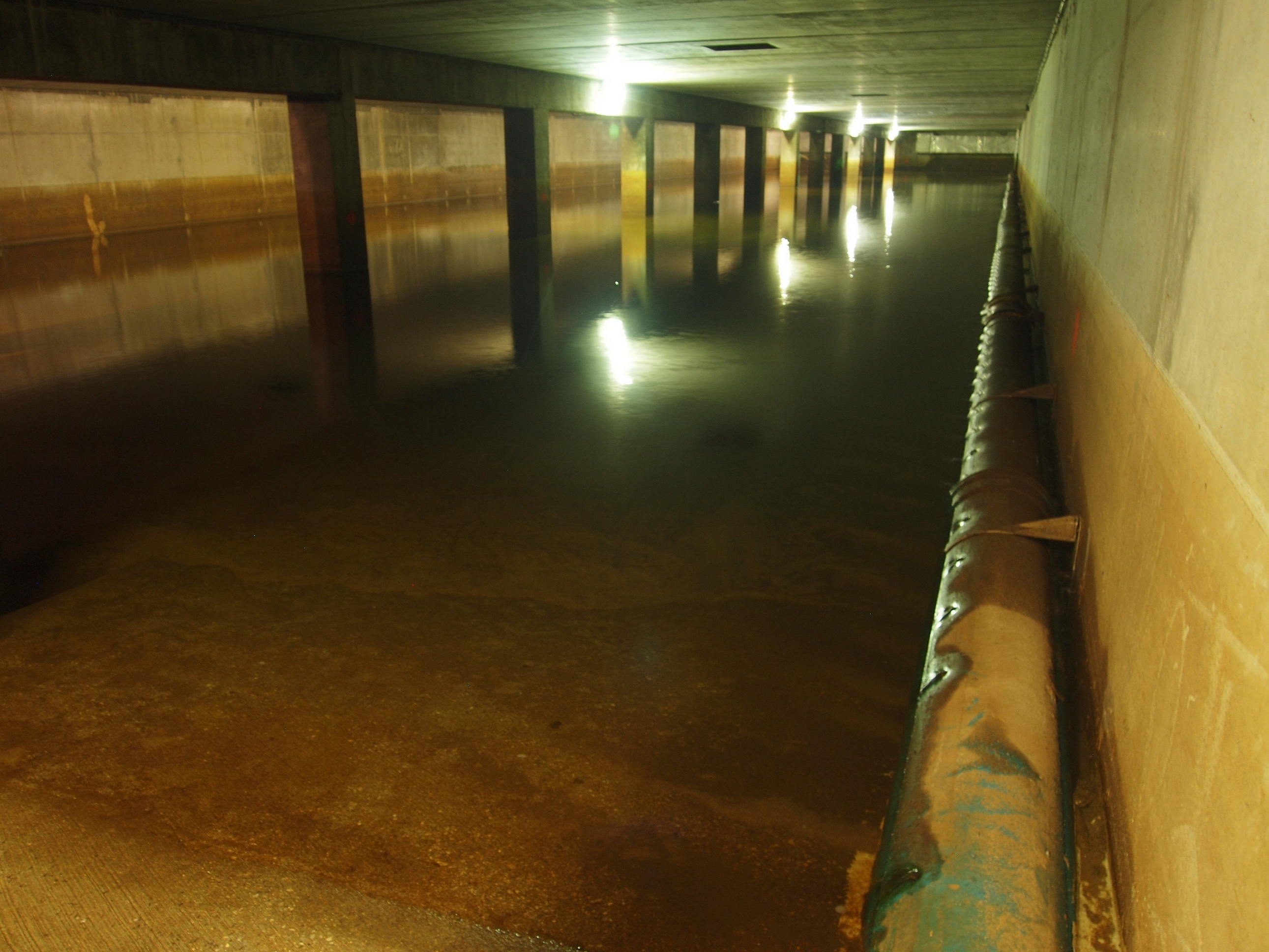
The Schmutzdecke layer on the surface of this slow sand filter

Schmutzdecke (German, "dirt cover" or dirty skin, sometimes wrongly spelled schmutzedecke) is a hypogeal biological layer formed on the surface of a slow sand filter and a form of periphyton. The schmutzdecke is the layer that provides the effective purification in potable water treatment, the underlying sand providing the support medium for this biological treatment layer.

The composition of any particular schmutzdecke varies, but will typically consist of a gelatinous biofilm matrix of bacteria, fungi, protozoa, rotifera and a range of aquatic insect larvae. As a schmutzdecke ages, more algae tend to develop, and larger aquatic organisms may be present including some bryozoa, snails and annelid worms.
