= Coagulation (water treatment) =

In water treatment, the addition of compounds that promote clumping

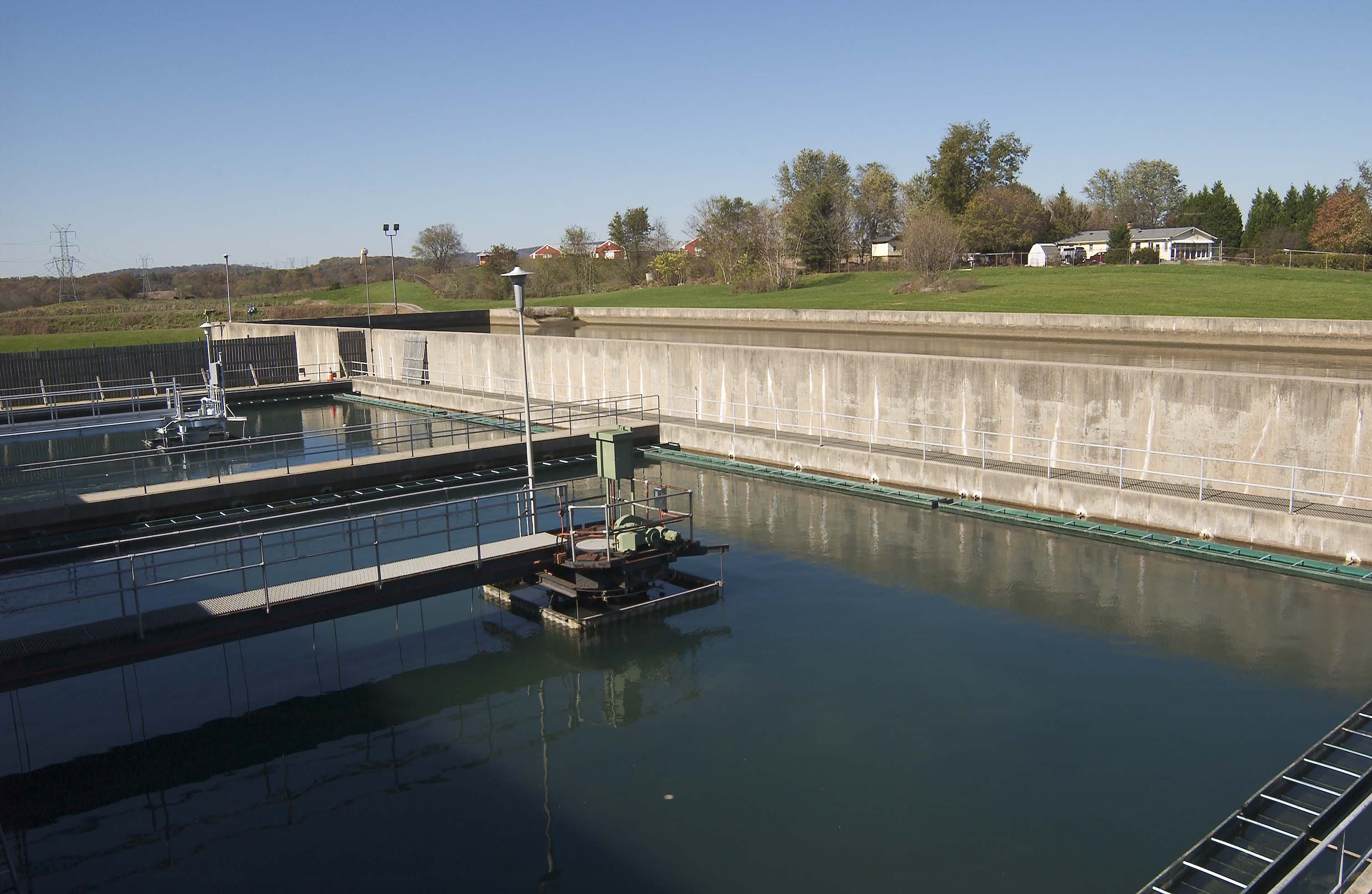
Coagulation-flocculation process in a water treatment system

In water treatment, coagulation and flocculation involve the addition of compounds that promote the clumping of fine floc into larger floc so that they can be more easily separated from the water. Coagulation is a chemical process that involves neutralization of charge whereas flocculation is a physical process and does not involve neutralization of charge. The coagulation-flocculation process can be used as a preliminary or intermediary step between other water or wastewater treatment processes like filtration and sedimentation. Iron and aluminium salts are the most widely used coagulants but salts of other metals such as titanium and zirconium have been found to be highly effective as well.

== Factors ==
Coagulation is affected only by the type of coagulant used, its dose and mass; pH and initial turbidity of the water that is being treated; and properties of the pollutants present. The effectiveness of the coagulation process is also affected by pretreatments like oxidation.

== Mechanism ==
In a colloidal suspension, particles will settle very slowly or not at all because the colloidal particles carry surface electrical charges that mutually repel each other. This surface charge is most commonly evaluated in terms of zeta potential, the electrical potential at the slipping plane. To induce coagulation, a coagulant (typically a metallic salt) with the opposite charge is added to the water to overcome the repulsive charge and "destabilize" the suspension. For example, the colloidal particles are negatively charged and alum is added as a coagulant to create positively charged ions. Once the repulsive charges have been neutralized (since opposite charges attract), van der Waals force will cause the particles to cling together (agglomerate) and form micro floc.

== Determining coagulant dose ==
=== Jar test ===
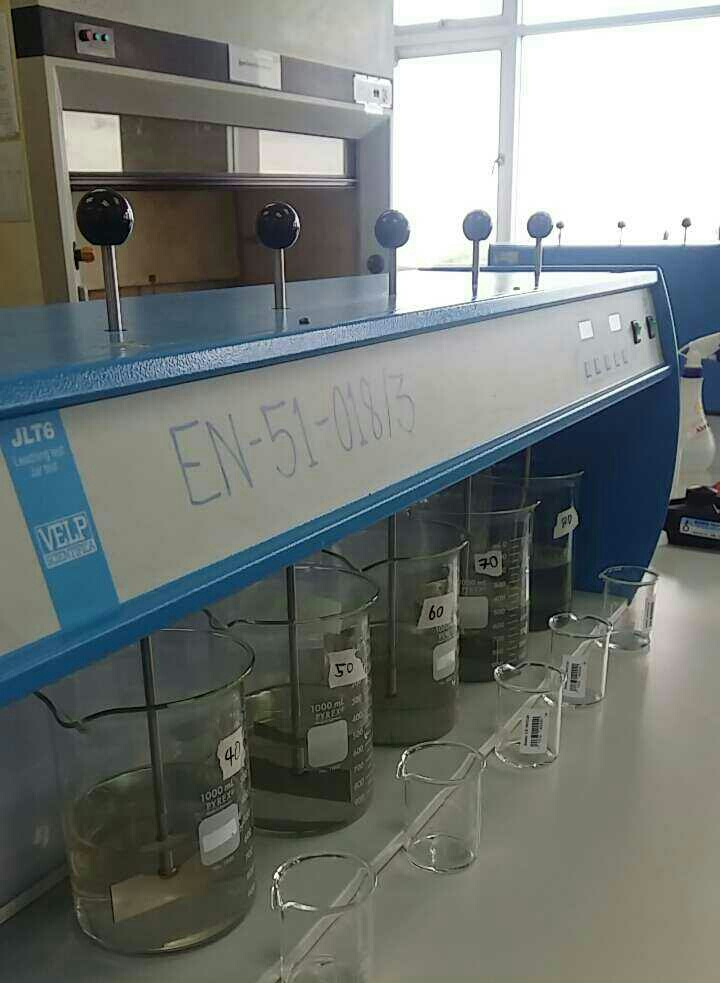
Jar test for coagulation

The dose of the coagulant to be used can be determined via the jar test. The jar test involves exposing same volume samples of the water to be treated to different doses of the coagulant and then simultaneously mixing the samples at a constant rapid mixing time. The microfloc formed after coagulation further undergoes flocculation and is allowed to settle. Then the turbidity of the samples is measured and the dose with the lowest turbidity can be said to be optimum.

=== Microscale dewatering tests ===
Despite its widespread use in the performance of so-called "dewatering experiments", the jar test is limited in its usefulness due to several disadvantages. For example, evaluating the performance of prospective coagulants or flocculants requires both significant volumes of water/wastewater samples (liters) and experimental time (hours). This limits the scope of the experiments which can be conducted, including the addition of replicates. Furthermore, the analysis of jar test experiments produces results which are often only semi-quantitative.

Coupled with the wide range of chemical coagulants and flocculants that exist, determining the most appropriate dewatering agent as well as the optimal dose "is widely considered to be more of an ‘art’ rather than a ‘science’". As such, dewatering performance tests such as the jar test lend themselves well to miniaturization. For example, the Microscale Flocculation Test developed by LaRue et al. reduces the scale of conventional jar tests down to the size of a standard multi-well microplate, which yields benefits stemming from the reduced sample volume and increased parallelization; this technique is also amenable to quantitative dewatering metrics, such as capillary suction time.

=== Streaming current detector ===
An automated device for determining the coagulant dose is the Streaming Current Detector (SCD). The SCD measures the net surface charge of the particles and shows a streaming current value of 0 when the charges are neutralized (cationic coagulants neutralize the anionic colloids). At this value (0), the coagulant dose can be said to be optimum.

Jar test: Mixing different doses of coagulant with samples of the water to be treated

== Limitations ==
Coagulation itself results in the formation of floc but flocculation is required to help the floc further aggregate and settle. The coagulation-flocculation process itself removes only about 60%-70% of Natural Organic Matter (NOM) and thus, other processes like oxidation, filtration and sedimentation are necessary for complete raw water or wastewater treatment. Coagulant aids (polymers that bridge the colloids together) are also often used to increase the efficiency of the process.

== See also ==
- Electrocoagulation
- Industrial wastewater treatment
- Industrial water treatment
- Inspissation
