= Center for Biofilm Engineering =

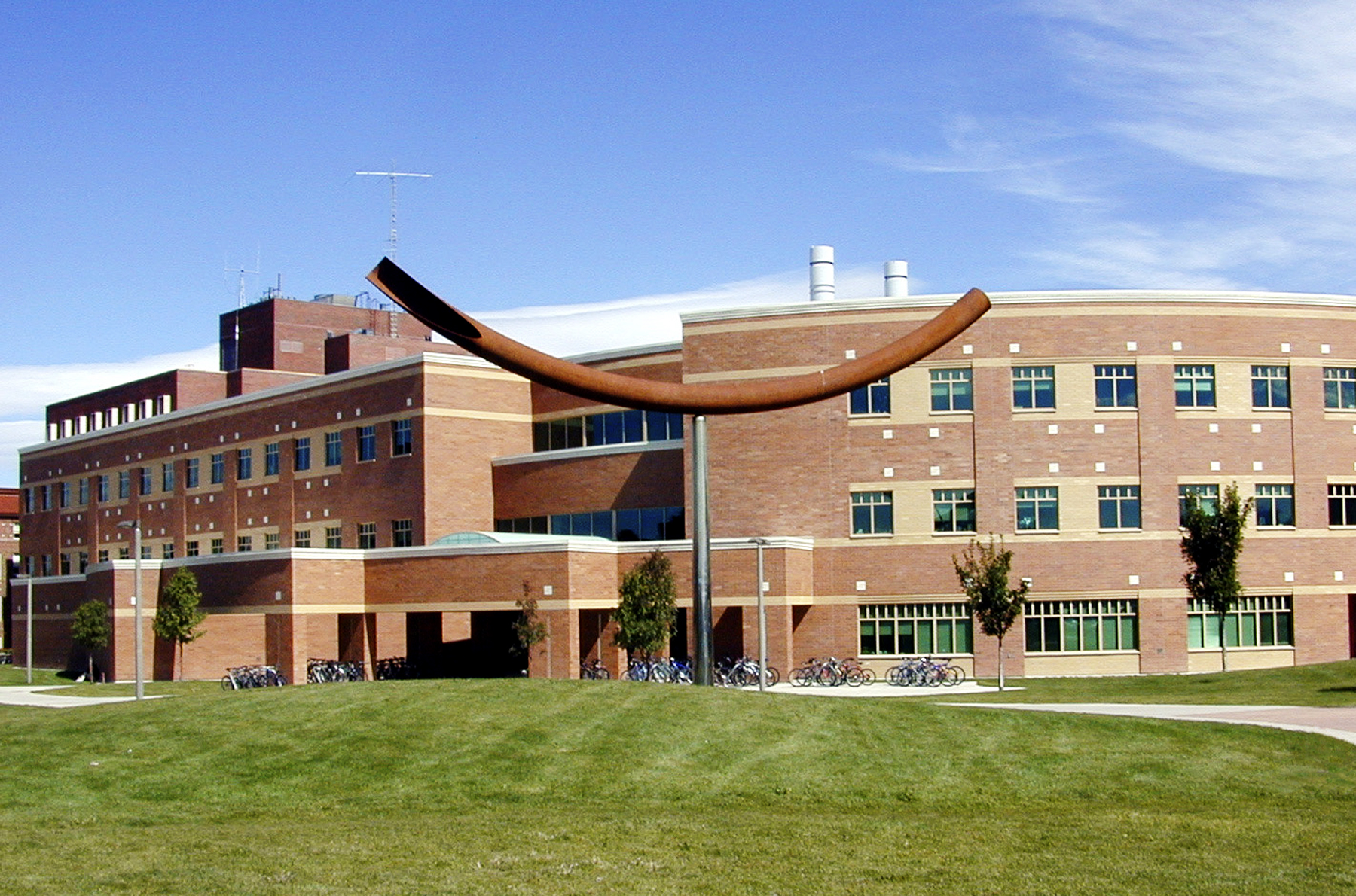
- Montana State University's Barnard Hall, home of Center for Biofilm Engineering
- Parent institution: Montana State University
- Established: April 15, 1990
- Mission: Advance the basic knowledge, technology and education required to understand, control and exploit biofilm processes
- Director: Matthew W. Fields (2015–current); Philip S. Stewart (2005–2015); John W. Costerton (1993–2004); William G. Characklis (1990–92)
- Formerly called: Center for Interfacial Microbial Process Engineering
- Location: Bozeman, Montana, United States
- Coordinates: 45°39′57″N 111°02′47″W
- Interactive map of Center for Biofilm Engineering
- Website: www.biofilm.montana.edu

The Center for Biofilm Engineering (CBE) is an interdisciplinary research, education, and technology transfer institution located on the central campus of Montana State University in Bozeman, Montana. The center was founded in April 1990 as the Center for Interfacial Microbial Process Engineering with a grant from the Engineering Research Centers (ERC) program of the National Science Foundation (NSF). The CBE integrates faculty from multiple university departments to lead multidisciplinary research teams—including graduate and undergraduate students—to advance fundamental biofilm knowledge, develop beneficial uses for microbial biofilms, and find solutions to industrially relevant biofilm problems. The center tackles biofilm issues including chronic wounds, bioremediation, and microbial corrosion through cross-disciplinary research and education among engineers, microbiologists and industry.

== History ==
The center originated as the Institute for Chemical and Biological Process Analysis (IPA) in 1983. In 1990, the center became a national ERC as the Center for Interfacial Microbial Process Engineering based on a $7.2 million grant from the NSF. In 1993 the center assumed its current name—Center for Biofilm Engineering. The original grants expired in 2001 and the center became self-sufficient.

=== Institute for Chemical and Biological Process Analysis (1979–1990) ===
In 1979 W.G. (Bill) Characklis came to Montana State University from Rice University as a professor in civil (environmental) and chemical engineering. He assembled a multidisciplinary team of engineers, microbiologists and chemists to study the processes and effects of microbial growth at interfaces He established a cross-disciplinary environmental biotechnology institute to address the needs of industry in the areas of biofouling, microbial corrosion and biofilm technology. The Institute for Chemical and Biological Process Analysis (IPA) was chartered by the Montana Board of Regents in 1983 within the Montana State University College of Engineering. Bill Characklis was its first director. The IPA provided the foundation for eventual Engineering Research Center status in several ways. The IPA conducted fundamental research, development, and testing for industry and government agencies and it pursued biofilm projects that crossed traditional scientific discipline boundaries. The IPA established an Industrial Associates membership program and by 1989 the program had 12 participating members.

=== Center for Interfacial Microbial Process Engineering (1990–1993) ===
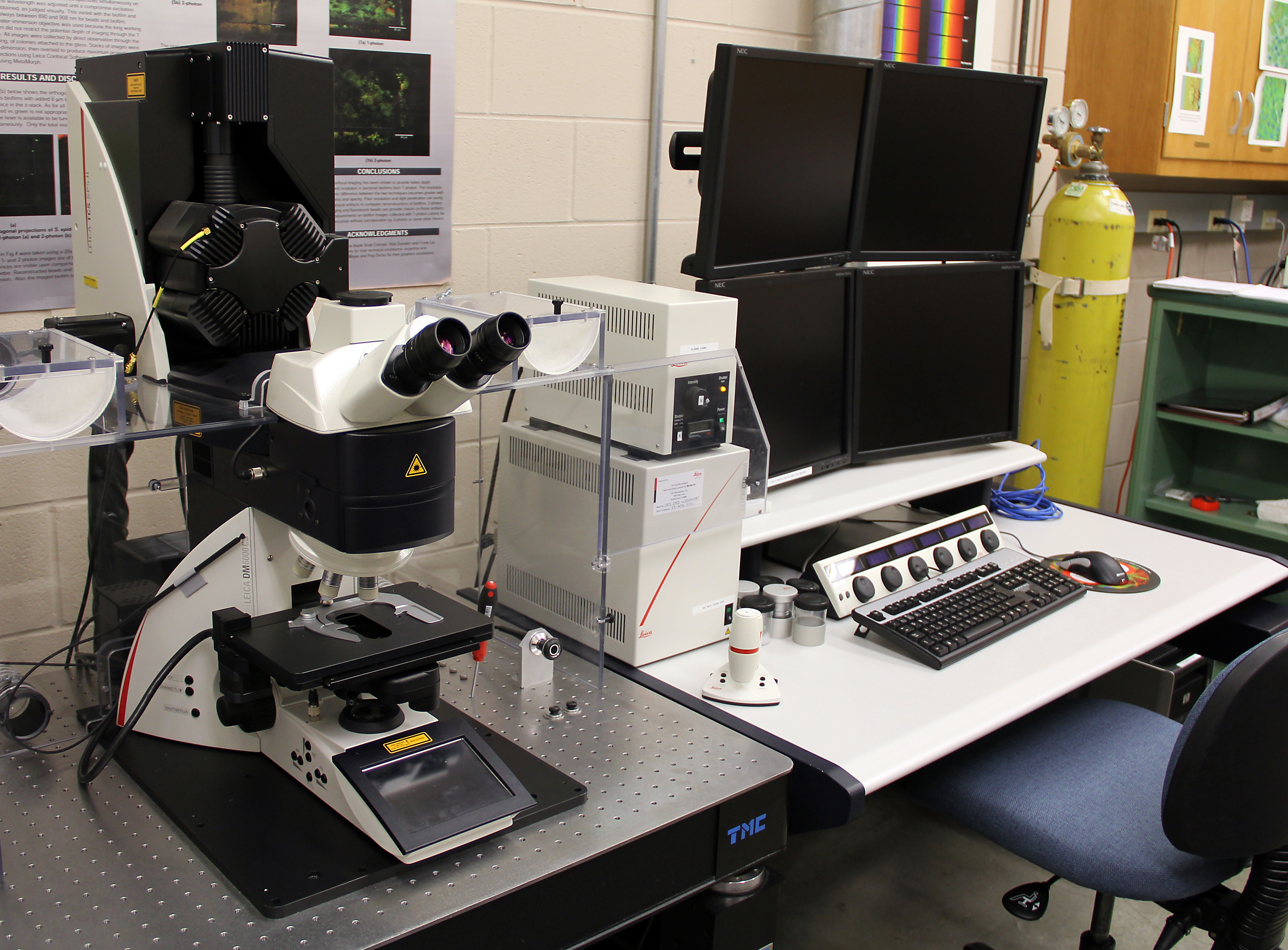
Leica confocal microscope systems

In 1989, the IPA applied to the NSF for Engineering Research Center status, which was granted in April 1990. The Center for Interfacial Microbial Process Engineering was established as one of three national Engineering Research Centers out of 48 applicants. As an ERC, the new organization was charged with building a cross-disciplinary research and education program at Montana State University, as well as increasing U.S. industrial competitiveness in biofilm related technologies. The center's charter mandated that research, education, and technology transfer programs would be fully integrated within the center's program planning. The Industrial Associates program continued to be used as a mechanism for the center to get information from industry about significant biofilm-related problems and collaborate on center research initiatives designed to address biofilm issues. The center's education program recruited students to participate on interdisciplinary research teams and to interact with industry representatives.

The provision of $7.2 million in grants from the NSF during the first five years enabled the expansion of center research into new areas, notably bioremediation and biohydrometallurgy. The center's industrial focus expanded from biofilm control and mitigation to include positive use of biofilm processes to break up soil and water contaminants as well as extracting minerals from low-grade ores. Center projects were designed to span scales of inquiry from fundamental bench-scale to applied field-scale experiments. These projects enabled the continued development of microsensors to measure gradients of gases and pH within biofilm communities, microscopy to elucidate physiological activity of community organisms and modeling to predict biofilm behavior.

=== Center for Biofilm Engineering (1993–present) ===
In 1992, two years after its establishment, the center's first director, Bill Characklis, died. Montana State University signaled its commitment to the center by hiring J.W. (Bill) Costerton, a professor of microbiology from the University of Calgary, as executive director and James Bryers, a professor of biochemical engineering from Duke University, as Director of Research for the center. In 1993 the center's name was changed to Center for Biofilm Engineering (CBE).

Under Costerton's direction the center continued to fulfill its charter and began expanding its scope of inquiry. Costerton encouraged exploration of the bioelectric effect, the phenomenon of cell-cell signaling and its relation to biofilm structure and subsurface biobarrier technologies to protect water and soils from mining contamination. Industrial interest and membership grew in response to more diversified research topics. By 1996 Industrial Associate membership had grown to 19 diversified members including members representing water treatment, mining, government labs, specialty chemicals, consumer products, and oil/energy companies. In June 1996 the National Science Foundation renewed its commitment to the Center for Biofilm Engineering with a new five year grant of $7.6 million.

In 1996 the national profile of the CBE and biofilm research was on the rise. Numerous scientific and mass media publications began to address biofilm technology in earnest. An article in the September 1996 issue of Science, entitled "Biofilms Invade Microbiology" featured the work and history of the Center for Biofilm Engineering. Other magazines and newspapers featuring biofilms and CBE research included New Scientist (cover article, August 31, 1996), Science News (April 26, 1997), the Chicago Sun-Times (May 17, 1998), Science (March 19, 1999), Businessweek (September 12, 1999), Knight Ridder/Tribune News Service (January 7, 2000), Nature (November 16, 2000) and The Boston Globe (May 28, 2002). In 2001 Costerton and CBE Deputy Director Philip S. Stewart authored a biofilm article "Battling Biofilms" published in Scientific American (July 1, 2001)

=== Self-sufficiency (2001–) ===
The NSF ERC program was designed to create institutional centers that would be self-sufficient within ten years. The Center for Biofilm Engineering at Montana State University started planning for self-sufficiency in 1998 through the establishment of a Self-sufficiency Task Force at the university. The center achieved self-sufficiency in 2001 and continues to be funded in part through federal and private grants with continued emphasis on providing value to the Industrial Associates, and support from Montana State University and the State of Montana. In 2005 Philip S. Stewart, a professor of chemical and biological engineering, was selected to be the third CBE Director. Stewart, who had participated as a CBE faculty member since 1991, was a leading expert on antimicrobials and biofilm control. Under Stewart's tenure, CBE grew in affiliated faculty numbers, industrial membership, the number of testing and industry-sponsored projects, and the participation of undergraduate and graduate students. Matthew Fields became the fourth director of the CBE in 2015. In FY2025, the CBE generated $10 million by working with companies representing a variety of industry sectors on testing projects. The center is one of 24 self-sustaining Engineering Research Centers in the National Science Foundation program. The CBE was prominently featured in the book Agents of Change: NSF's Engineering Research Centers, published in 2020 by the NSF and the American Society for Engineering Education.

== Programs ==
=== Research program ===
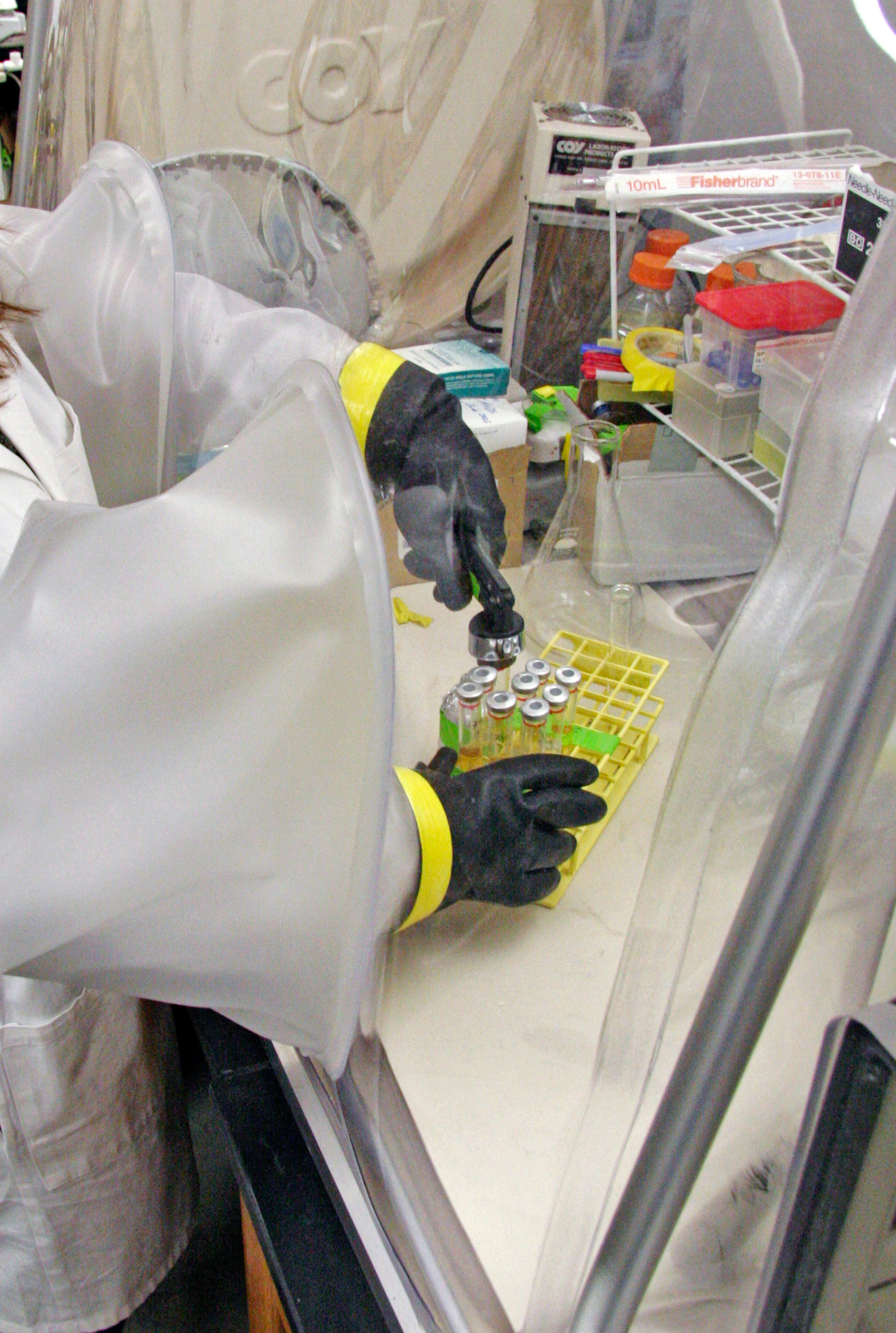
Anaerobic experiment station

The center's biofilm research program was established in the 1980s with a focus on environmental bioengineering, interdisciplinary investigation, and industrial participation. Faculty expertise from civil/environmental engineering, mathematics, microbiology, chemical and biological engineering, chemistry and biochemistry, mechanical and industrial engineering, computer science, electrical engineering, and statistics contributes to hypothesis development and experimental design. The center conducts research that includes multiple scales of observation, from molecular to industrial field-scale, with projects that cover both fundamental and applied topics. CBE research teams have been part of numerous groundbreaking advances in biofilm science and technology including: quorum sensing, permeability (earth sciences), biomineralization, antimicrobial tolerance, viscoelasticity, detachment, standardized biofilm methods, chronic wounds, algae fuel, microbial corrosion, sulfate-reducing bacteria, and biofilm structure and function. CBE research has been published in high-profile peer-reviewed journals including: Nature, The Lancet, Science, JAMA, PNAS, EMBO Journal, ISME Journal, Nature Reviews Microbiology and Physical Review Letters. By 2025, CBE authors had published more than 1,331 peer-reviewed papers. More than 20 of the center's biofilm-related images have appeared on the covers of peer-reviewed journals. And since its inception in 2011, users from 40 countries and 50 states have downloaded 4,000 images from the CBE image library.

Applied research topics addressed by the center in 2025 included:

- Biofilm control strategies (antimicrobial efficacy, biocides, bioactive compounds, disinfectant efficacy)
- Energy solutions (biofuels, coalbed methane production, microbial fuel cells)
- Environmental technologies (bioremediation, wetlands, biomineralization, mining, carbon sequestration)
- Health/medical biofilms (chronic wounds, catheter infections, oral health)
- Industrial systems and processes (biofouling, microbial corrosion, product contamination)
- Standardized methods (product claims, regulatory issues, ASTM methods development)
- Water systems (drinking water quality, premise plumbing, water treatment, distribution systems)

Other research topics in 2025 included:

- Microbial communities in hot (Yellowstone National Park) and cold (Antarctica) environments
- Ecology/physiology
- Mathematical modeling of microbial processes and activities
- Metabolic systems analysis
- Magnetic resonance imaging studies of the effect of biofilm on flow
- Microfluidics
- Microrheology

The center's standing in the international research community and its encouragement of collaboration regularly attracts visiting students and faculty from numerous institutions in the U.S. and foreign countries. Since 1990, 356 visiting researchers from more than 30 countries and 38 U.S. states spent from several weeks to a year or more studying biofilms in CBE laboratories.

=== Industry programs ===
The center's Industrial Associates program provides access to center information, expertise, training and other benefits for a yearly subscription fee. The program was started in 1983 with the creation of the Institute for Chemical and Biological Process Analysis. CBE's Standardized Biofilm Methods research group (SBM) focuses on issues of interest to companies developing new products addressing biofilm formation. Researchers develop, refine, and publish quantitative methods for growing, treating, sampling, and analyzing biofilm bacteria. SBM laboratory members work with international standard-setting organizations to secure approval of biofilm methods by the standard-setting community. Under a contract with the U.S. Environmental Protection Agency, the SBM conducts laboratory research to support the development and standardization of test methods for measuring the performance of antimicrobial products—including those for biofilm bacteria—and provide statistical services related to EPA's Office of Pesticide Programs Antimicrobial Testing Program. The CBE developed the anti-microbial testing standards adopted in 2018 by the U.S. Environmental Protection Agency. The standards are the first to apply specifically to bacterial biofilms. The standards are an outgrowth of research by CBE faculty member Darla Goeres, research professor of regulatory science. The standards provide a certification framework for companies to verify that their products are effective against biofilm bacteria and to label them accordingly, with a statement similar to the "Kills 99.9% of bacteria" found on bottles of bleach and other cleaners. According to CBE biostatistician Al Parker, antimicrobial manufacturers are eager to attain the certification because of growing awareness about bacterial biofilms. Public health entities such as hospitals — which routinely sterilize medical equipment such as surgical devices — are particularly interested, he said. "There's been a paradigm shift," said Parker, whose statistical analysis played a central role in shaping the testing framework.

2026 CBE Industrial Associate Members

In 2013 CBE Director Phil Stewart and CBE Industrial Coordinator Paul Sturman worked to partner with the U.S. Food and Drug Administration (FDA) to co-sponsor a one-day workshop on biofilms. The resulting workshop, "Biofilms, Medical Devices and Anti-Biofilm Technology: Challenges and Opportunities," was held on the FDA White Oak campus on February 20, 2014. A follow-up CBE-hosted meeting on February 11, 2015, in College Park, Maryland, titled "Anti-Biofilm Technologies: Pathways to Productivity" was held to continue fostering scientific dialog between U.S. government agencies, industry and academia.

Member companies have represented several industrial categories including energy/petroleum, chemicals/specialty chemicals, household/consumer products, medical/healthcare, testing laboratories, government laboratories, water, pulp and paper, and mining. Members range from large Fortune 500 international corporations to small start-up companies.

=== Education program ===
Graduate and undergraduate students participate in collaborative, interdisciplinary research at the center. Students work under the guidance of multidisciplinary faculty to solve problems associated with biofilms in medical, industrial, and environmental contexts. Faculty and students from the following MSU departments and programs participated in the center's research from 2011 to 2025.

- Biomedical Engineering
- Chemical & Biological Engineering
- Chemistry & Biochemistry
- Civil Engineering
- Computer Science
- Ecology
- Electrical & Computer Engineering
- Electrical Engineering
- Film & Photography
- Health & Human Development
- Land Resources & Environmental Sciences
- Mechanical & Industrial Engineering
- Microbiology & Cell Biology
- Microbiology & Immunology
- Molecular Biosciences
- Nursing
- Plant Sciences & Plant Pathology

==== Undergraduate studies ====
The Center for Biofilm Engineering's Undergraduate Research Experience (URE) was founded by Director J.W. (Bill) Costerton and Ryan Jordan in the late 1990s. PhD candidate (and subsequent Senior Research Engineer at the CBE) Jordan directed the CBE's first URE students as part of a backcountry water quality program in Yellowstone National Park and the Bridger-Teton Wilderness where URE students under Jordan's direction became the first researchers to identify the role of biofilm in the failure of portable water treatment filters used in disaster relief, military, and outdoor recreation applications.

Undergraduate students are hired as undergraduate research assistants and work in CBE laboratories as members of research teams on interdisciplinary biofilm projects. CBE undergraduates are encouraged to acquire competence in laboratory skills, experimental design and group communication. Since 1990, 1,013 undergraduates from 16 disciplines have worked on laboratory biofilm projects under the direction of CBE-affiliated faculty members. During the academic year 2024–25, 73 undergraduates trained at the CBE, including 54 females and 19 males.

==== Graduate studies ====
Graduate students pursue their degree in a discipline offered through one of the science, agriculture, or engineering departments at Montana State University while they conduct their research in CBE laboratories. Student graduate committees are typically interdisciplinary. The student and graduate committee members select coursework appropriate for the student's interests and degree program. Engineering students are encouraged to take microbiology courses; science students are encouraged to take relevant engineering coursework. Graduate students acquire experience by designing and performing research that crosses traditional academic discipline boundaries and has direct impact on current environmental, industrial, and medical issues. Students work on projects that range from fundamental to applied topics. In addition, the CBE's Industrial Associates program brings students into working relationships with potential employers. Graduate students are encouraged to develop their communication and leadership skills by presenting at research conferences, mentoring undergraduate students, organizing the CBE's seminar series, and assisting with outreach efforts. Since 1990, the CBE has graduated 327 graduate students. During the 2024-25 academic year, 75 graduate students trained at the CBE, including 36 female, 37 male, and two nonbinary persons.

== See also ==
- Biofilm prevention
- Biofilm factory
- Phototrophic biofilms
