= Biofilm prevention =

Stopping microbes attaching to a surface

Biofilm formation occurs when free floating microorganisms attach themselves to a surface. Although there are some beneficial uses of biofilms, they are generally considered undesirable, and means of biofilm prevention have been developed. Biofilms secrete extracellular polymeric substance that provides a structural matrix and facilitates adhesion for the microorganisms; the means of prevention have thus concentrated largely on two areas: killing the microbes that form the film, or preventing the adhesion of the microbes to a surface. Because biofilms protect the bacteria, they are often more resistant to traditional antimicrobial treatments, making them a serious health risk. For example, there are more than one million cases of catheter-associated urinary tract infections (CAUTI) reported each year, many of which can be attributed to bacterial biofilms. There is much research into the prevention of biofilms.

== Methods ==
Biofilm prevention methods fall into two categories:

1. prevention of microbe growth; and
2. prevention of microbe surface attachment.

== Prevention of microbe growth ==
=== Antimicrobial coatings ===
Chemical modifications are the main strategy for biofilm prevention on indwelling medical devices. Antibiotics, biocides, and ion coatings are commonly used chemical methods of biofilm prevention. They prevent biofilm formation by interfering with the attachment and expansion of immature biofilms. Typically, these coatings are effective only for a short time period (about 1 week), after which leaching of the antimicrobial agent reduces the effectiveness of the coating.

The medical uses of silver and silver ions have been known for some time; its use can be traced to the Phoenicians, who would store their water, wine, and vinegar in silver bottles to keep them from spoiling. There has been renewed interest in silver coatings for antimicrobial purposes. The antimicrobial property of silver is known as an oligodynamic effect, a process in which metal ions interfere with the growth and function of bacteria. Several in vitro studies have confirmed the effectiveness of silver at preventing infection, both in coating form and as nanoparticles dispersed in a polymer matrix. However, concerns remain over the use of silver in vivo. Considering the mechanism by which silver interferes with bacterial cell function, some fear that silver may have a similarly toxic effect on human tissue. For this reason, there has been limited use of silver coatings in vivo. Despite this, silver coatings are commonly used on devices such as catheters.

=== Water purification ===
When this technique was studied two purification methods were used to treat water. The first was a typical reverse osmosis technique used for pure water. The other was a double reverse osmosis technique with electric deionization which was continuously disinfected with UV light and disinfected weekly with ozone. The tubing it ran through was tested weekly for bacterial colonies. The highly purified water showed a sharp decrease in bacteria colony adherence. Water purification methods are being scrutinized here because it is in this state that contamination is thought to occur and biofilms are formed.

== Prevention of microbes' surface attachment ==
=== Polymer modification ===
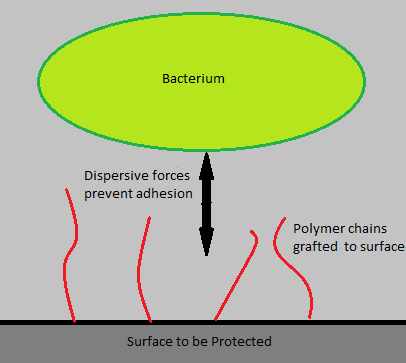
Dispersive forces of grafted polymer chains can prevent bacterial adhesion to a surface

To avoid the undesirable effects of leaching, antimicrobial agents can be immobilized on device surfaces using long, flexible polymeric chains. These chains are anchored to the device surface by covalent bonds, producing non-leaching, contact-killing surfaces. One in vitro study found that when N-alkylpyridinium bromide, an antimicrobial agent, was attached to a poly(4-vinyl-N-hexylpyridine), the polymer was capable of inactivating ≥ 99% of Staphylococcus epidermidis, Escherichia coli, and Pseudomonas aeruginosa bacteria.

Dispersion forces between the polymer chains and the bacterial cells prevent bacteria from binding to the surface and initiating biofilm growth. The concept is similar to that of steric stabilization of colloids. Polymer chains are grafting to a surface via covalent bonding or adsorption. The solubility of these polymers stems from the high conformational entropy of polymer chains in solution. The Χ (Chi) parameter is used to determine whether a polymer will be soluble in a given solution. Χ is given by the equation:

$$\chi = \frac{{(\delta_1-\delta_2})^2 \times \bar{V}}{RT}. \$$

where $\delta_1$ and $\delta_2$ are the cohesive energy densities of the polymer and solvent, respectively, $\bar{V}$ is the molar volume of the solution (assuming $\bar{V_1}=\bar{V_2}$), R is the ideal gas constant and T is temperature in Kelvins. If 0 < $\chi$< 2, the polymer will be soluble.

=== Ozonation ===
Biofilms form as a way of survival for bacteria in aqueous situations. Ozone targets extracellular polysaccharides, a group of bacterial colonies on a surface, and cleaves them. The ozone cuts through the skeleton of the biofilm at a rapid pace thus dissolving it back to harmless microscopic fragments. Ozone is so effective because it is a very strong oxidant and it encounters biofilms in much larger concentrations than most disinfectants like chlorine. This technique has been employed mainly in the spa and pool industry as a way to purify water.

=== Surface charge ===
Modification of the surface charge of polymers has also proven to be an effective means of biofilm prevention. Based on the principles of electrostatics charged particles will repel other particles of like charge. The hydrophobicity and the charge of polymeric chains can be controlled by using several backbone compounds and antimicrobial agents. Positively charged polycationic chains enables the molecule to stretch out and generate bactericidal activity.

== Mechanical ==
=== Hydrophobicity ===
Contact angle of a liquid droplet wetted to a rigid solid surface.

The ability of bacteria to adhere to a surface and begin the formation of a biofilm is determined in part by the enthalpy of adhesion of the surface. Adherence is thermodynamically favored if the free enthalpy of adhesion is negative and decreases with increasing free enthalpy values. The free energy of adhesion can be determined by measuring the contact angles of the substances in question. Young's Equation can be used to determine whether if adhesion is favorable or unfavorable:

$$\gamma_{\mathrm{SL}}+\gamma_{\mathrm{LV}}\cos{\theta_\mathrm{c}}=\gamma_{\mathrm{SV}}\,$$

where $\gamma_{\mathrm{SL}}$, $\gamma_{\mathrm{LV}}$, and $\gamma_{\mathrm{SV}}$ are the interfacial energies of the solid–liquid, the liquid–vapor, and the solid–vapor interfaces, respectively. Using this equation, $\theta_\mathrm{c}$ can be determined.

=== Surface roughness ===
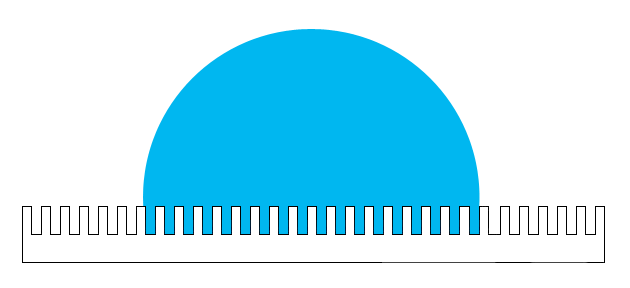
Wenzel model

Surface roughness can also affect biofilm adhesion. Rough, high-energy surfaces are more conducive to biofilm formation and maturation, while smooth surfaces are less susceptible to biofilm adhesion. The roughness of a surface can affect the hydrophobicity or hydrophilicity of the contacting substance, which in turn affects its ability to adhere. The Wenzel equation can be used to estimate the observed contact angle:

$$\cos\,{\theta_{obs}}= R \cos\,{\theta}$$

where $\theta_{obs}$ is the apparent contact angle and R is the roughness parameter of the surface. R is the ratio of actual surface area over projected surface area. The Wenzel equation predicts that a hydrophilic surface will have a lower $\theta_{obs}$, thus making it easier for bacteria to adhere.

It is thus desirable to maintain a smooth surface on any products that may come in contact with bacteria. Studies have shown that there is a threshold value of surface roughness (Ra = 2 μm) below which biofilm adhesion will reduce no further.

=== Low-energy surface acoustic waves ===
This technique uses low-energy waves produced from a battery powered device. The device delivers periodic rectangular pulses through an actuator holding a thin piezo plate. The waves spread to the surface, in this case a catheter, creating horizontal waves that prevent the adhesion of planktonic bacteria to surfaces. This technique has been tested on white rabbits and guinea pigs. The results showed a lowered biofilm growth.

== Examples of antibiofilm agents ==
Antibiofilm agents are the nontoxic molecules which have moieties such as imidazole, indole, sulfide peptides, and triazole, as well as other moieties which possess biofilm dispersal or biofilm formation inhibition properties. Antibiofilm agents include aryl rhodanines, cis-2-Decenoic acid (C2DA), and certain ionic liquids.

=== Aryl rhodanines ===
Aryl rhodanines chemical structure is [(Z)-3-(4-fluorophenyl)-5-(3-ethoxy-4-hydroxybenzylidene)-2-thioxothiazolidin-4-one]. Aryl rhodanines inhibit the adhesion of bacterial cell such as: staphylococcus aureus and enterococci in the first step of biofilm formation, because it prevents the initial interaction between bacterial cells and adhesion surface, the mechanism of inhibit biofilm by these molecules exhibit the physical interaction between aryl rhodanine and adhesine which are located on the bacterial cell surface. These molecules don't have any antimicrobial effect against any type of bacteria.

=== cis-2-Decenoic acid (C2DA) ===
The C2DA inhibit methicillin resistant staphylococcus biofilm, but don't eliminate it. The mechanism of the biofilm inhibition by these molecules is still unknown. C2D is a medium of fatty acid chain that effect on staphylococcus aureus biofilm and dispersion of these biofilm. Pseudomonas aeruginosa is the main source for these molecules.

=== Ionic liquid ===
Ionic liquid is a group of low melting point salts containing anions and cations. It has flexibility to exhibit antibiofilm activity and has antimicrobial activity, it has many antibiofilm activities and prevents the biofilm formation for many gram-positive and gram-negative bacteria.

=== Glycosidase or glycosyl hydrolase ===
Other than chemicals, enzymes have been used to degrade the biofilm matrix and eject biofilm cells forcibly. First shown in P. aeruginosa, a glycosyl hydrolase PslG can trigger biofilm disassembly by disrupting exopolysaccharide matrix in biofilms effectively and can be used in combination with antibiotics to kill the cells released from biofilms.

== See also ==
- Center for Biofilm Engineering
