= J. William Costerton =

John William Fisher "Bill" Costerton FRSC (July 21, 1934, Vernon, British Columbia – May 12, 2012, Kamloops, British Columbia) was a Canadian microbiologist and the main pioneer of the paradigm of microbial life as a community of microorganisms attached to hydrated surfaces by means of biofilms. He is sometimes referred to as the "Father of Biofilms" or the "King of Slime".

== Biography ==
J. William Costerton grew up in Vernon, British Columbia. He endured hardship in his youth because of the early death of this father, Leonard Fisher Costerton (1906–1934), but he managed to graduate from Vernon High School and to attend the University of British Columbia. There he graduated in bacteriology with a bachelor's degree in 1955 and a master's degree in 1956. He received in 1960 his Ph.D. in bacteriology from the University of Western Ontario with doctoral advisor Robert George Everitt Murray. In 1955 J. William Costerton married Vivian Isobel McClounie, whom he met at Vernon High School. In 1960 the couple, in service to the Anglican Church, went to India with their first daughter, Diane, and their first son, John Colin (born in 1959). J. William Costerton served for three years as a medical missionary and developer of a premedical school under the missionary society of the Anglican Church. During these three years, he taught and became the dean of Baring Union Christian College in the Punjab and fluent in Hindustani. The infant John Colin Costerton died in 1961. The family returned briefly to British Columbia, where their second daughter, Sheila, was born in 1962, before the family returned to India. In 1963 the family went to England when J. William Costerton received the Nuffield Scholarship at the University of Cambridge, where he studied under Enid MacRobbie. The Costerton's son Robert was born in England. The Costerton family relocated from England to Montreal, where J. William Costerton did research in Robert Angus MacLeod's laboratory at McGill University. The Costerton's third daughter, Nancy, was born in Montreal. At McGill University, J. William Costerton was promoted to assistant professor in 1968. In the biology department of the University of Calgary, he became in 1970 an associate professor, in 1975 a full professor, and in 1993 a professor emeritus.

In 1993 J. William Costerton and his wife Vivian moved to Bozeman, Montana, where he became the director of Montana State University's Center for Biofilm Engineering (CBE).

In 2004 he became the director of the Center for Biofilms at the College of Dentistry at the University of Southern California (USC). There he and his team did research on biofilms involved in periodontal disease. In 2008 he became the director of biofilm research at Pittsburgh's Allegheny-Singer Research Institute (ASRI) and retained this directorship until his death in 2012.

He was the author or co-author of over 700 scientific publications. He held several biological patents.

The University of Copenhagen's Costerton Biofilm Center is named in his honour.

Upon his death he was survived by his widow, his three daughters, his second-born son Robert, nine grandchildren, and one great-grandchild.

== Eponyms ==
- Costertonia

== Selected publications ==
- Costerton, J. W.; Geesey, G. G.; Cheng, K.-J. (1978). "How Bacteria Stick". Scientific American. 238 (1): 86–95. Bibcode:1978SciAm.238a..86C. doi:10.1038/scientificamerican0178-86. PMID 635520. (over 2050 citations)
- Costerton, J. W.; Cheng, K. J.; Geesey, G. G.; Ladd, T. I.; Nickel, J. C.; Dasgupta, M.; Marrie, T. J. (1987). "Bacterial biofilms in nature and disease". Annual Review of Microbiology. 41: 435–464. doi:10.1146/annurev.mi.41.100187.002251. PMID 3318676. (over 4300 citations)
- Costerton, J. William; Lewandowski, Zbigniew; Caldwell, Douglas E.; Korber, Darren R.; Lappin-Scott, Hilary M. (1995). "Microbial Biofilms". Annual Review of Microbiology. 49: 711–745. doi:10.1146/annurev.mi.49.100195.003431. PMID 8561477. (over 7200 citations)
- Davies, David G.; Parsek, Matthew R.; Pearson, James P.; Iglewski, Barbara H.; Costerton, J. W.; Greenberg, E. P. (1998). "The Involvement of Cell-to-Cell Signals in the Development of a Bacterial Biofilm". Science. 280 (5361): 295–298. Bibcode:1998Sci...280..295D. doi:10.1126/science.280.5361.295. PMID 9535661. (over 4250 citations)
- Costerton, J. W.; Stewart, Philip S.; Greenberg, E. P. (1999). "Bacterial Biofilms: A Common Cause of Persistent Infections". Science. 284 (5418): 1318–1322. Bibcode:1999Sci...284.1318C. doi:10.1126/science.284.5418.1318. PMID 10334980. (over 14200 citations)
- Stewart, Philip S.; William Costerton, J. (2001). "Antibiotic resistance of bacteria in biofilms". The Lancet. 358 (9276): 135–138. doi:10.1016/S0140-6736(01)05321-1. PMID 11463434. S2CID 46125592. (over 5150 citations)
- Donlan, Rodney M.; Costerton, J. William (2002). "Biofilms: Survival Mechanisms of Clinically Relevant Microorganisms". Clinical Microbiology Reviews. 15 (2): 167–193. doi:10.1128/CMR.15.2.167-193.2002. PMC 118068. PMID 11932229. (over 8100 citations)
- Sauer, Karin; Camper, Anne K.; Ehrlich, Garth D.; Costerton, J. William; Davies, David G. (2002). "Pseudomonas aeruginosa Displays Multiple Phenotypes during Development as a Biofilm". Journal of Bacteriology. 184 (4): 1140–1154. doi:10.1128/jb.184.4.1140-1154.2002. PMC 134825. PMID 11807075. (over 2150 citations)
- Stoodley, P.; Sauer, K.; Davies, D. G.; Costerton, J. W. (2002). "Biofilms as Complex Differentiated Communities". Annual Review of Microbiology. 56: 187–209. doi:10.1146/annurev.micro.56.012302.160705. PMID 12142477. (over 3650 citations)
- Hall-Stoodley, Luanne; Costerton, J. William; Stoodley, Paul (2004). "Bacterial biofilms: From the Natural environment to infectious diseases". Nature Reviews Microbiology. 2 (2): 95–108. doi:10.1038/nrmicro821. PMID 15040259. S2CID 9107205. (over 7250 citations)
- Fux, C.A.; Costerton, J.W.; Stewart, P.S.; Stoodley, P. (2005). "Survival strategies of infectious biofilms". Trends in Microbiology. 13 (1): 34–40. doi:10.1016/j.tim.2004.11.010. PMID 15639630. S2CID 10216159. (over 2100 citations)
- James, Garth A.; Swogger, Ellen; Wolcott, Randall; Pulcini, Elinor Delancey; Secor, Patrick; Sestrich, Jennifer; Costerton, John W.; Stewart, Philip S. (2008). "Biofilms in chronic wounds". Wound Repair and Regeneration. 16 (1): 37–44. doi:10.1111/j.1524-475X.2007.00321.x. PMID 18086294. S2CID 23940244. (over 1600 citations)
