= Costertonia =

Scientific classification
- Domain: Bacteria
- Kingdom: Pseudomonadati
- Phylum: Bacteroidota
- Class: Flavobacteriia
- Order: Flavobacteriales
- Family: Flavobacteriaceae
- Genus: Costertonia; Kwon et al. 2006

Type species
- Costertonia aggregata

Species
- C. aggregata

Genus of bacteria

Costertonia is a mesophilic genus of bacteria from the family of Flavobacteriaceae with one known species (Costertonia aggregata). The genus Costertonia is named after the Canadian microbiologist J.W. Costerton.
