= Phototrophic biofilm =

Microbial communities including microorganisms which use light as their energy source

Phototrophic biofilm cultivated in a lab

Cross-section of a microbial mat

Phototrophic biofilms are microbial communities generally comprising both phototrophic microorganisms, which use light as their energy source, and chemoheterotrophs. Thick laminated multilayered phototrophic biofilms are usually referred to as microbial mats or phototrophic mats (see also biofilm). These organisms, which can be prokaryotic or eukaryotic organisms like bacteria, cyanobacteria, fungi, and microalgae, make up diverse microbial communities that are affixed in a mucous matrix, or film. These biofilms occur on contact surfaces in a range of terrestrial and aquatic environments. The formation of biofilms is a complex process and is dependent upon the availability of light as well as the relationships between the microorganisms. Biofilms serve a variety of roles in aquatic, terrestrial, and extreme environments; these roles include functions which are both beneficial and detrimental to the environment. In addition to these natural roles, phototrophic biofilms have also been adapted for applications such as crop production and protection, bioremediation, and wastewater treatment.

== Biofilm formation ==
Biofilm formation is a complicated process which occurs in four general steps: attachment of cells, formation of the colony, maturation, and cell dispersal. These films can grow in sizes ranging from microns to centimeters in thickness. Most are green and/or brown, but can be more colorful.

Biofilm development is dependent on the generation of extracellular polymeric substances (EPS) by microorganisms. The EPS, which is akin to a gel, is a matrix which provides structure for the biofilm and is essential for growth and functionality. It consists of organic compounds such as polysaccharides, proteins, and glycolipids and may also include inorganic substances like silt and silica. EPS join cells together in the biofilm and transmits light to organisms in the lower zone. Additionally, EPS serves as an adhesive for surface attachment and facilitates digestion of nutrients by extracellular enzymes.

Microbial functions and interactions are also important for maintaining the well-being of the community. In general, phototrophic organisms in the biofilm provide a foundation for the growth of the community as a whole by mediating biofilm processes and conversions. The chemoheterotrophs use the photosynthetic waste products from the phototrophs as their carbon and nitrogen sources, and in turn perform nutrient regeneration for the community. Various groups of organisms are located in distinct layers based on availability of light, the presence of oxygen, and redox gradients produced by the species. Light exposure early in biofilm development has an immense impact on growth and microbial diversity; greater light availability promotes more growth. Phototrophs such as cyanobacteria and green algae occupy the exposed layer of the biofilm while lower layers consist of anaerobic phototrophs and heterotrophs like bacteria, protozoa, and fungi. Eukaryotic algae and cyanobacteria in the outer portion use light energy to reduce carbon dioxide, providing organic substrates and oxygen. This photosynthetic activity fuels processes and conversions in the total biofilm community, including the heterotrophic fraction. It also produces an oxygen gradient in the mat which inhibits most anaerobic phototrophs and chemotrophs from growing in the upper regions.

Communication between the microorganisms is facilitated by quorum sensing or signal transduction pathways, which are accomplished through the secretion of molecules which diffuse through the biofilm. The identity of these substances varies depending on the type of microorganism from which it was secreted.

While some of the organisms contributing to the formation of the biofilms can be identified, exact composition of the biofilms is difficult to determine because many of the organisms cannot be grown using pure culture methods. Though pure culture methods cannot be used to identify unculturable microorganisms and do not support the study of the complex interactions between photoautotrophs and heterotrophs, the use of metagenomics, proteomics, and transcriptomics has helped characterize these unculturable organisms and has provided some insight into molecular mechanisms, microbial organization, and interactions in biofilms.

== Ecology ==
Phototrophic biofilms can be found on terrestrial and aquatic surfaces and can withstand environmental fluctuations and extreme environments. In aquatic systems, biofilms are prevalent on surfaces of rocks and plants, and in terrestrial environments they can be located in the soil, on rocks, and on buildings. Phototrophic biofilms and microbial mats have been described in extreme environments like thermal springs, hyper saline ponds, desert soil crusts, and in lake ice covers in Antarctica. The 3.4-billion-year fossil record of benthic phototrophic communities, such as microbial mats and stromatolites, indicates that these associations represent the Earth's oldest known ecosystems. It is thought that these early ecosystems played a key role in the build-up of oxygen in the Earth's atmosphere.

A diverse array of roles is played by these microorganisms across the range of environments in which they can be found. In aquatic environments, these microbes are primary producers, a critical part of the food chain. They perform a key function in exchanging a substantial amount of nutrients and gases between the atmospheric and oceanic reservoirs. Biofilms in terrestrial systems can contribute to improving soil, reducing erosion, promoting growth of vegetation, and revitalizing desert-like land, but they can also accelerate the degradation of solid structures like buildings and monuments.

== Applications ==
There is a growing interest in the application of phototrophic biofilms, for instance in wastewater treatment in constructed wetlands, bioremediation, agriculture, and biohydrogen production. A few are outlined below.

=== Agriculture ===
Agrochemicals such as pesticides, fertilizers, and food hormones are widely used to produce greater quality and quantity of food as well as provide crop protection. However, biofertilizers have been developed as a more environmentally cognizant method of assisting in plant development and protection by promoting the growth of microorganisms such as cyanobacteria. Cyanobacteria can augment plant growth by colonizing on plant roots to supply carbon and nitrogen, which they can provide to plants through the natural metabolic processes of carbon dioxide and nitrogen fixation. They can also produce substances which induce plant defense against harmful fungi, bacteria, and viruses. Other organisms can also produce secondary metabolites such as phytohormones which increase plants' resistance to pests and disease. Promoting growth of phototrophic biofilms in agricultural settings improves the quality of the soil and water retention, reduces salinity, and protects against erosion.

=== Bioremediation ===
Organisms in mats such as cyanobacteria, sulfate reducers, and aerobic heterotrophs can aid in bioremediation of water systems through biodegradation of oils. This is achieved by freeing oxygen, organic compounds, and nitrogen from hydrocarbon pollutants. Biofilm growth can also degrade other pollutants by oxidizing oils, pesticides, and herbicides and reducing heavy metals like copper, lead, and zinc. Aerobic processes to degrade pollutants can be achieved during the day and anaerobic processes are performed at night by biofilms. Additionally, because biofilm response to pollutants during initial exposure suggested acute toxicity, biofilms can be used as sensors for pollution.

=== Wastewater treatment ===
Biofilms are used in wastewater treatment facilities and constructed wetlands for processes such as cleaning pesticide and fertilizer-laden water because it is simple to form flocs, or aggregates, using biofilms as compared to other floc materials. There are also many other benefits to using phototrophic biofilms in treating wastewater, particularly in nutrient removal. The organisms can sequester nutrients from the wastewater and use these along with carbon dioxide to build biomass. The biomass can capture nitrogen, which can be extracted and used in fertilizer production. Due to their quick growth, phototrophic biofilms have greater nutrient uptake than other methods of nutrient removal utilizing algal biomass, and they are easier to harvest because they naturally grow on wastewater pond surfaces.

Phototrophic activity of these films can precipitate dissolved phosphates due to an increase in pH; these phosphates are then removed by assimilation. Increase in pH of the wastewater also minimizes the presence of coliform bacteria.

Heavy metal detoxification in wastewater treatment can also be achieved with these microbes primarily through passive mechanisms such as ion exchange, chelation, adsorption, and diffusion, which constitute biosorption. The active mode is known as bioaccumulation. Biosorption-mediated metal detoxification is influenced by factors including light intensity, pH, density of the biofilm, and organism tolerance of heavy metals. Though biosorption is an efficient process and inexpensive, methods to retrieve heavy metals from the biomass after biosorption still need further development.

Using phototrophic biofilms for wastewater treatment is more energy efficient and economical and has the capability of producing byproducts which can be further processed into biofuels. Specifically cyanobacteria are capable of producing biohydrogen, which is an alternative to fossil fuels and may become a viable source of renewable energy.
