= Biofilm =

Film of microorganisms on a surface

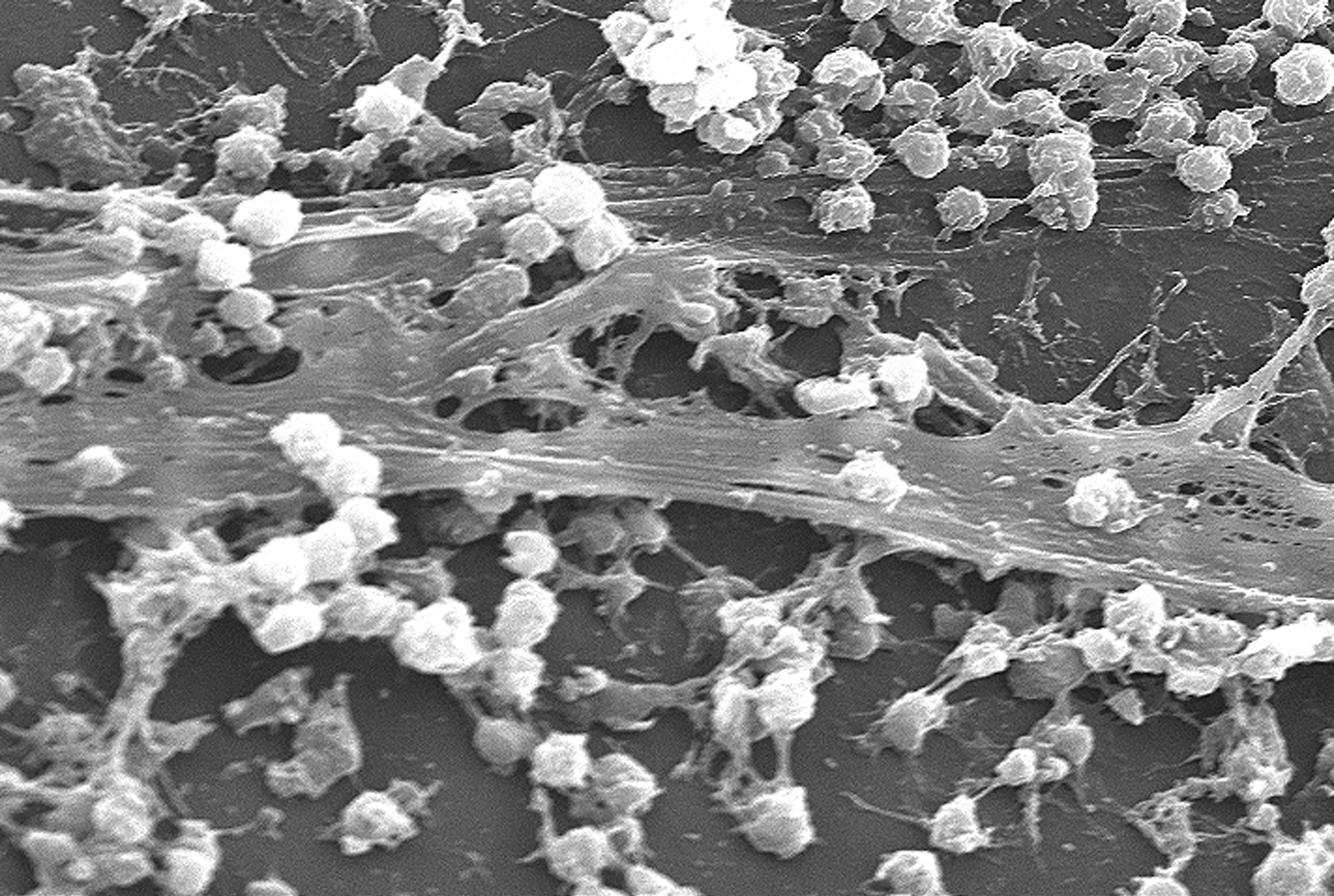
Staphylococcus aureus biofilm on an indwelling catheter

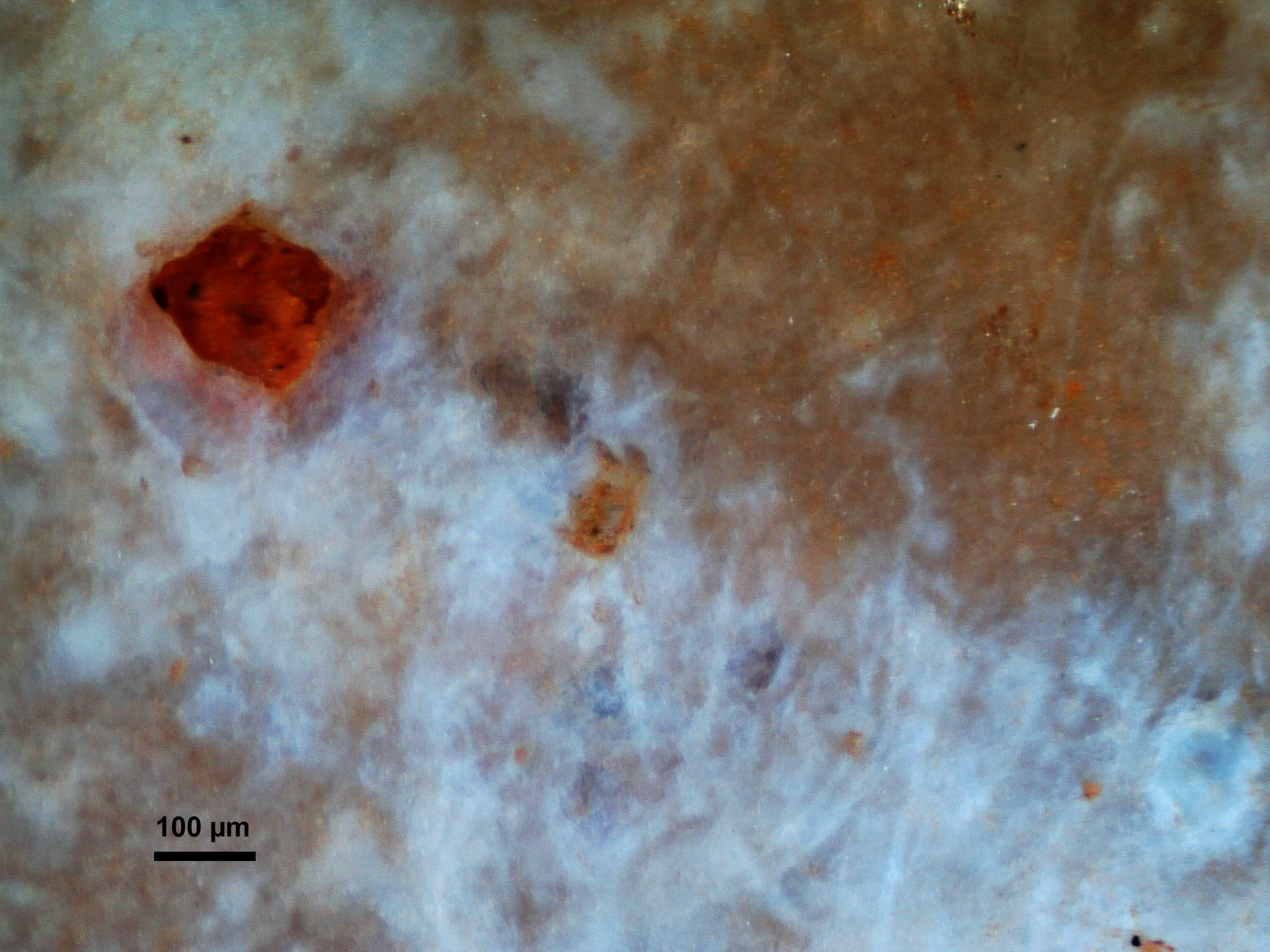
Probable cyanobacteria in the vertical section of a silicified biofilm from the Lower Cretaceous. Very shallow hypersaline environment of the Urgonian carbonate platform of Provence, southeastern France.

IUPAC definition

Aggregate of microorganisms in which cells that are frequently embedded within a self-produced matrix of extracellular polymeric substances (EPSs) adhere to each other and/or to a surface.

- A biofilm is a system that can be adapted internally to environmental conditions by its inhabitants.
- The self-produced matrix of extracellular polymeric substances, which is also referred to as slime, is a polymeric conglomeration generally composed of extracellular biopolymers in various structural forms.

A biofilm is a syntrophic community of microorganisms in which cells stick to each other and often also to a surface. These adherent cells become embedded within a slimy extracellular matrix composed of extracellular polymeric substances (EPSs) produced by them, which are typically a polymeric combination of extracellular polysaccharides, proteins, lipids and DNA. Because they have a three-dimensional structure and represent a community lifestyle for microorganisms, they have been metaphorically described as "cities for microbes." The biofilm allows sharing of nutrients among its residents and serves as a physical barrier against harmful environmental interactions such as desiccation, toxins/antibiotics, bacterivory and attacks from a host body's immune system.

Biofilms may form on living (biotic) or non-living (abiotic) surfaces and can be common in natural, industrial, and hospital settings. They may constitute a microbiome or be a portion of it. The microbial cells growing in a biofilm are physiologically distinct from planktonic cells of the same organism, which, by contrast, are single cells that may float or swim in a liquid medium. Biofilms can form on the teeth of most animals as dental plaque, where they may cause tooth decay and gum disease.

Microorganisms form a biofilm in response to a number of different factors, which may include cellular recognition of specific or non-specific attachment sites on a surface, nutritional cues, lack of light or in some cases, by exposure of planktonic cells to sub-inhibitory concentrations of antibiotics. A cell that switches to the biofilm mode of growth undergoes a phenotypic shift in behavior in which large suites of genes are differentially regulated.

A biofilm may also be considered a hydrogel, which is a complex polymer that contains many times its dry weight in water. Biofilms are not just bacterial slime layers but biological systems; the bacteria organize themselves into a coordinated functional community, and can begin to form when a free-swimming, planktonic bacterium attaches to a surface and then proliferates monoclonally. Biofilms can attach to a surface such as a tooth or rock, and may include a single species or a diverse group of microorganisms. Subpopulations of cells within the biofilm differentiate to perform various activities for motility, matrix production, and sporulation, supporting the overall success of the biofilm.

== Origin and formation ==
=== Origin of biofilms ===
Biofilms are thought to have arisen during primitive Earth as a defense mechanism for prokaryotes, as the conditions at that time were too harsh for their survival. They can be found very early in Earth's fossil records (about 3.25 billion years ago) as both Archaea and Bacteria, and commonly protect prokaryotic cells by providing them with homeostasis, encouraging the development of complex interactions between the cells in the biofilm.

=== Formation of biofilms ===
The formation of a biofilm begins with the attachment of free-floating microorganisms to a surface. The first colonist bacteria of a biofilm may adhere to the surface initially by the weak van der Waals forces and hydrophobic effects. If the colonists are not immediately separated from the surface, they can anchor themselves more permanently using cell adhesion structures such as pili. A unique group of Archaea that inhabit anoxic groundwater have similar structures called hami. Each hamus is a long tube with three hook attachments that are used to attach to each other or to a surface, enabling a community to develop. Hyperthermophilic archaeon Pyrobaculum calidifontis produce bundling pili which are homologous to the bacterial TasA filaments, a major component of the extracellular matrix in bacterial biofilms, which contribute to biofilm stability. TasA homologs are encoded by many other archaea, suggesting mechanistic similarities and evolutionary connection between bacterial and archaeal biofilms.

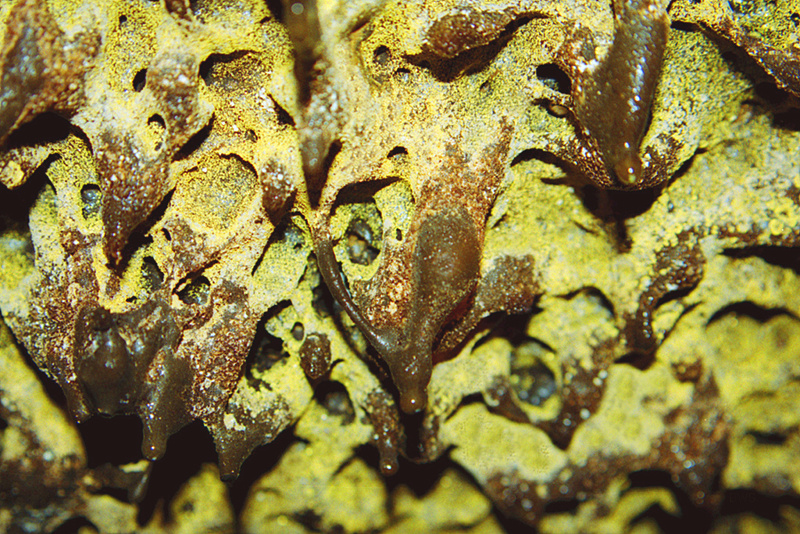
Biofilm of golden hydrophobic bacteria; ceiling of Golden Dome Cave, a lava tube in Lava Beds National Monument

Hydrophobicity can also affect the ability of bacteria to form biofilms. Bacteria with increased hydrophobicity have reduced repulsion between the substratum and the bacterium. Some bacteria species are not able to attach to a surface on their own successfully due to their limited motility but are instead able to anchor themselves to the matrix or directly to other, earlier bacteria colonists. Non-motile bacteria cannot recognize surfaces or aggregate together as easily as motile bacteria.

During surface colonization bacteria cells are able to communicate using quorum sensing (QS) products such as N-acyl homoserine lactone (AHL). Once colonization has begun, the biofilm grows by a combination of cell division and recruitment. Polysaccharide matrices typically enclose bacterial biofilms. The matrix exopolysaccharides can trap QS autoinducers within the biofilm to prevent predator detection and ensure bacterial survival. In addition to the polysaccharides, these matrices may also contain material from the surrounding environment, including but not limited to minerals, soil particles, and blood components, such as erythrocytes and fibrin.

The development of a biofilm may allow for an aggregate cell colony to be increasingly tolerant or resistant to antibiotics. Cell-cell communication or quorum sensing is involved in the formation of biofilm in several bacterial species.

== Development ==
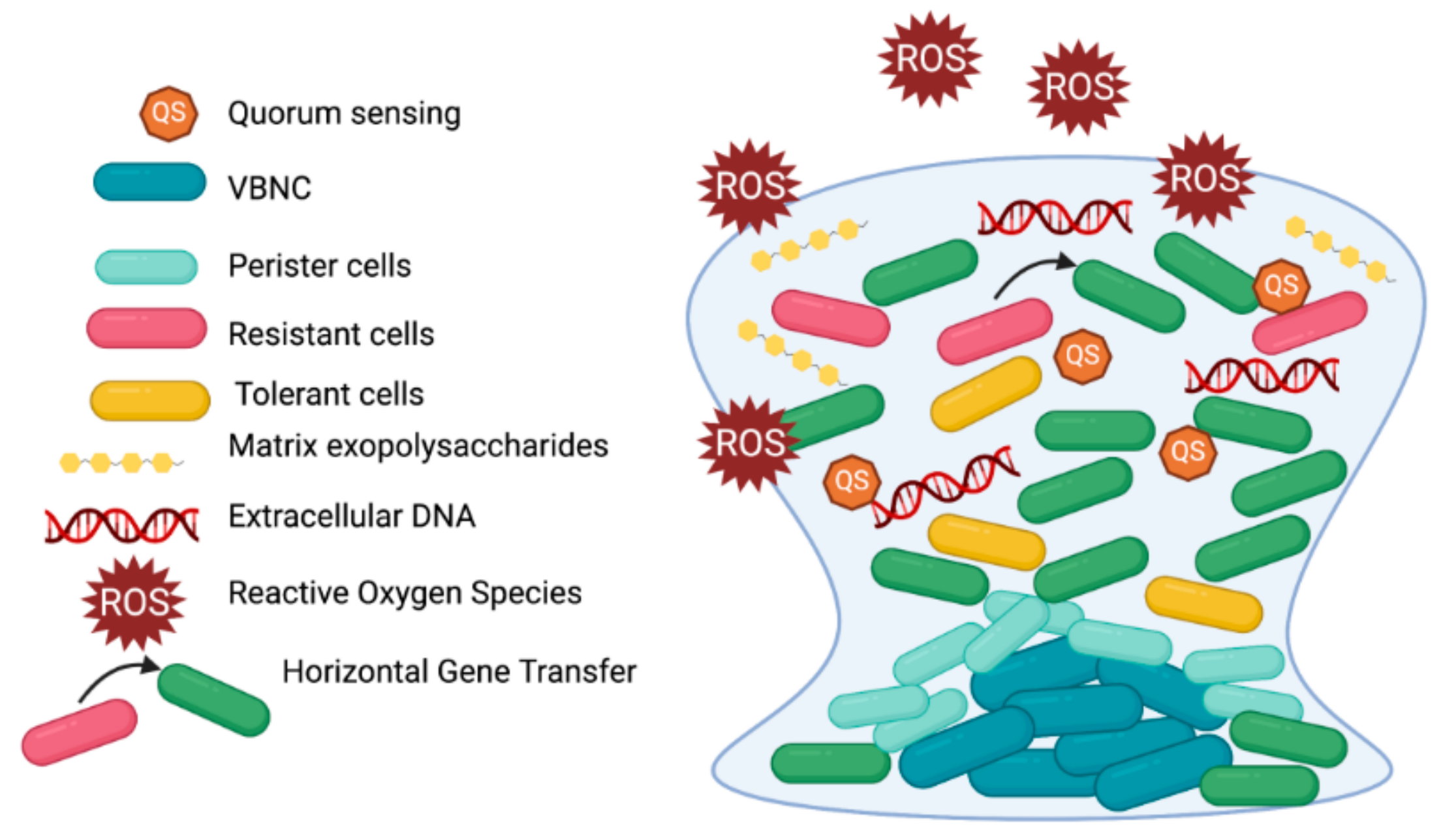
Mature biofilm structure

Biofilm is characterised by heterogenous environment and the presence of a variety of subpopulations. A biofilm structure is composed of metabolically active (both resistant and tolerant) and non-active cells (viable but not culturable cells and persisters) as well as polymer matrix consisting of polysaccharide, extracellular DNA and proteins. Biofilm growth is associated with an escalated level of mutations and horizontal gene transfer which is promoted in due to the packed and dense structure. Bacteria in biofilms communicate by quorum sensing, which activates genes participating in virulence factors production.

Biofilms are the product of a microbial developmental process. The process is summarized by five major stages of biofilm development. The initiation of development starts in the first stage of initial reversible attachment which is initiated by the attachment of planktonic cells to a surface. This initial attachment is then followed by the second stage of irreversible attachment where further microbial aggregation allows cells to attach to their initial foundation. After attachment, stages three and four of formation allow for biofilm maturation, characterized by the appearance of cell clusters embedded into a matrix before completing these stages of maturation through the evolution of micro-colonies. Finally, the fifth stage of development is dispersion, allowing for a fully developed and functional microbial biofilm.

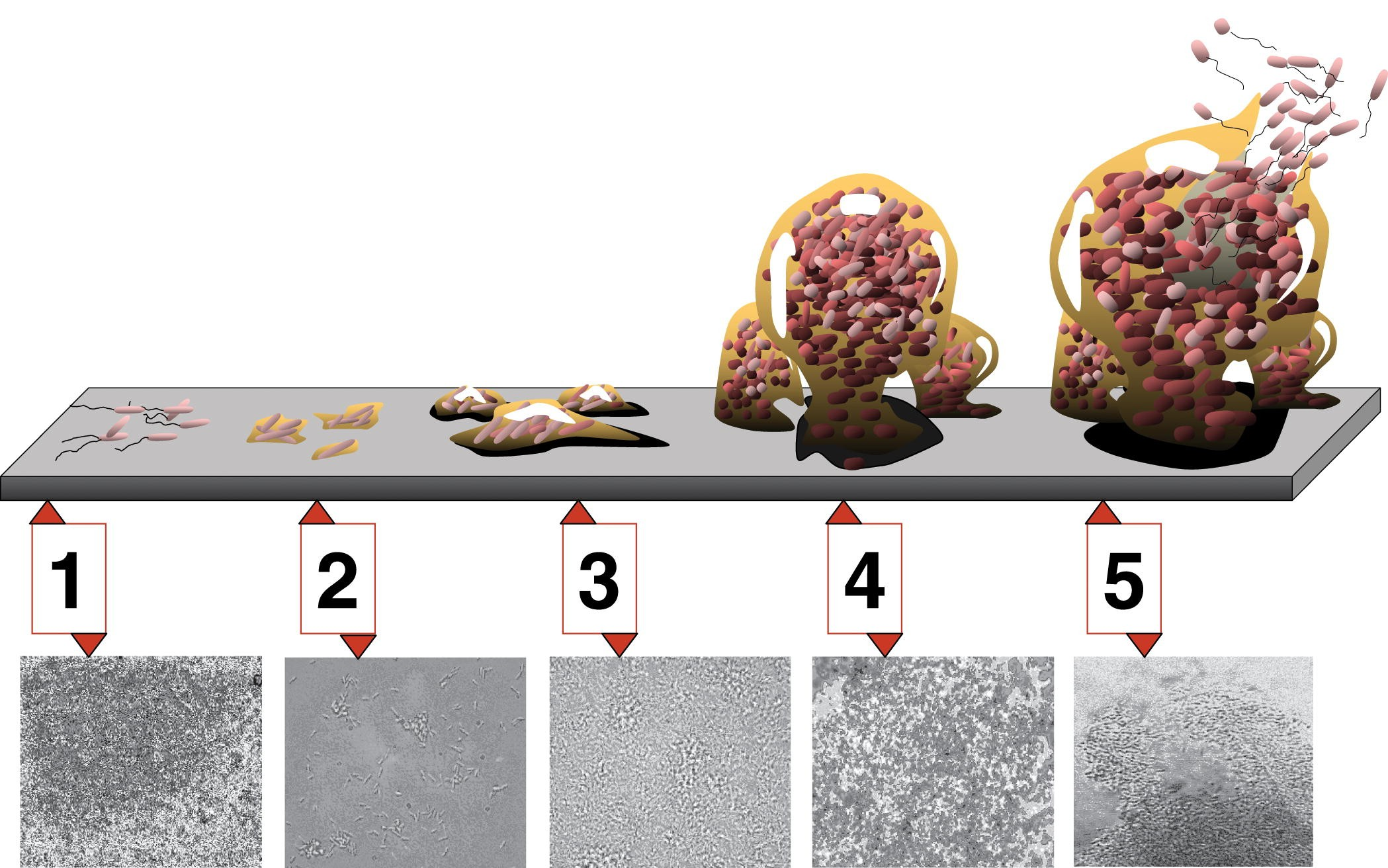
Five stages of biofilm development (1) Initial attachment, (2) Irreversible attachment, (3) Maturation I, (4) Maturation II, and (5) Dispersion. Each stage of development in the diagram is paired with a photomicrograph of a developing P. aeruginosa biofilm. All photomicrographs are shown to the same scale.

== Dispersal ==
Dispersal of cells from the biofilm colony is an essential stage of the biofilm life cycle. Dispersal enables biofilms to spread and colonize new surfaces. Enzymes that degrade the biofilm extracellular matrix, such as dispersin B and deoxyribonuclease, may contribute to biofilm dispersal. Enzymes that degrade the biofilm matrix may be useful as anti-biofilm agents. Evidence has shown that a fatty acid messenger, cis-2-decenoic acid, is capable of inducing dispersion and inhibiting growth of biofilm colonies. Secreted by Pseudomonas aeruginosa, this compound induces cyclo heteromorphic cells in several species of bacteria and the yeast Candida albicans. Nitric oxide has also been shown to trigger the dispersal of biofilms of several bacteria species at sub-toxic concentrations. Nitric oxide has potential as a treatment for patients that have chronic infections caused by biofilms. Antibiofilm methods, such as bacteriophages and CRISPR-Cas system, were developed in April 2026 for biofilm dispersal and disruption.

It was generally assumed that cells dispersed from biofilms immediately go into the planktonic growth phase. However, studies have shown that the physiology of dispersed cells from Pseudomonas aeruginosa biofilms is highly different from that of planktonic and biofilm cells. Hence, the dispersal process is a unique stage during the transition from biofilm to planktonic lifestyle in bacteria. Dispersed cells are found to be highly virulent against macrophages and Caenorhabditis elegans, but highly sensitive towards iron stress, as compared with planktonic cells.

Furthermore, Pseudomonas aeruginosa biofilms undergo distinct spatiotemporal dynamics during biofilm dispersal or disassembly, with contrasting consequences in recolonization and disease dissemination. Biofilm dispersal induced bacteria to activate dispersal genes to actively depart from biofilms as single cells at consistent velocities but could not recolonize fresh surfaces. In contrast, biofilm disassembly by degradation of a biofilm exopolysaccharide released immotile aggregates at high initial velocities, enabling the bacteria to recolonize fresh surfaces and cause infections in the hosts efficiently. Hence, biofilm dispersal is more complex than previously thought, where bacterial populations adopting distinct behavior after biofilm departure may be the key to survival of bacterial species and dissemination of diseases.

Biofilm dispersal

== Properties ==
Biofilms are usually found on solid substrates submerged in or exposed to an aqueous solution, although they can form as floating mats on liquid surfaces and also on the surface of leaves, particularly in high humidity climates. Given sufficient resources for growth, a biofilm will quickly grow to be macroscopic (visible to the naked eye). Biofilms can contain many different types of microorganism, e.g. bacteria, archaea, protozoa, fungi and algae; each group performs specialized metabolic functions. However, some organisms will form single-species films under certain conditions. The social structure (cooperation/competition) within a biofilm depends highly on the different species present.

=== Extracellular matrix ===
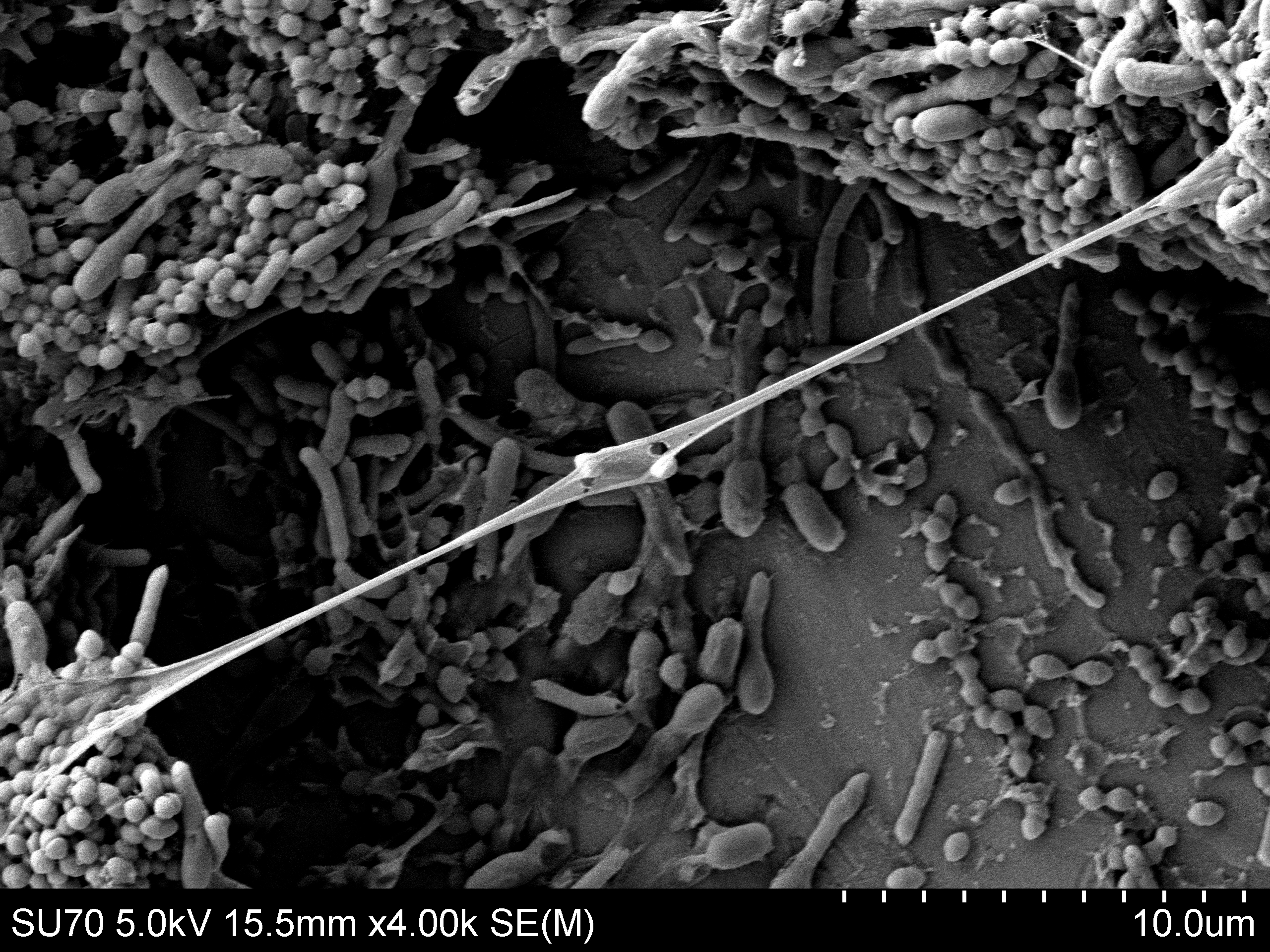
Scanning electron micrograph of mixed-culture biofilm, demonstrating in detail a spatially heterogeneous arrangement of bacterial cells and extracellular polymeric substances.

The EPS matrix consists of exopolysaccharides, proteins and nucleic acids. A large proportion of the EPS is more or less strongly hydrated, however, hydrophobic EPS also occur; one example is cellulose which is produced by a range of microorganisms. This matrix encases the cells within it and facilitates communication among them through biochemical signals as well as gene exchange. The EPS matrix also traps extracellular enzymes and keeps them in close proximity to the cells. Thus, the matrix represents an external digestion system and allows for stable synergistic microconsortia of different species. Some biofilms have been found to contain water channels that help distribute nutrients and signalling molecules. This matrix is strong enough that under certain conditions, biofilms can become fossilized (stromatolites).

Bacteria living in a biofilm usually have significantly different properties from free-floating bacteria of the same species, as the dense and protected environment of the film allows them to cooperate and interact in various ways. One benefit of this environment is increased resistance to detergents and antibiotics, as the dense extracellular matrix and the outer layer of cells protect the interior of the community. In some cases antibiotic resistance can be increased up to 5,000 times. Lateral gene transfer is often facilitated within bacterial and archaeal biofilms and can lead to a more stable biofilm structure. Extracellular DNA is a major structural component of many different microbial biofilms. Enzymatic degradation of extracellular DNA can weaken the biofilm structure and release microbial cells from the surface.

However, biofilms are not always less susceptible to antibiotics. For instance, the biofilm form of Pseudomonas aeruginosa has no greater resistance to antimicrobials than do stationary-phase planktonic cells, although when the biofilm is compared to logarithmic-phase planktonic cells, the biofilm does have greater resistance to antimicrobials. This resistance to antibiotics in both stationary-phase cells and biofilms may be due to the presence of persister cells.

== Habitats ==
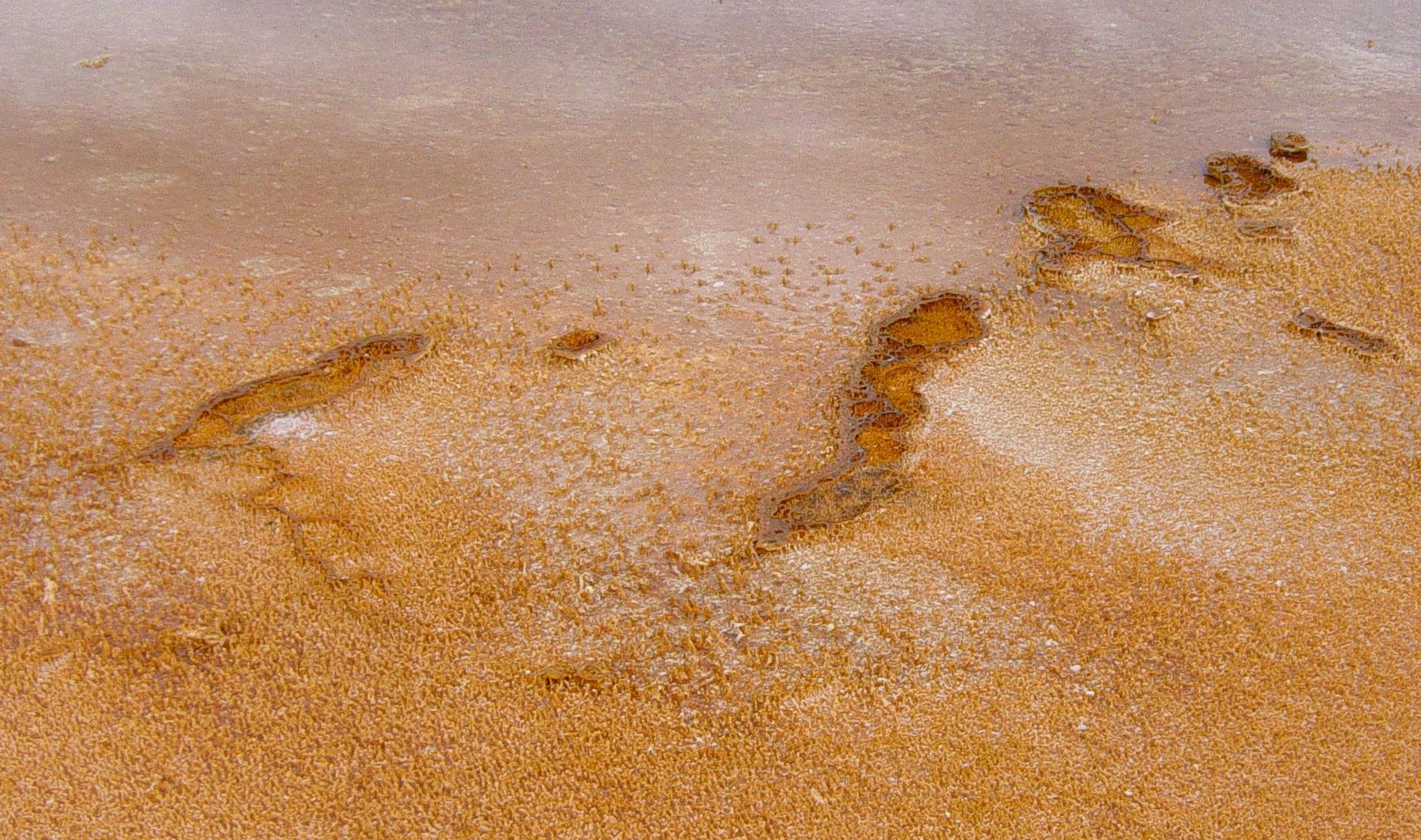
Mats of bacterial biofilm color the hot springs in Yellowstone National Park. The longest raised mat area is about half a meter long.

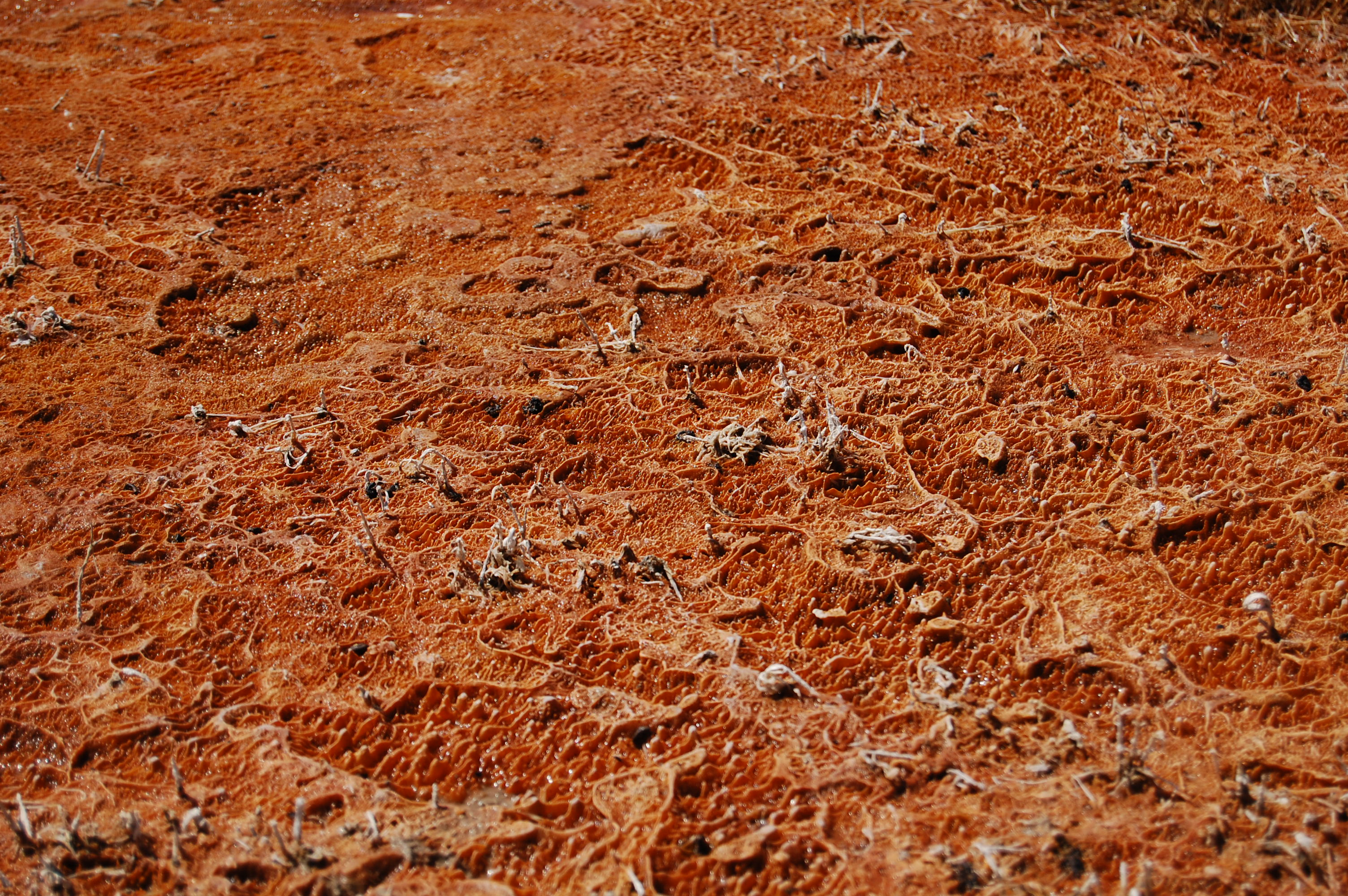
Thermophilic bacteria in the outflow of Mickey Hot Springs, Oregon, approximately 20 mm thick.

Biofilms are ubiquitous in organic life. Nearly every species of microorganism have mechanisms by which they can adhere to surfaces and to each other. Biofilms will form on virtually every non-shedding surface in non-sterile aqueous or humid environments. Biofilms can grow in the most extreme environments: from, for example, the extremely hot, briny waters of hot springs ranging from very acidic to very alkaline, to frozen glaciers.

Biofilms can be found on rocks and pebbles at the bottoms of most streams or rivers and often form on the surfaces of stagnant pools of water. Biofilms are important components of food chains in rivers and streams and are grazed by the aquatic invertebrates upon which many fish feed. Biofilms are found on the surface of and inside plants. They can either contribute to crop disease or, as in the case of nitrogen-fixing rhizobia on root nodules, exist symbiotically with the plant. Examples of crop diseases related to biofilms include citrus canker, Pierce's disease of grapes, and bacterial spot of plants such as peppers and tomatoes.

=== Percolating filters ===
Percolating filters in sewage treatment works are highly effective removers of pollutants from settled sewage liquor. They work by trickling the liquid over a bed of hard material which is designed to have a very large surface area. A complex biofilm develops on the surface of the medium which absorbs, adsorbs and metabolises the pollutants. The biofilm grows rapidly and when it becomes too thick to retain its grip on the media it washes off and is replaced by newly grown film. The washed off ("sloughed" off) film is settled out of the liquid stream to leave a highly purified effluent.

=== Slow sand filter ===
Slow sand filters are used in water purification for treating raw water to produce a potable product. They work through the formation of a biofilm called the hypogeal layer or Schmutzdecke in the top few millimetres of the fine sand layer. The Schmutzdecke is formed in the first 10–20 days of operation and consists of bacteria, fungi, protozoa, rotifera and a range of aquatic insect larvae. As an epigeal biofilm ages, more algae tend to develop and larger aquatic organisms may be present including some bryozoa, snails and annelid worms. The surface biofilm is the layer that provides the effective purification in potable water treatment, the underlying sand providing the support medium for this biological treatment layer. As water passes through the hypogeal layer, particles of foreign matter are trapped in the mucilaginous matrix and soluble organic material is adsorbed. The contaminants are metabolised by the bacteria, fungi and protozoa. The water produced from an exemplary slow sand filter is of excellent quality with 90–99% bacterial cell count reduction.

=== Rhizosphere ===
Plant-beneficial microbes can be categorized as plant growth-promoting rhizobacteria. These plant growth-promoters colonize the roots of plants, and provide a wide range of beneficial functions for their host including nitrogen fixation, pathogen suppression, anti-fungal properties, and the breakdown of organic materials. One of these functions is the defense against pathogenic, soil-borne bacteria and fungi by way of induced systemic resistance (ISR) or induced systemic responses triggered by pathogenic microbes (pathogen-induced systemic acquired resistance). Plant exudates act as chemical signals for host specific bacteria to colonize. Rhizobacteria colonization steps include attractions, recognition, adherence, colonization, and growth. Bacteria that have been shown to be beneficial and form biofilms include Bacillus, Pseudomonas, and Azospirillum. Biofilms in the rhizosphere often result in pathogen or plant induced systemic resistances. Molecular properties on the surface of the bacterium cause an immune response in the plant host. These microbe associated molecules interact with receptors on the surface of plant cells, and activate a biochemical response that is thought to include several different genes at a number of loci. Several other signaling molecules have been linked to both induced systemic responses and pathogen-induced systemic responses, such as jasmonic acid and ethylene. Cell envelope components such as bacterial flagella and lipopolysaccharides, which are recognized by plant cells as components of pathogens. Certain iron metabolites produced by Pseudomonas have also been shown to create an induced systemic response. This function of the biofilm helps plants build stronger resistance to pathogens.

Plants that have been colonized by PGPR forming a biofilm have gained systemic resistances and are primed for defense against pathogens. This means that the genes necessary for the production of proteins that work towards defending the plant against pathogens have been expressed, and the plant has a "stockpile" of compounds to release to fight off pathogens. A primed defense system is much faster in responding to pathogen induced infection, and may be able to deflect pathogens before they are able to establish themselves. Plants increase the production of lignin, reinforcing cell walls and making it difficult for pathogens to penetrate into the cell, while also cutting off nutrients to already infected cells, effectively halting the invasion. They produce antimicrobial compounds such as phytoalexins, chitinases, and proteinase inhibitors, which prevent the growth of pathogens. These functions of disease suppression and pathogen resistance ultimately lead to an increase in agricultural production and a decrease in the use of chemical pesticides, herbicides, and fungicides because there is a reduced amount of crop loss due to disease. Induced systemic resistance and pathogen-induced systemic acquired resistance are both potential functions of biofilms in the rhizosphere, and should be taken into consideration when applied to new age agricultural practices because of their effect on disease suppression without the use of dangerous chemicals.

=== Mammalian gut ===
Studies in 2003 discovered that the immune system supports biofilm development in the large intestine. This was supported mainly with the fact that the two most abundantly produced molecules by the immune system also support biofilm production and are associated with the biofilms developed in the gut. This is especially important because the appendix holds a mass amount of these bacterial biofilms. This discovery helps to distinguish the possible function of the appendix and the idea that the appendix can help reinoculate the gut with good gut flora. However, modified or disrupted states of biofilms in the gut have been connected to diseases such as inflammatory bowel disease and colorectal cancer.

=== Human environment ===
In the human environment, biofilms can grow in showers very easily since they provide a moist and warm environment for them to thrive. Mold biofilms on ceilings may form due to roof leaks. They can form inside water and sewage pipes and cause clogging and corrosion. On floors and counters, they can make sanitation difficult in food preparation areas. In soil, they can cause bioclogging. In cooling- or heating-water systems, they are known to reduce heat transfer. Biofilms in marine engineering systems, such as pipelines of the offshore oil and gas industry, can lead to substantial corrosion problems. Corrosion is mainly due to abiotic factors; however, at least 20% of corrosion is caused by microorganisms that are attached to the metal subsurface (i.e., microbially influenced corrosion).

=== Ship fouling ===
Bacterial adhesion to boat hulls serves as the foundation for biofouling of seagoing vessels. Once a film of bacteria forms, it is easier for other marine organisms such as barnacles to attach. Such fouling can reduce maximum vessel speed by up to 20%, prolonging voyages and consuming fuel. Time in dry dock for refitting and repainting reduces the productivity of shipping assets, and the useful life of ships is also reduced due to corrosion and mechanical removal (scraping) of marine organisms from ships' hulls.

=== Dental plaque ===
Within the human body, biofilms are present on the teeth as dental plaque, where they may cause tooth decay and gum disease. These biofilms can either be in an uncalcified state that can be removed by dental instruments, or a calcified state which is more difficult to remove. Removal techniques can also include antimicrobials.

Dental plaque is an oral biofilm that adheres to the teeth and consists of many species of both bacteria and fungi (such as Streptococcus mutans and Candida albicans), embedded in salivary polymers and microbial extracellular products. The accumulation of microorganisms subjects the teeth and gingival tissues to high concentrations of bacterial metabolites which results in dental disease. Biofilm on the surface of teeth is frequently subject to oxidative stress and acid stress. Dietary carbohydrates can cause a dramatic decrease in pH in oral biofilms to values of 4 and below (acid stress). A pH of 4 at body temperature of 37 °C causes depurination of DNA, leaving apurinic (AP) sites in DNA, especially loss of guanine.

Dental plaque biofilm can result in dental caries if it is allowed to develop over time. An ecologic shift away from balanced populations within the dental biofilm is driven by certain (cariogenic) microbiological populations beginning to dominate when the environment favors them. The shift to an acidogenic, aciduric, and cariogenic microbiological population develops and is maintained by frequent consumption of fermentable dietary carbohydrate. The resulting activity shift in the biofilm (and resulting acid production within the biofilm, at the tooth surface) is associated with an imbalance of demineralization over remineralization, leading to net mineral loss within dental hard tissues (enamel and then dentin), the symptom being a carious lesion, or cavity. By preventing the dental plaque biofilm from maturing or by returning it back to a non-cariogenic state, dental caries can be prevented and arrested. This can be achieved through the behavioral step of reducing the supply of fermentable carbohydrates (i.e. sugar intake) and frequent removal of the biofilm (i.e., toothbrushing).

==== Intercellular communication ====
A peptide pheromone quorum sensing signaling system in S. mutans includes the competence stimulating peptide (CSP) that controls genetic competence. Genetic competence is the ability of a cell to take up DNA released by another cell. Competence can lead to genetic transformation, a form of sexual interaction, favored under conditions of high cell density and/or stress where there is maximal opportunity for interaction between the competent cell and the DNA released from nearby donor cells. This system is optimally expressed when S. mutans cells reside in an actively growing biofilm. Biofilm grown S. mutans cells are genetically transformed at a rate 10- to 600-fold higher than S. mutans growing as free-floating planktonic cells suspended in liquid.

When the biofilm, containing S. mutans and related oral streptococci, is subjected to acid stress, the competence regulon is induced, leading to resistance to being killed by acid. As pointed out by Michod et al., transformation in bacterial pathogens likely provides for effective and efficient recombinational repair of DNA damages. It appears that S. mutans can survive the frequent acid stress in oral biofilms, in part, through the recombinational repair provided by competence and transformation.

Predator-prey interactions

Predator-prey interactions between biofilms and bacterivores, such as the soil-dwelling nematode Caenorhabditis elegans, had been extensively studied. Via the production of sticky matrix and formation of aggregates, Yersinia pestis biofilms can prevent feeding by obstructing the mouth of C. elegans. Moreover, Pseudomonas aeruginosa biofilms can impede the slithering motility of C. elegans, termed as 'quagmire phenotype', resulting in trapping of C. elegans within the biofilms and preventing the exploration of nematodes to feed on susceptible biofilms. This significantly reduced the ability of predator to feed and reproduce, thereby promoting the survival of biofilms. Pseudomonas aeruginosa biofilms can also mask their chemical signatures, where they reduced the diffusion of quorum sensing molecules into the environment and prevented the detection of C. elegans.

== Environmental biogeochemistry ==
In natural environments, biofilms act as highly organized systems with varying complex structures that allow them to carry out many ecological functions. Biofilm formation in natural environments contribute to biological processes including organic matter cycling and ecosystem respiration. Due to these processes, microbial biofilms contribute to biogeochemical fluxes and are recognized as major contributors to global carbon and nitrogen fluxes, releasing large amounts of carbon dioxide and nitrogen gas into the atmosphere. The complex and diverse nature of microbial consortia between communities regulate the chemical exchange between the lithosphere, hydrosphere, and atmosphere.

=== Nutrient cycling ===
Due to biofilms being one of the most widely distributed and diverse microbial communities, they are an important contributor to the cycling of ecological nutrients including nitrogen, phosphorus, carbon, and oxygen. Microbial biofilms vary in their ability to mediate these nutrient processes depending on environmental conditions and the taxonomic and functional composition of the community.

The nitrogen cycle is mediated by microorganisms, and biofilms play an important role in nitrogen fixation, nitrification, denitrification, and ammonification. There is an abundance of nitrogen present on Earth, however, the majority of nitrogen present is not directly usable by most living organisms. Biofilms can play an important role in nitrogen cycling because their specialized structures create nutrient gradients that support nitrogen transformations. In these processes, nitrifying microorganisms can oxidize ammonium to nitrite and nitrate while anoxic microbes, deeper in the matrix can support dendritification where nitrate is reduced to nitrogen gas.This biofilm mediated nitrogen cycling allows biofilms to couple nitrogen transformations more efficiently and supports the release of nitrogen for surrounding organisms to use.

Microbial derived carbon has a strong influence on the composition of soil organic carbon and provides the necessary substrates for soil respiration and methanogenesis. In aquatic environments, biofilms can influence carbon cycling by retaining organic matter within the extracellular matrix. During this process, coupled carbon fixation and respiration occurs within the matrix. Photosynthetic microorganisms within biofilms can fix CO2, while nearby heterotrophs metabolize organic compounds, allowing for fluctuations in carbon levels within the same structured microbial community.

Microbial biofilms in stream ecosystems can accumulate specialized polyphosphate accumulating organisms within the biofilm matrix that facilitate the storage and cycling of phosphorus in the environment in order to prevent nutrient depletion within these microbial communities and the ecosystem present.

=== Biomineralization ===
Microbial activity within a biofilm matrix can promote biomineralization, including the precipitation of calcium carbonate (CaCO3). This process is influenced by the interactions of microbial metabolism and diffusion gradient in pH levels, dissolved inorganic carbon, oxygen, and ion concentration that develop within the microbial matrix. In biofilms, carbon dioxide uptake can raise local pH and shift carbonate chemistry in ways that favor CaCO3 precipitation. The precipitation caused by biomineralization affects many biofilm characteristics including, detachment, permeability, community metabolism, strength, and susceptibility.

=== Stromatolites ===
Stromatolites are layered accretionary structures formed in shallow water by the trapping, binding and cementation of sedimentary grains by microbial biofilms, especially of cyanobacteria. Stromatolites include some of the most ancient records of life on Earth, and are still forming today.

Modern stromatolites display microbial communities in distinct layers and give evidence of the biogeochemical nutrient cycles, allowing for interpretation of ecological characteristics within a biofilm matrix. Stromatolite growth is initiated by the accumulation and entrapment of sediments formed through the process of biomineralization. The layering of different microbial members within stromatolites is due to the timeline of different metabolic processes that occur within a biofilm matrix. Due to this series of formation, physical and chemical characteristics can occur from the coupling of several redox reactions. This metabolic process makes stromatolites a useful model for understanding how biofilm structure influences ecosystem scale geochemical processes.

== Taxonomic diversity ==
Many different bacteria form biofilms, including gram-positive (e.g. Bacillus spp, Listeria monocytogenes, Staphylococcus spp, and lactic acid bacteria, including Lactobacillus plantarum and Lactococcus lactis) and gram-negative species (e.g. Escherichia coli, or Pseudomonas aeruginosa). Cyanobacteria also form biofilms in aquatic environments.

Biofilms are formed by bacteria that colonize plants, e.g. Pseudomonas putida, Pseudomonas fluorescens, and related pseudomonads which are common plant-associated bacteria found on leaves, roots, and in the soil, and the majority of their natural isolates form biofilms. Several nitrogen-fixing symbionts of legumes such as Rhizobium leguminosarum and Sinorhizobium meliloti form biofilms on legume roots and other inert surfaces.

Along with bacteria, biofilms are also generated by archaea and by a range of eukaryotic organisms, including fungi e.g. Cryptococcus laurentii and microalgae. Among microalgae, one of the main progenitors of biofilms are diatoms, which colonise both fresh and marine environments worldwide.

For other species in disease-associated biofilms and biofilms arising from eukaryotes, see below.

== Infectious diseases ==
Biofilms have been found to be involved in a wide variety of microbial infections in the body, by one estimate 80% of all infections. Infectious processes in which biofilms have been implicated include common problems such as bacterial vaginosis, urinary tract infections, catheter infections, middle-ear infections, formation of dental plaque, gingivitis, coating contact lenses, and less common but more lethal processes such as endocarditis, infections in cystic fibrosis, and infections of permanent indwelling devices such as joint prostheses, heart valves, and intervertebral disc. The first visual evidence of a biofilm was recorded after spine surgery. It was found that in the absence of clinical presentation of infection, impregnated bacteria could form a biofilm around an implant, and this biofilm can remain undetected via contemporary diagnostic methods, including swabbing. Implant biofilm is frequently present in "aseptic" pseudarthrosis cases. Furthermore, it has been noted that bacterial biofilms may impair cutaneous wound healing and reduce topical antibacterial efficiency in healing or treating infected skin wounds. The diversity of P. aeruginosa cells within a biofilm is thought to make it harder to treat the infected lungs of people with cystic fibrosis. Early detection of biofilms in wounds is crucial to successful chronic wound management. Although many techniques have developed to identify planktonic bacteria in viable wounds, few have been able to quickly and accurately identify bacterial biofilms. Future studies are needed to find means of identifying and monitoring biofilm colonization at the bedside to permit timely initiation of treatment.

It has been shown that biofilms are present on the removed tissue of 80% of patients undergoing surgery for chronic sinusitis. The patients with biofilms were shown to have been denuded of cilia and goblet cells, unlike the controls without biofilms who had normal cilia and goblet cell morphology. Biofilms were also found on samples from two of 10 healthy controls mentioned. The species of bacteria from intraoperative cultures did not correspond to the bacteria species in the biofilm on the respective patient's tissue. In other words, the cultures were negative though the bacteria were present. New staining techniques are being developed to differentiate bacterial cells growing in living animals, e.g. from tissues with allergy-inflammations.

Research has shown that sub-therapeutic levels of β-lactam antibiotics induce biofilm formation in Staphylococcus aureus. This sub-therapeutic level of antibiotic may result from the use of antibiotics as growth promoters in agriculture, or during the normal course of antibiotic therapy. The biofilm formation induced by low-level methicillin was inhibited by DNase, suggesting that the sub-therapeutic levels of antibiotic also induce extracellular DNA release.

=== Pseudomonas aeruginosa ===
P. aeruginosa represents a commonly used biofilm model organism since it is involved in different types of biofilm-associated chronic infections. Examples of such infections include chronic wounds, chronic otitis media, chronic prostatitis and chronic lung infections in cystic fibrosis (CF) patients. About 80% of CF patients have chronic lung infection, caused mainly by P. aeruginosa growing in a non-surface attached biofilms surround by PMN. The infection remains present despite aggressive antibiotic therapy and is a common cause of death in CF patients due to constant inflammatory damage to the lungs. In patients with CF, one therapy for treating early biofilm development is to employ DNase to structurally weaken the biofilm.

Biofilm formation of P. aeruginosa, along with other bacteria, is found in 90% of chronic wound infections, which leads to poor healing and high cost of treatment estimated at more than US$25 billion every year in the United States. In order to minimize the P. aeruginosa infection, host epithelial cells secrete antimicrobial peptides, such as lactoferrin, to prevent the formation of the biofilms.

=== Streptococcus pneumoniae ===
Streptococcus pneumoniae is the main cause of community-acquired pneumonia and meningitis in children and the elderly, and of sepsis in HIV-infected persons. When S. pneumoniae grows in biofilms, genes are specifically expressed that respond to oxidative stress and induce competence. Formation of a biofilm depends on competence stimulating peptide (CSP). CSP also functions as a quorum-sensing peptide. It not only induces biofilm formation, but also increases virulence in pneumonia and meningitis.

It has been proposed that competence development and biofilm formation is an adaptation of S. pneumoniae to survive the defenses of the host. In particular, the host's polymorphonuclear leukocytes produce an oxidative burst to defend against the invading bacteria, and this response can kill bacteria by damaging their DNA. Competent S. pneumoniae in a biofilm have the survival advantage that they can more easily take up transforming DNA from nearby cells in the biofilm to use for recombinational repair of oxidative damages in their DNA. Competent S. pneumoniae can also secrete an enzyme (murein hydrolase) that destroys non-competent cells (fratricide) causing DNA to be released into the surrounding medium for potential use by the competent cells.

The insect antimicrobial peptide cecropin A can destroy planktonic and sessile biofilm-forming uropathogenic E. coli cells, either alone or when combined with the antibiotic nalidixic acid, synergistically clearing infection in vivo (in the insect host Galleria mellonella) without off-target cytotoxicity. The multi-target mechanism of action involves outer membrane permeabilization followed by biofilm disruption triggered by the inhibition of efflux pump activity and interactions with extracellular and intracellular nucleic acids.

=== Escherichia coli ===
Escherichia coli biofilms are responsible for many intestinal infectious diseases. The Extraintestinal group of E. coli (ExPEC) is the dominant bacterial group that attacks the urinary system, which leads to urinary tract infections. The biofilm formation of these pathogenic E. coli is hard to eradicate due to the complexity of its aggregation structure, and it has a significant contribution to developing aggressive medical complications, increase in hospitalization rate, and cost of treatment. The development of E. coli biofilm is a common leading cause of urinary tract infections (UTI) in hospitals through its contribution to developing medical device-associated infections. Catheter-associated urinary tract infections (CAUTI) represent the most common hospital-acquired infection due to the formation of the pathogenic E. coli biofilm inside the catheters.

=== Staphylococcus aureus ===
Staphylococcus aureus pathogen can attack skin and lungs, leading to skin infection and pneumonia. Moreover, the biofilm infections network of S. aureus plays a critical role in preventing immune cells, such as macrophages from eliminating and destroying bacterial cells. Furthermore, biofilm formation by bacteria, such as S. aureus, not only develops resistance against antibiotic medication but also develop internal resistance toward antimicrobial peptides (AMPs), leading to preventing the inhibition of the pathogen and maintaining its survival.

=== Serratia marcescens ===
Serratia marcescens is a fairly common opportunistic pathogen that can form biofilms on various surfaces, including medical devices such as catheters and implants, as well as natural environments like soil and water. The formation of biofilms by S. marcescens is a serious concern because of its ability to adhere to and colonize surfaces, protecting itself from host immune responses and antimicrobial agents. This strength makes infections caused by S. marcescens challenging to treat, specifically in hospitals where the bacterium can cause severe, and specific, infections.

Research suggests that biofilm formation by S. marcescens is a process controlled by both nutrient cues and the quorum-sensing system. Quorum sensing influences the bacterium's ability to adhere to surfaces and establish mature biofilms, whereas the availability of specific nutrients can enhance or inhibit biofilm development.

S. marcescens creates biofilms that ultimately develop into a highly porous, thread-like structure composed of chains of cells, filaments, and cell clusters. Research has shown that S. marcescens biofilms exhibit complex structural organization, including the formation of microcolonies and channels that facilitate nutrient and waste exchange. The production of extracellular polymeric substances (EPS) is a key factor in biofilm development, contributing to the bacterium's adhesion and resistance to antimicrobial agents. In addition to its role in healthcare-associated infections, S. marcescens biofilms have been implicated in the deterioration of industrial equipment and processes. For example, biofilm growth in cooling towers can lead to biofouling and reduced efficiency.

Efforts to control and prevent biofilm formation by S. marcescens involve the use of antimicrobial coatings on medical devices, the development of targeted biofilm disruptors, and improved sterilization protocols. Further research into the molecular mechanisms governing S. marcescens biofilm formation and persistence is crucial for developing effective strategies to combat its associated risks. The use of indole compounds has been studied to be used as protection against biofilm formation.

== Uses and impact ==
=== In medicine ===
It is suggested that around two-thirds of bacterial infections in humans involve biofilms. Infections associated with the biofilm growth usually are challenging to eradicate. This is mostly due to the fact that mature biofilms display antimicrobial tolerance, and immune response evasions. Biofilms often form on the inert surfaces of implanted devices such as catheters, prosthetic cardiac valves and intrauterine devices. Some of the most difficult infections to treat are those associated with the use of medical devices.

The rapidly expanding worldwide industry for biomedical devices and tissue engineering related products is already at $180 billion per year, yet this industry continues to suffer from microbial colonization. No matter the sophistication, microbial infections can develop on all medical devices and tissue engineering constructs. 60–70% of hospital-acquired infections are associated with the implantation of a biomedical device. This leads to 2 million cases annually in the U.S., costing the healthcare system over $5 billion in additional healthcare expenses.

The level of antibiotic resistance in a biofilm is much greater than that of non-biofilm bacteria, and can be as much as 5,000 times greater. The extracellular matrix of biofilm is considered one of the leading factors that can reduce the penetration of antibiotics into a biofilm structure and contributes to antibiotic resistance. Further, it has been demonstrated that the evolution of resistance to antibiotics may be affected by the biofilm lifestyle. Bacteriophage therapy can disperse the biofilm generated by antibiotic-resistant bacteria.

It has been shown that the introduction of a small current of electricity to the liquid surrounding a biofilm, together with small amounts of antibiotic can reduce the level of antibiotic resistance to levels of non-biofilm bacteria. This is termed the bioelectric effect. The application of a small DC current on its own can cause a biofilm to detach from its surface. A study showed that the type of current used made no difference to the bioelectric effect.

=== In industry ===
Microbial biofilms have many industrial applications such as the detoxification of environmental pollutants and wastewater treatments. Through these biogeochemical processes, complex and versatile microbial structures serve as an efficient way to detoxify organic pollutants and remove nutrients from waste waters. Biofilms can also be harnessed for constructive purposes. For example, many sewage treatment plants include a secondary treatment stage in which waste water passes over biofilms grown on filters, which extract and digest organic compounds. In such biofilms, bacteria are mainly responsible for removal of organic matter (BOD), while protozoa and rotifers are mainly responsible for removal of suspended solids (SS), including pathogens and other microorganisms. Slow sand filters rely on biofilm development in the same way to filter surface water from lake, spring or river sources for drinking purposes. What is regarded as clean water is effectively a waste material to these microcellular organisms. Biofilms can help eliminate petroleum oil from contaminated oceans or marine systems. The oil is eliminated by the hydrocarbon-degrading activities of communities of hydrocarbonoclastic bacteria (HCB). Biofilms are used in microbial fuel cells (MFCs) to generate electricity from a variety of starting materials, including complex organic waste and renewable biomass. Biofilms are also relevant for the improvement of metal dissolution in bioleaching industry, and aggregation of microplastics pollutants for convenient removal from the environment.

=== Food industry ===
Biofilms have become problematic in several food industries due to the ability to form on plants and during industrial processes. Bacteria can survive long periods of time in water, animal manure, and soil, causing biofilm formation on plants or in the processing equipment. The buildup of biofilms can affect the heat flow across a surface and increase surface corrosion and frictional resistance of fluids. These can lead to a loss of energy in a system and overall loss of products. Along with economic problems, biofilm formation on food poses a health risk to consumers due to the ability to make the food more resistant to disinfectants. As a result, from 1996 to 2010 the Centers for Disease Control and Prevention estimated 48 million foodborne illnesses per year.

In produce, microorganisms attach to the surfaces and biofilms develop internally. During the washing process, biofilms resist sanitization and allow bacteria to spread across the produce, especially via kitchen utensils. This problem is also found in ready-to-eat foods, because the foods go through limited cleaning procedures before consumption. Due to the perishability of dairy products and limitations in cleaning procedures, resulting in the buildup of bacteria, dairy is susceptible to biofilm formation and contamination. The bacteria can spoil the products more readily and contaminated products pose a health risk to consumers. One species of bacteria that can be found in various industries and is a major cause of foodborne disease is Salmonella. Large amounts of Salmonella contamination can be found in the poultry processing industry as about 50% of Salmonella strains can produce biofilms on poultry farms. Salmonella increases the risk of foodborne illnesses when the poultry products are not cleaned and cooked correctly. Salmonella is also found in the seafood industry where biofilms form from seafood borne pathogens on the seafood itself as well as in water. Shrimp products are commonly affected by Salmonella because of unhygienic processing and handling techniques. The preparation practices of shrimp and other seafood products can allow for bacteria buildup on the products.

New forms of cleaning procedures are being tested to reduce biofilm formation in these processes which will lead to safer and more productive food processing industries. These new forms of cleaning procedures also have a profound effect on the environment, often releasing toxic gases into the groundwater reservoirs. As a response to the aggressive methods employed in controlling biofilm formation, there are a number of novel technologies and chemicals under investigation that can prevent either the proliferation or adhesion of biofilm-secreting microbes. Latest proposed biomolecules presenting marked anti-biofilm activity include a range of metabolites such as bacterial rhamnolipids and even plant- and animal-derived alkaloids.

=== In aquaculture ===
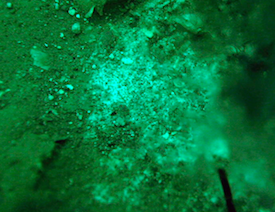
A biofilm from the Dead Sea

In shellfish and algal aquaculture, biofouling microbial species tend to block nets and cages and ultimately outcompete the farmed species for space and food. Bacterial biofilms start the colonization process by creating microenvironments that are more favorable for biofouling species. In the marine environment, biofilms could reduce the hydrodynamic efficiency of ships and propellers, lead to pipeline blockage and sensor malfunction, and increase the weight of appliances deployed in seawater. Numerous studies have shown that biofilm can be a reservoir for potentially pathogenic bacteria in freshwater aquaculture. Moreover, biofilms are important in establishing infections on the fish. As mentioned previously, biofilms can be difficult to eliminate even when antibiotics or chemicals are used in high doses. The role that biofilm plays as reservoirs of bacterial fish pathogens has not been explored in detail but it certainly deserves to be studied.

== Eukaryotic ==
Along with bacteria, biofilms are often initiated and produced by eukaryotic microbes. The biofilms produced by eukaryotes is usually occupied by bacteria and other eukaryotes alike, however the surface is cultivated and EPS is secreted initially by the eukaryote. Both fungi and microalgae are known to form biofilms in such a way. Biofilms of fungal origin are important aspects of human infection and fungal pathogenicity, as the fungal infection is more resistant to antifungals.

In the environment, fungal biofilms are an area of ongoing research. One key area of research is fungal biofilms on plants. For example, in the soil, plant associated fungi including mycorrhiza have been shown to decompose organic matter and protect plants from bacterial pathogens.

Biofilms in aquatic environments are often founded by diatoms. The exact purpose of these biofilms is unknown, however there is evidence that the EPS produced by diatoms facilitates both cold and salinity stress. These eukaryotes interact with a diverse range of other organisms within a region known as the phycosphere, but importantly are the bacteria associated with diatoms, as it has been shown that although diatoms excrete EPS, they only do so when interacting with certain bacteria species.

== Horizontal gene transfer ==
Horizontal gene transfer is the lateral transfer of genetic material between cellular organisms. It happens frequently in prokaryotes, and less frequently in eukaryotes. In bacteria, horizontal gene transfer can occur through transformation (uptake of free floating DNA in the environment), transduction (virus mediated DNA uptake), or conjugation (transfer of DNA between pili structures of two adjacent bacteria). Recent studies have also uncovered other mechanisms, such as membrane vesicle transmission or gene transfer agents. Biofilms promote horizontal gene transfer in a variety of ways.

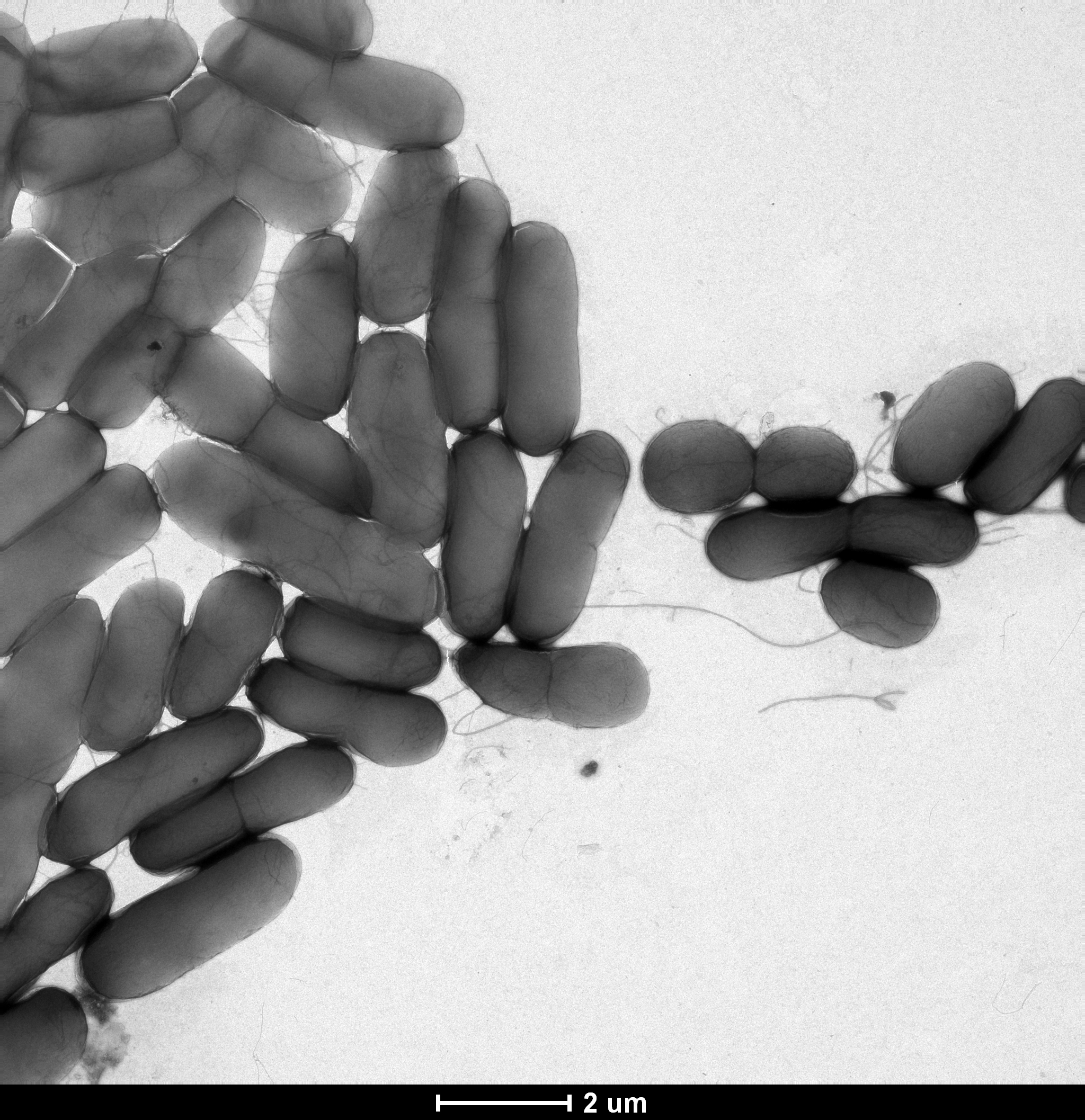
Transmission electron micrograph showing bacteria Escherichia coli that form extensive biofilms using a network of conjugative F-pili. Source: Jonasz Patkowski

Bacterial conjugation has been shown to accelerate biofilm formation in difficult environment due to the robust connections established by the conjugative pili. These connections can often foster cross-species transfer events due to the diverse heterogeneity of many biofilms. Additionally, biofilms are structurally confined by a polysaccharide matrix, providing the close spatial requirements for conjugation. Transformation is also frequently observed in biofilms. Bacterial autolysis is a key mechanism in biofilm structural regulation, providing an abundant source of competent DNA primed for transformative uptake. In some instances, inter-biofilm quorum sensing can enhance the competence of free floating eDNA, further promoting transformation. Stx gene transfer through bacteriophage carriers has been witnessed within biofilms, which suggests that biofilms are also a suitable environment for transduction. Membrane vesicles HGT occurs when released membrane vesicles (containing genetic information) fuse with a recipient bacteria, and release genetic material into the bacteria's cytoplasm. Recent research has revealed that membrane vesicle HGT can promote single-strain biofilm formation, yet the role membrane vesicle HGT plays in the formation of multistrain biofilms is still unknown. GTAs, or gene transfer agents, are phage-like particles produced by the host bacteria and contain random DNA fragments from the host bacteria genome. HGT within biofilms can confer antibiotic resistance or increased pathogenicity across the biofilms' population, promoting biofilm homeostasis.

=== Examples ===
Conjugative plasmids may encode biofilm-associated proteins, such as PtgA, PrgB, or PrgC which promote cell adhesion (required for early biofilm formation). Genes encoding type III fimbriae are found in pOLA52 (Klebsiella pneumoniae plasmid) which promote conjugative-pilus-dependent biofilm formation.

Transformation commonly occurs within biofilms. A phenomenon called fratricide can be seen among streptococcal species in which cell-wall degrading enzymes are released, lysing neighboring bacteria and releasing their DNA. This DNA can then be taken up by the surviving bacteria (transformation). Competence stimulating peptides may play an important role in biofilm formation among S. pneumoniae and S. mutans as well. Among V. cholerae, the competence pilus itself promotes cell aggregation through pilus-pilus interactions at the beginning of biofilm formation.

Phage invasion may play a role in biofilm life cycles, lysing bacteria and releasing their eDNA, which strengthens biofilm structures and can be taken up by neighboring bacteria in transformation. Biofilm destruction caused by the E. coli phage Rac and the P. aeruginosa prophage Pf4 causes detachment of cells from the biofilm. Detachment is a biofilm phenomenon which requires more study, but is hypothesized to proliferate the bacterial species that comprise the biofilm.

Membrane vesicle HGT has been witnessed occurring in marine environments, among Neisseria gonorrhoeae, Pseudomonas aeruginosa, Helicobacter pylori, and among many other bacterial species. Even though membrane vesicle HGT has been shown as a contributing factor in biofilm formation, research is still required to prove that membrane vesicle mediated HGT occurs within biofilms. Membrane vesicle HGT has also been shown to modulate phage-bacteria interactions in Bacillus subtilis SPP1 phage-resistant cells (lacking the SPP1 receptor protein). Upon exposure to vesicles containing receptors, transduction of pBT163 (a cat-encoding plasmid) occurs, resulting in the expression of the SPP1 receptor protein, opening the receptive bacteria to future phage infection.

Recent research has shown that the archaeal species H. volcanii has some biofilm phenotypes similar to bacterial biofilms such as differentiation and HGT, which required cell-cell contact and involved formation of cytosolic bridges and cellular fusion events.

== Cultivation devices ==
There is a wide variety of biofilm cultivation devices to mimic natural or industrial environments. Although it is important to consider that the particular experimental platform for biofilm research determines what kind of biofilm is cultivated and the data that can be extracted. These devices can be grouped into the following:

- microtiter plate (MTP) systems and MBEC Assay® [formerly the Calgary Biofilm Device (CBD)]
- BioFilm Ring Test (BRT) or clinical Biofilm Ring Test (cBRT)
- Robbins Device or modified Robbins Device (such as the MPMR-10PMMA or the Bio-inLine Biofilm Reactor)
- Drip Flow Biofilm Reactor®
- rotary devices (such as the CDC Biofilm Reactor®, the Rotating Disk Reactor, the Biofilm Annular Reactor, the Industrial Surfaces Biofilm Reactor, or the Constant Depth Film Fermenter)
- flow chambers or flow cells (such as the Coupon Evaluation Flow Cell, Transmission Flow Cell, and Capillary Flow Cell from BioSurface Technologies)
- microfluidic approaches, such as 3D-bacterial "biofilm-dispersal-then-recolonization" (BDR) microfluidic model

== Quantification methods ==
Biofilms are commonly quantified using a variety of methods that measure either total biomass, viable cells, metabolic activity, or structural characteristics. Among the most widely used techniques is the Crystal violet assay, developed by Gerald D Christensen from the University of Rochester, colorimetric method that stains the total attached biomass, including both microbial cells and the extracellular polymeric matrix, in microtiter plates.

The Syal method is a microplate-based assay for biofilm quantification that has been reported to quantify both surface-attached biofilms and biofilms formed at the air–liquid interface, addressing a limitation of the conventional crystal violet assay in certain experimental systems. It was developed by Kirtimaan Syal from BITS Pilani to address the latter limitation.

== See also ==
- Amyloid – Insoluble protein aggregate with a fibrillar morphology
- Bacterial nanowires – Electrically conductive appendages produced by a number of bacteria
- Biofilm factory
- Biofilm prevention – Stopping microbes attaching to a surface
- Biomineralization – Process by which living organisms produce minerals
- Center for Biofilm Engineering
- Curli – Proteinaceous extracellular fiber produced by enteric bacteria
- Floc (biofilm) – Type of microbial aggregate suspension
- Microbial intelligence – Adaptive behavior by microscopic organisms including bacteria and protists
- Microbial mat – Multi-layered sheet of microorganisms
- Phage therapy – Therapeutic use of bacteriophages to treat bacterial infections
- Phototrophic biofilm – Microbial communities including microorganisms which use light as their energy source
- Stromatolite – Layered encrusted sedimentary structure of bacterial origin
