= Cis-2-Decenoic acid =

cis-2-Decenoic acid

Names
- Preferred IUPAC name (2Z)-Dec-2-enoic acid

Identifiers
CAS Number	15790-91-7
3D model (JSmol)	Interactive image
Beilstein Reference	1721990
ChEBI	CHEBI:50466
ChemSpider	4512229
ECHA InfoCard	100.229.919
EC Number	223-475-8
PubChem CID	5356596
CompTox Dashboard (EPA)	DTXSID40418140
- InChI: InChI=1S/C10H18O2/c1-2-3-4-5-6-7-8-9-10(11)12/h8-9H,2-7H2,1H3,(H,11,12)/b9-8- Key: WXBXVVIUZANZAU-HJWRWDBZSA-N
- SMILES: O=C(O)\C=C/CCCCCCC

Properties
Chemical formula	C_{10}H_{18}O_{2}
Molar mass	170.252 g·mol^{−1}
Boiling point	102–103 °C (216–217 °F; 375–376 K) at 0.5 mmHg

Hazards
- GHS labelling
Pictograms	(GHS07: Exclamation mark)
Signal word	Warning
Hazard statements	H315, H319
Precautionary statements	P264, P280, P302+P352, P305+P351+P338, P321, P332+P313, P337+P313, P362
- Except where otherwise noted, data are given for materials in their standard state (at 25 °C [77 °F], 100 kPa). Infobox references

cis-2-Decenoic acid is an unsaturated fatty acid. It is a colorless oil.

== Preparation and occurrence ==
The compound can be prepared from 1-iodonon-1-ene by lithium halogen exchange followed by carbonation.

cis-2-Decenoic acid is produced by Pseudomonas aeruginosa. It may have potential in fighting biofilm implied in infectious diseases that are present in more than 60% of Hospital-acquired infection.
