= Application of biofilms in industry =

Application of biofilms in industry examines how biofilms are put to use in industry, even though they are often treated as something to be removed in other contexts. Biofilm-based systems can require less space and improve efficiency relative to traditional industrial methods.

== Introduction ==
Many microorganisms can naturally grow together on surfaces to form complex aggregations in thick layers called biofilms. There has been a great effort to develop efficient methods for biofilm removal or prevention in clinical and food manufacturing processes. On the other hand, current research suggested that biofilms can be useful for constructive purposes such as a template of new materials that may find applications in the industry. One distinctive characteristic of biofilm formation is that microorganisms within biofilms are often much tougher and more resistant to environmental stress compared to individual microorganisms. Despite the biofilms being highly dynamic in nature, the cells inside the aggregate are stationary and are able to adapt to adverse environments. This phenomenon of enhanced resistance can be beneficial in industrial chemical production where microorganisms within biofilms may tolerate higher chemical concentration and act as robust biorefineries for various products. These microbes have also been used in bioremediation to remove contaminants from freshwater and wastewater. More novel uses of biofilms include generating electricity using microbial fuel cells. Challenges to scaling up this technology include cost, controlling the growth of biofilms, and membrane fouling.

== Bioremediation ==
Biofilms can consist of a multitude of bacteria, fungi, and algae which are able to absorb, immobilize, and degrade many common pollutants found in wastewater. By harnessing a natural phenomenon, biofilm-mediated remediation is an environmentally friendly method for environmental cleanup. Currently, activated sludge is a common wastewater treatment process. However, biofilm-based wastewater treatment systems often use less space, are more consistent, and produce less sludge.

Biofilms contain a high amount of extracellular polymeric substance (EPS) which is made up of polysaccharides, proteins, DNA, and phospholipids. These are secreted by microbes and contribute to the stability and density of biofilms. This helps to immobilize microbes and pollutants from the water. Heavy metals— such as lead, copper, manganese, magnesium, zinc, cadmium, iron, and nickel—form complexes with negatively charged functional groups in the EPS and become trapped. Recent studies also employ biofilms to trap and aggregate difficult-to-remove microplastics for convenient removal from the polluted environment. A carrier made of some support material is usually present in the reactor designed as a place for the biofilm to grow.

Microorganisms in biofilms are more limited in nutrients since they must rely on diffusion for nutrient transport as compared to conventional transport for free floating microbes. This leads to more EPS being secreted in the biofilms. Some bacterial cells in a heavy metal environment may also respond to the stress by forming and maintaining biofilms. Both of these effects help further remove contaminants from the water. Biofilms can also be used for early monitoring of environmental pollution to isolate, identify, and quantify contaminants in wastewater and waterways.

Current challenges for biofilm-mediated bioremediation include difficulties in controlling the structure of the biofilm and, in particular, its thickness and porosity. Furthermore, the pH and other conditions of the water may be less than optimal for biofilm growth. Researchers are working on engineering microbial biofilms, particularly the microorganisms in them, to overcome these limitations.

=== Membrane biofilm reactors (MBR) ===
While membrane bioreactors filter out flocs in activated sludge, membrane biofilm reactors feed gas —such as O_{2}, H_{2}, and CH_{4}—to promote biofilm growth on the surface of hydrophobic membranes. The biofilm grows on a fixed surface rather than in a suspension. These reactors have the potential to efficiently remove micropollutants from wastewater. This includes suspended solids, pathogens, and organic compounds increasingly found in agricultural, industrial, hospital, and household wastewater. Some challenges of this technology include the permeability of the membrane, membrane fouling, and removal of antibiotics.

=== Membrane Aerated Biofilm Reactors (MABR) ===
The membrane-aerated biofilm reactor (MABR) are a biological wastewater treatment technology designed to address aeration limitations in conventional biological treatment systems. This technology employs gas-permeable membranes to deliver oxygen directly to biofilms that develop on the membrane surface. MABRs achieve bubbleless oxygen transfer with enhanced transfer rates, resulting in significant reductions in energy consumption and operational costs. A distinctive characteristic of MABRs is their counter-diffusion mechanism, which generates stratified biofilm architectures that enable simultaneous nitrification and denitrification processes within a single reactor unit. While functioning, ammonia is oxidized to nitrate anions through nitrification, while organic matter is oxidized to carbon dioxide. Under anoxic conditions, nitrate is further reduced to nitrogen gas through denitrification, resulting in the removal of nitrogen from the wastewater. This process allows for a removal of organic impurities, from the liquid inlet.

MABRs can reduce aeration energy demand and reactor footprint compared to conventional activated sludge systems. However, MABRs are susceptible to fouling during their operation. If the flowrates of electron donors and electron acceptors are not balanced, sulphate reduction may occur, producing hydrogen sulphide, which may diffuse into the aerobic layers, reducing the production of the nitrate anions. If iron ions are present in the liquid stream, iron sulphide may form, contributing to fouling as it coats the biofilm. To properly manage the inlet and outlet concentrations of electron donors and electron acceptors to the MABR, a control system is required.

=== Anaerobic biofilm reactors ===
Producing dairy products is a water-intensive process and generates large amounts of wastewater from washing equipment and from by-products. In particular, this wastewater has many suspended, colloidal, and dissolved particles including lactose, proteins, and lipids. One method for treating dairy wastewater is using anaerobic biofilm reactors. The biofilm grows on a support material which can be made of seashell, natural stones, charcoal, and plastic materials, amongst other sources. These anaerobic filters, however, can be clogged due to the high fat content of dairy wastewater. To combat the accumulation of volatile fatty acids on these filters, researchers have looked at pre-treating the wastewater.

=== Moving-bed biofilm reactors ===
In moving-bed biofilm reactors, biofilms grow on small plastic or sponge-based carriers that circulate in the bioreactors using aeration or mechanical stirring. This allows for high contact between contaminants in the wastewater and adding more carriers can increase the rate of biodegradation. However, this also requires an increase in stirring or aeration and thus an increase in energy usage. This technology in particular has been used in industry as an alternative to conventional activated sludge processes in order to remove organic matter and nutrients, such as carbon, nitrogen, and phosphorus.

=== Algal biofilm reactors ===
Algal biofilm reactors can be used for wastewater treatment and biofuel production. Traditionally, algal biofuel production has high operating costs but can be combined with wastewater treatment to be more economical. The high concentrations of nitrogen and phosphate often found in wastewater are excellent nutrients for microalgae. As microalgae proliferate, they degrade the organic contaminants in the wastewater. This microalgae can then be harvested and used in biofuel production. For municipal wastewater treatment, these reactors can be vertical, horizontal, flow lane, or rotating. Biofilm consisting of microalgae cells grow on supports made of nylon, polyethylene, cotton, or other materials. In terms of biofuel production, algal biofilm reactors are an alternative to current algal bioreactors or open raceway ponds where algal biomass grows in suspension. It potentially increases cell culture density, thus using less water and land. There are still challenges with controlling conditions to optimize microalgae growth and potential contamination of wastewater with pathogens. The amount of light, CO_{2} supply, and removal of O_{2} is also important for promoting growth of microalgae since it relies on photosynthesis. The wastewater may also need to be pretreated by, for example, adding other nutrients like carbon and silicon.

=== 3D Biofilm electrode reactors ===
Current bioelectrochemical systems for treatment of complex wastewater (e.g. contains dye, antibiotics, heavy metals) by inducing redox reactions can be time-intensive and have limited mass transfer. Electrodes can become corroded, depending on the makeup of the water, and an accumulation of solids can lead to biofouling thus reducing the efficiency of the electrode. 3D biofilm electrode reactors are a novel technology that adds conductive particles between electrodes to increase contact of microorganisms with pollutants. This results in higher mass transfer and promotes electrocatalysis where microbes on the electrodes degrade the contaminants in the water. It is still unclear the cost of this technology and how it can handle varying conditions of wastewater (e.g. electrical conductivity, concentration of salt, pH).

== Chemical Production ==
Biofilms are also being considered for producing bulk chemicals using biofilm fermentation, which is a type of biorefinery. Some products such as high-fructose corn syrup and the commodity chemical acrylamide are manufactured using immobilized biocatalysts. However, the method of immobilization can be expensive and the process can deactivate the biocatalyst leading to decreased activity over time. These factors can make it challenging to use immobilized biocatalysts to produce bulk chemicals and fuels that often have a low market price. Thus, biofilm fermentations have been considered as a way to increase the yield of organic acids and alcohols in a way that is more commercially feasible. Strains of bacteria that are known for producing the chemical of interest are grown on carriers that can be made from a variety of materials. For example, zymomonas mobilis and Saccharomyces cerevisiae on plastic and plastic-composite supports have been investigated for increasing ethanol yield. Research has also been conducted for synthesizing butanol, lactic acid, acetone, and more. At commercial scale, acetic acid bacteria in a trickle bed biofilm reactor has been used to produce vinegar.

Due to the structure of biofilms, there are mass transfer limitations that lead to gradients in nutrient and product concentrations, pH, and temperature. Thus, bacterial subpopulations develop which can reduce the amount of bacteria actively producing the chemical of interest thereby decreasing product yield. This can also be impacted by bioreactors that are not properly sterilized, leading to impure cultures. For some low-value bulk chemicals that do not require sterile conditions, this feature can be taken advantage of by using a mix of microbes which may improve the overall yield.

Biofilm reactors often have longer startup periods as it may take several days for the bacteria to attach onto the carriers. Furthermore, it may take several weeks or even months for a sufficient amount of biomass to accumulate. By contrast, excessive biomass growth can also clog bioreactors, leading to downtime for maintenance and a loss in profit. Process operation and control can also be challenging for the dynamic environment of the bioreactors.

=== Electrochemically active biofilms ===
Electrically active microorganisms create electrochemically active biofilms (EABs) which have been used in microbial fuel cells to generate an electric current. These fuel cells have also been paired with wastewater treatment by taking advantage of the many biodegradable organic components in wastewater. It has been considered as an alternative to conventional wastewater treatment methods, or as a step before the membrane reactor, or to reduce the amount of solid sludge produced. Researchers have looked at treating dairy, animal carcass, brewery, winery, and domestic wastewater, to name a few, with microbial fuel cells. This technology, however, has yet to be fully successful on a large scale due to low power density and the fluctuating temperature and composition of real wastewater. EABs have also been looked at to produce hydrogen, which is currently produced from mostly non-renewable fossil fuels. In the new technology of microbial electrolysis cells, EABs on the anode break down organic substrates to CO_{2}, electrons, and protons. Furthermore, EABs have been used for the synthesis of metal nanoparticles and metal semiconductor composites as an alternative to traditional chemical methods.
