= Terrace garden =

Garden with a raised flat section

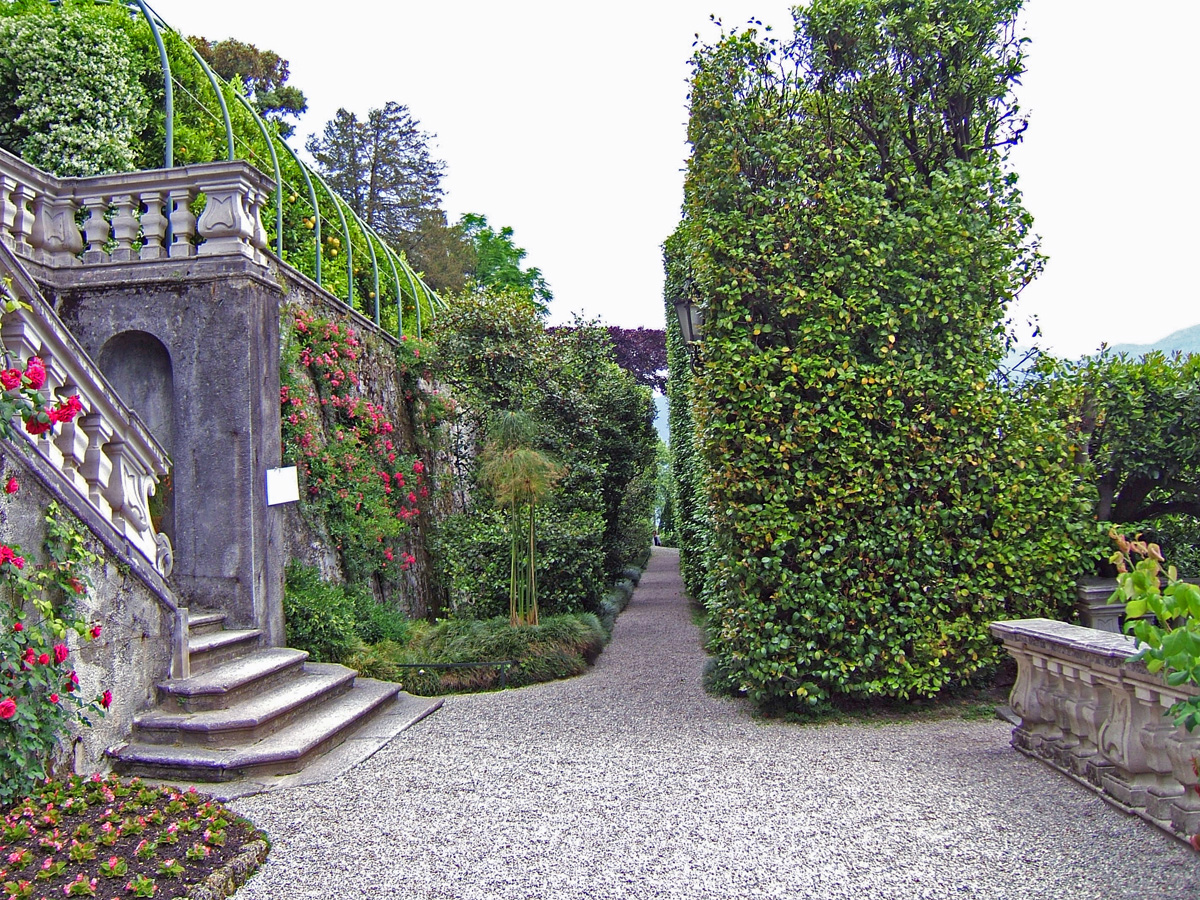
Transverse view along a narrow terrace, Villa Carlotta on Lake Como, Tremezzo, Italy: stairs from an upper level are inset into the retaining wall.

A terrace garden is a garden with a raised flat paved or gravelled section overlooking a prospect. A raised terrace keeps a house dry and provides a transition between the hardscape and the softscape.

== History ==
=== Persia ===
Since a level site is generally regarded as a requisite for comfort and repose, the terrace as a raised viewing platform made an early appearance in the ancient Persian gardening tradition, where the enclosed orchard, or paradise, was to be viewed from a ceremonial tent. Such a terrace had its origins in the far older agricultural practice of terracing a sloping site (see Terrace (agriculture)). The Hanging Gardens of Babylon must have been built on an artificial mountain with stepped terraces, like those on a ziggurat.

=== Ancient Rome ===
Lucullus brought back to Rome first-hand experience of Persian gardening in the hilly sites of Asia Minor; the villa gardens of Maecenas, which included libraries open to scholars, incurred the disdain of Seneca. At Praeneste during the early Imperial period, the sanctuary of Fortuna was enlarged and elaborated, the natural slope being shaped into a series of terraces linked by stairs.

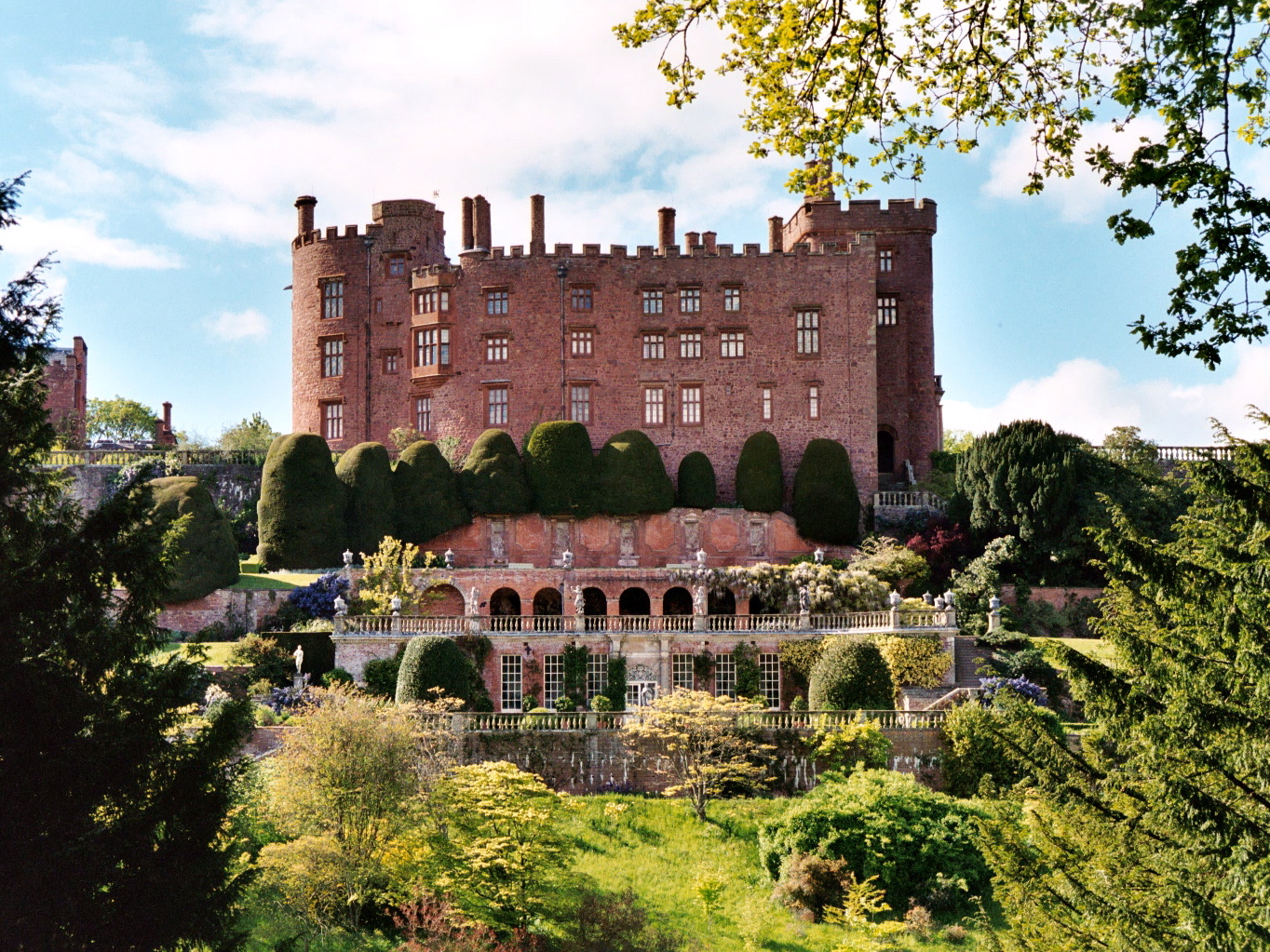
Steep ground at Powys Castle, Mid Wales, falls away in a series of terraces, some supported on vaulted undercrofts.

The imperial villas at Capri were built to take advantage of varied terraces. At the seaside Villa of the Papyri in Herculaneum, the villa gardens of Julius Caesar's father-in-law fell away in a series of terraces, giving pleasant and varied views of the Bay of Naples. Only some of them have been excavated. At Villa of Livia, probably part of Livia Drusilla's dowry brought to the Julio-Claudian dynasty, rooms in the cryptoporticus beneath terracing were frescoed with trees in bloom and fruit.

=== Italian Renaissance ===
During the Italian Renaissance, the formalized, civilizing imprint of human control over wild nature expressed in terracing that was combined with stairs and water features, drew villa patrons and garden designers to escarpments that surveyed a handsome prospect. At the influential Cortile del Belvedere at the Vatican Palace, perfected under a series of popes from the earliest 16th century, the backdrop within the enclosed court was a raised terrace. The view in this case was from the Stanze of Raphael on an upper floor of the Palace.

=== English landscape garden ===
Even in the most naturalistic landscape gardens of Capability Brown, a raised gravelled or paved terrace along the garden front offered a dry walk in damp weather and a transition between the hard materials of the architecture and the rolling greensward beyond.

== Contemporary ==
Contemporary terrace gardens, in addition to being in the garden and landscape, often occur in urban areas and are terrace architecture elements that extend out from an apartment or residence at any floor level other than ground level. They are often discussed in conjunction with roof gardens, although they are not always actual roof gardens, instead being balconies and decks. These outdoor spaces can become lush gardens through the use of container gardening, automated drip irrigation and low-flow irrigation systems, and outdoor furnishings.

== See also ==
- Patio
- Balcony
- Terrace (building)
