= Pile Cloth Media Filtration =

Filtration process for water and wastewater treatment

Pile Cloth Media Filtration is a mechanical process for the separation of organic and inorganic solids from liquids. It belongs to the processes of surface filtration and cake filtration where, in addition to the sieve effect, real filtration effects occur over the depth of the pile layer. Pile Cloth Media Filtration represents a branch of cloth filtration processes and is used for water and wastewater treatment in medium and large scale. In Pile Cloth Media Filtration, three-dimensional textile fabrics (pile cloth) are used as filter media. During the filter cleaning of the pile layer the filtration process continues and is not interrupted.

== History and development ==
In the 1970s the Swiss company Mecana S.A. began the development of cloth filtration. The initially applied needle felt has fundamentally evolved since through the use of pile cloth media as filter media. Needle felt – needle-punched random fiber nonwoven fabric consisting of a large number of small fibers – were gradually replaced by woven pile cloth media. Three-dimensional fabrics – developed from a paint roller material – has emerged today to a technically designed filter medium, the so-called pile cloth media. The difference to needle felt is mainly in the flexible structure, so that with pile layers the removal of the retained substances during filter cleaning is much more effective.

The world's first Pile Cloth Media Filtration system was installed in 1997 in Weinfelden (Switzerland) as a disc filter for the treatment of paper mill wastewater by the Swiss Company Mecana.

Since 2005, pile cloth media filters with a vertical axis have come into use.

Together with the US company Aqua-Aerobic Systems, Inc., Mecana introduced interchangeable and profiled suction lips in 2016 and 2018.

== Filter media ==
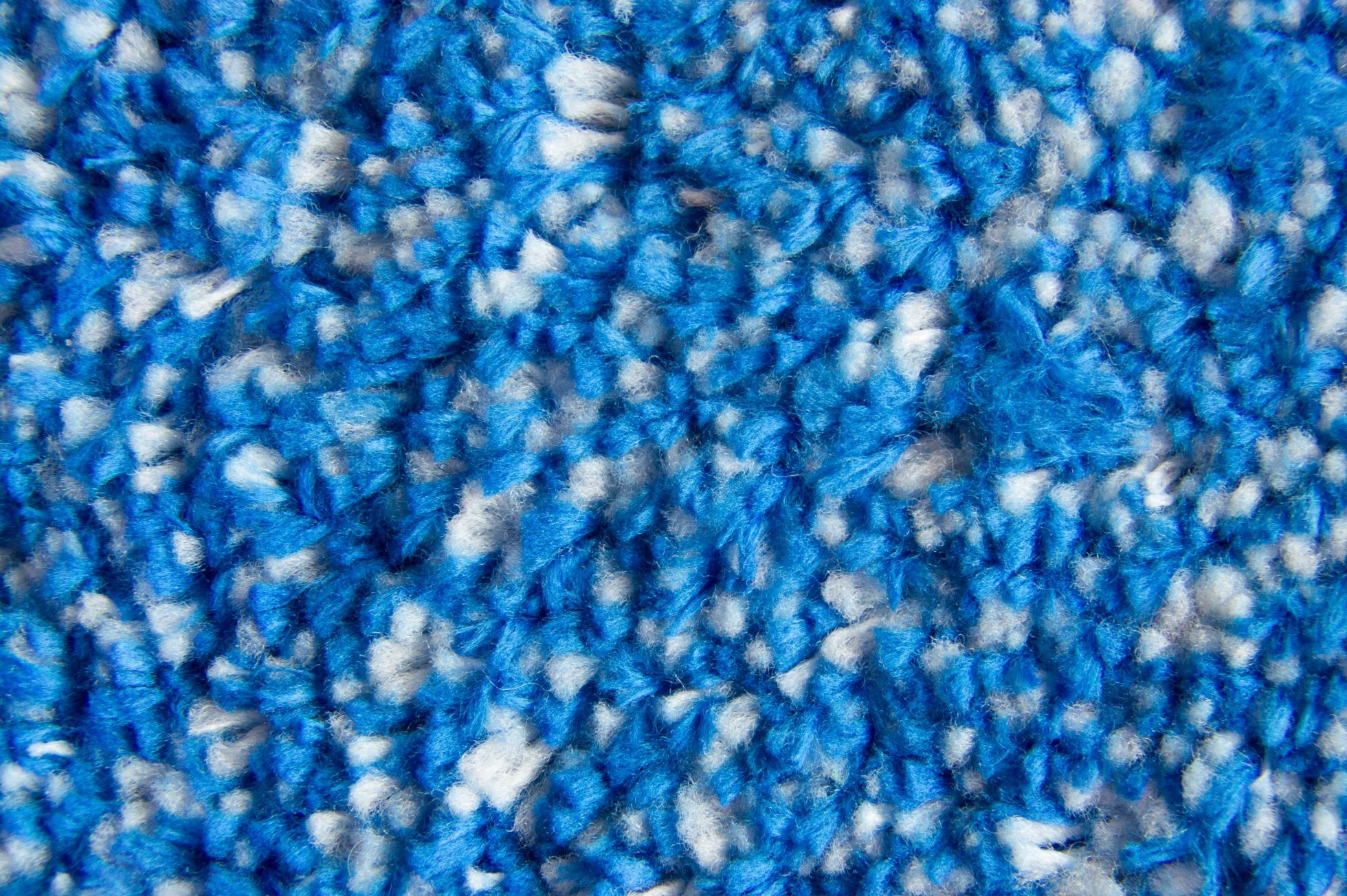
Pile cloth fabric applied as filter medium for water and wastewater treatment

Today, woven pile cloth media are used as filter media, which is the reason for the name of the process. Woven pile clothes have a multidimensional structure consisting of a filter-active fluidizable pile layer and a non-filter-active backing. The backing, made of continuous filament with large non-filter-active pores, serves as a support for the pile layer, which is composed of multiple superimposed filaments or fibers woven into the backing. The solids retention of the pile cloth media is determined only by the pile layer. The finer the individual filaments of the pile layer, the higher the solids retention and the smaller the particles that can be separated. Pile cloth media can be defined, among other parameters, by the length of the erected pile [mm], the diameter of the individual filaments [μm], the specific surface area of the pile layer [m²/m²], the specific weight per unit area of the pile cloth media [g/m²] and the size of the flow-relevant pores [mm] of the backing. A defined pore size for pile cloth media or the pile layer does not exist by definition.

Effective cleaning of the pile layer is essential for continuous operation. Depending on the application, conventional standard fibers, microfibers or ultrafibers are used. Common materials applied for pile layers are polyester (PES) and polyamide (PA).

Pile cloth media are subject to system-related mechanical stress caused by filter cleaning. However, significant wear of the pile fiber layer has not been detected. The service life of the pile fabrics is influenced by the application and the corresponding fouling behavior of the backing. Suction cleaning of the pile layer does not prevent biofouling or scaling on the backing, which result in an increase in cloth resistance and shorter backwash intervals with time. Fewer cleaning cycles generally extend the lifetime of the pile cloth media until maintenance or replacement. The effluent quality is not affected by the aging process of the pile cloth media.

== Functionality and design variations ==
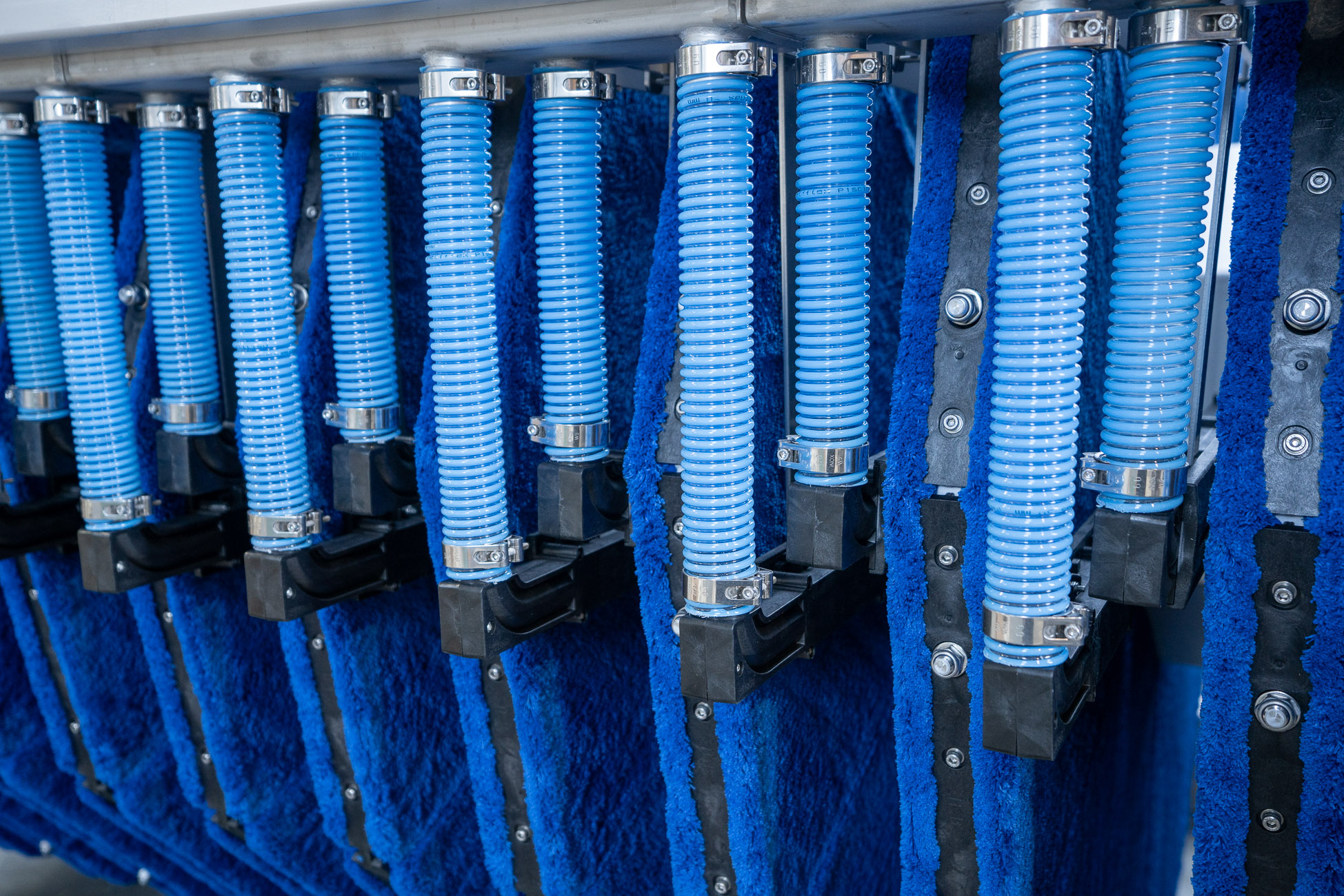
Disc filter design with swing mounted backwash shoes

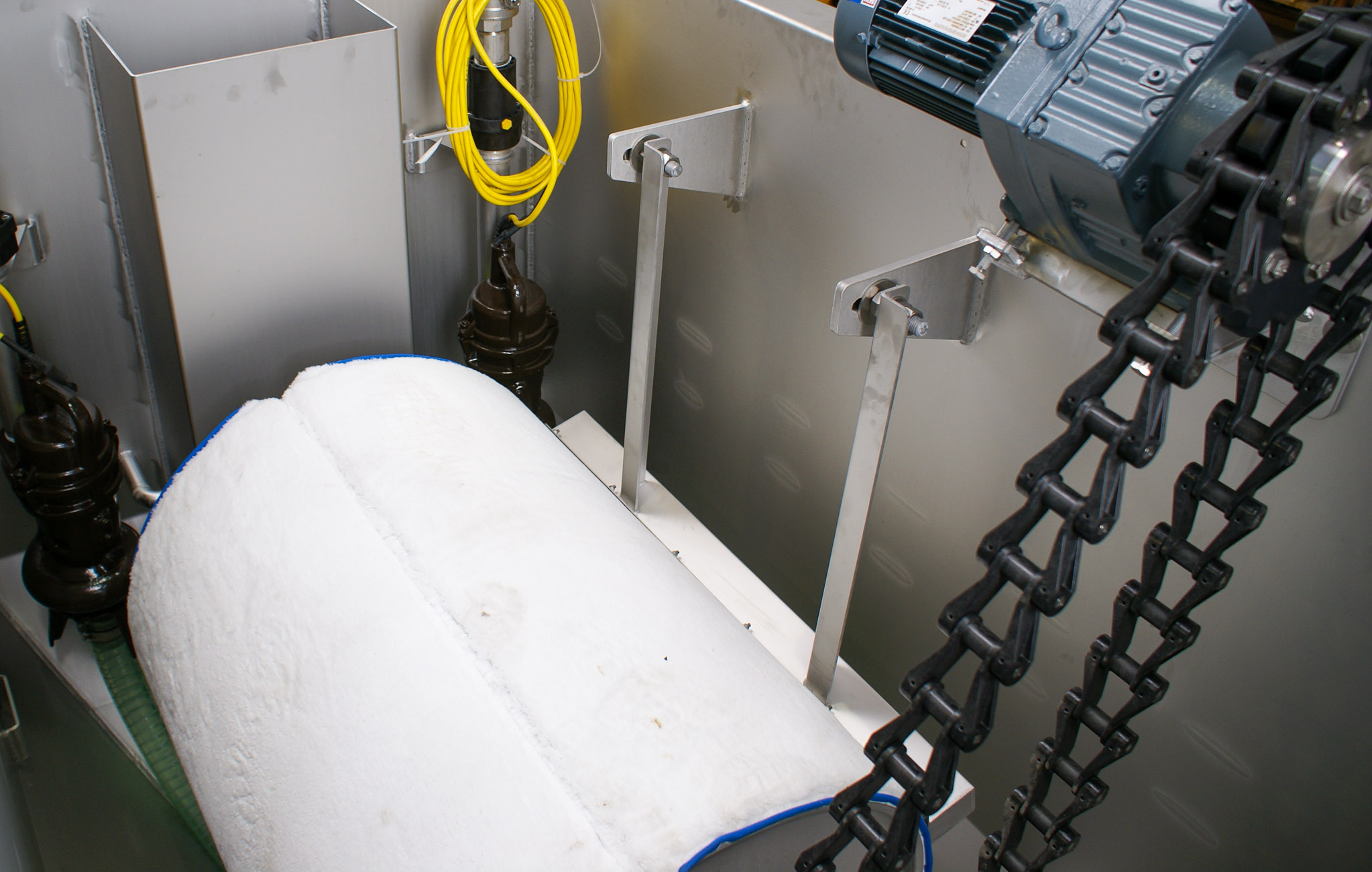
Drum filter design

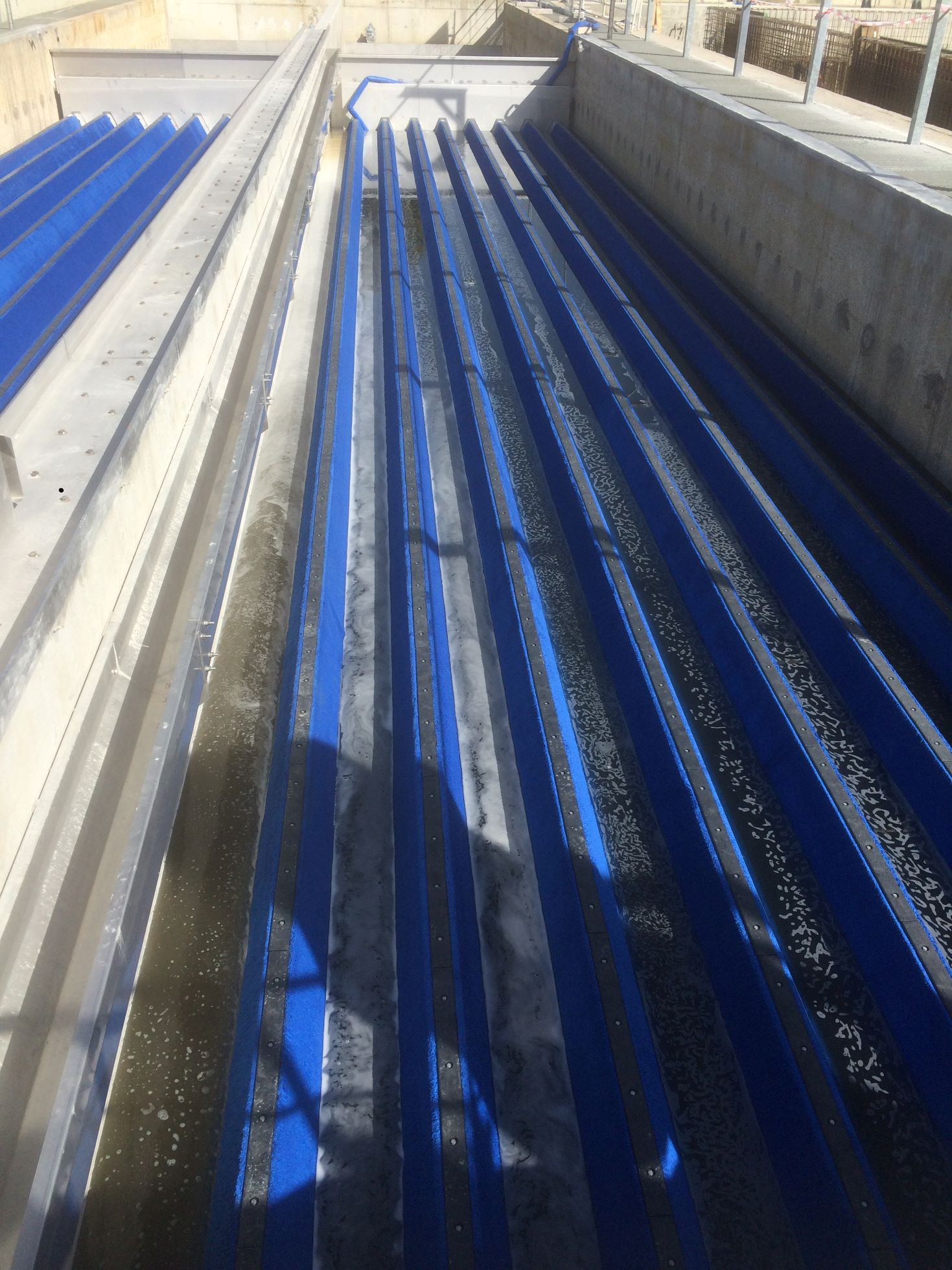
Diamond filter design with rhombic support structure

During filtration operation, suspended solids accumulate in the pile layer. With increasing solids retention by the pile layer, the hydraulic resistance increases, resulting in an increase of the water level or differential pressure. The pile cloth media is permanently and completely submerged during both filtration and filter cleaning, so that 100% of the filter surface is used.

Regular discharge of the accumulated solids is necessary. If the raw water level exceeds a certain level or differential pressure, filter cleaning is triggered. In this process, the solids layer formed on the outside is removed from the filter media by filter cleaning vacuum pump(s) applying differential pressure via suction bars in reverse flow direction (inside-out cleaning).

Cleaning is performed by rotating the filter disc/drum or by a static filter support with movable cleaning unit. Due to the negative pressure, the pile layer erects (fluidization), so that the solids are removed and vacuumed away. In normal operation mode, the pile layer lies flat against the backing, so that a filter cake is formed again. Due to biofouling or scaling on the backing, manual or chemical cleaning of the pile cloth media may also be necessary. During vacuum filter cleaning, filtration is not interrupted. Compared to sand filters or microstrainers, no additional backwash water is required for filter cleaning. A backwash water storage tank is therefore not required.

Pile Cloth Media Filters can be used in free-flow systems and closed pressure systems. The pile cloth media is mounted either on a disc or drum, which results in the different designs (disc filters and drum filters). Special designs include e.g. pressurized drum filters, diamond filters (grating support with rhombic cross-section) or plate filters. Disc filters are equipped with removable filter segments arranged around a central effluent tube. The cleaning system, consisting of a suction bar and a filter cleaning pump, is able to clean several discs simultaneously. Suction cleaning is also possible by a central pump and a valve per cleaning system.

Free-flow systems consist of a filter unit with inlet and outlet weir to hydraulically decouple the pile cloth filter machine from upstream and downstream processes. The filter machine is mounted in a filter tank and is usually equipped with inlet weir (with optional penstock regulation), outlet weir, emergency overflow and a level measurement. The raw water flows through the fully submerged filter construction from the outside to the inside (outside-in filtration) through the pile cloth media into the central effluent tube, retaining suspended solids. The filtrate then passes through the ascending pipe and the outlet weir. The zero water level corresponding to the height of the outlet weir serves as a reference for plant control. In closed systems, pressurized drum filters are used, whereby the feed water also flows through the pile cloth media from the outside to the inside. The system is controlled here via tank pressure. While in free-flow systems the differential pressure is commonly up to 60 mbar, this may exceed 1 bar in pressurized drum filters.

== Process characteristics ==
The design is based on the pile cloth media and fluid specific solids loading capacity (σ) [g/m^{2}], solids surface loading rate (SLR) [g/m^{2}/h], filter velocity (v_{F}) [m/h] and solids content in the feed flow at average and maximum loading. The selection of pile cloth media depends on the effluent requirements and the solids content in the raw water. The pile cloth media properties and the efficiency of the suction cleaning system determine the SLR.

Due to a high achievable SLR of up to >800 g/m^{2}/h, Pile Cloth Media Filters are space-saving compared to many other separation processes (such as sedimentation, flotation, sand filters) and thus have a low footprint. Disc filters in particular have high specific filter surface areas of up to 9 m²/m². Due to the low hydraulic losses (max. ca. 50 cm), pile cloth media filters can be operated in a very energy-efficient and cost-effective way (depending on application, solids loading and number of cleaning intervals with approximately 0.3 to 20 Wh/m^{3} treated water).

The maximum filter velocity is determined by the filter design and is not limited by the filter media. In free-flow systems the maximum filter velocity generally can be up to 8 - 16 (20) m/h. Pressurized drum filters, on the other hand, can be operated with a maximum filter velocity of up to 60 m/h. The filter velocity has no direct influence on the effluent quality.

Pile Cloth Media Filters are unaffected by peak loads. The backwash water quantity is directly proportional to the frequency of the cleaning cycles and depends on the pile cloth media used, the solids loading and the behaviour of the filtered substances. The amount of backwash water can be estimated by the number of filters, filter surface, cleaning duration and frequency. The characteristics of the sludge water depend on the backwash frequency, type and quantity of the retained solids.

== Applications ==
Pile Cloth Media Filters are used in municipal and industrial wastewater treatment, water reuse, road runoff and combined sewer treatment, drinking water treatment and desalination. Among other solids, algae, helminth eggs, microplastics, tire wear, phosphorus, powdered activated carbon, can be effectively removed depending on the application. The following are examples of potential application areas:

- Industrial wastewater treatment
- Combined sewer overflow
- Surface water and drinking water treatment
- Substitute for clarifiers in biofilm processes
- Tertiary filtration
- Phosphorus removal
- Primary filtration
- Road runoff
- Mircropollutant removal (retention of powdered activated carbon, pre-filtration before ozonation or granular activated carbon filters)
- Pre-/Post-Filtration for moving bed reactors
- Pre-Filtration before disinfection (e.g. UV or ozone applications)
- Water reuse (e.g. irrigation in agriculture, process water supply, ...)
- Pre-Filtration for desalination plants
- Pre-Filtration for cooling water or heat exchangers (e.g. heat recovery from wastewater or surface water)
- Stormwater treatment
- Algae harvesting
