= Micro-irrigation =

Low pressure and flow irrigation system

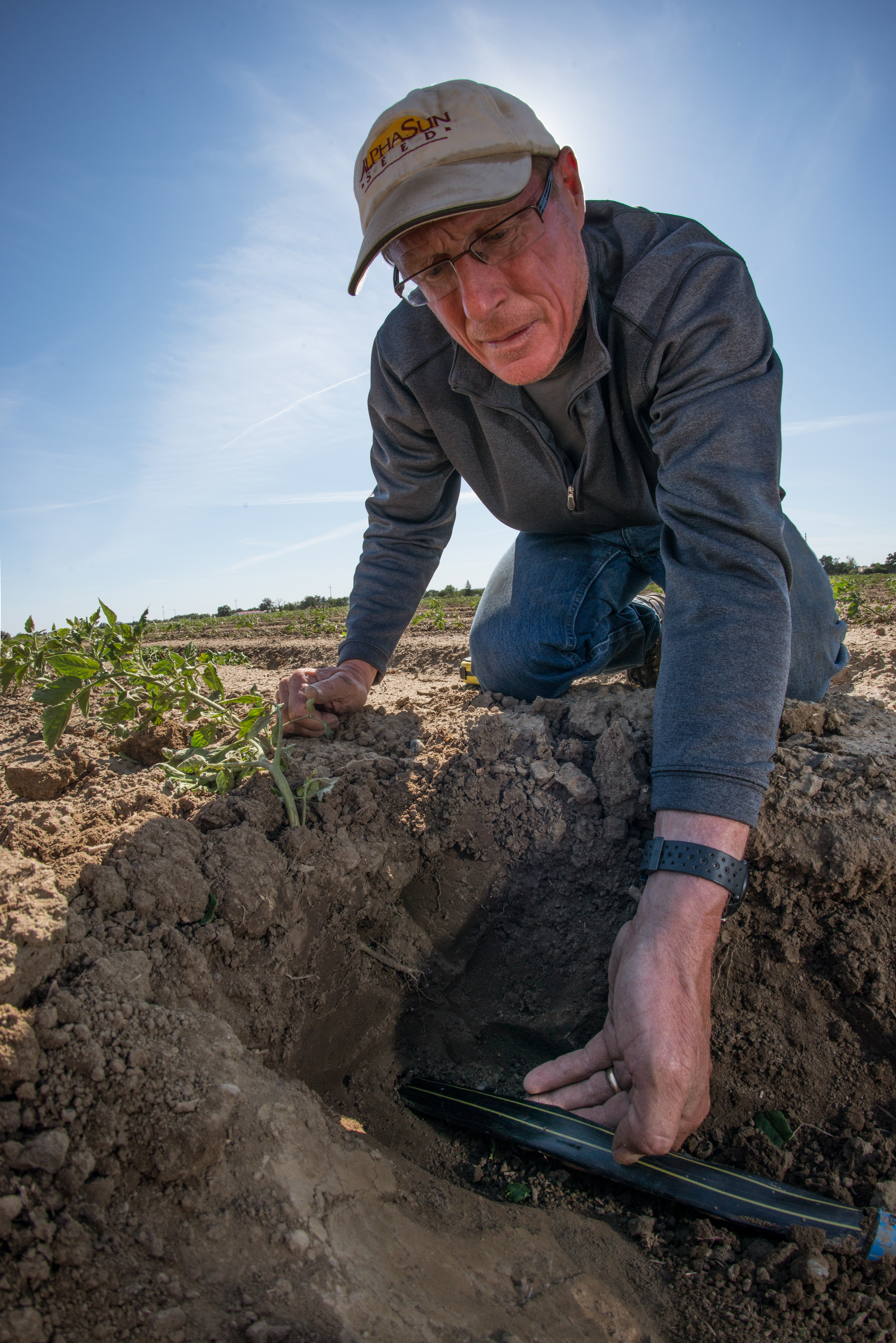
A farm owner inspecting an underground micro-irrigation system on a tomato farm in Woodland, California

Micro-irrigation, also called Micro-spray,localized, low-volume, low-flow, or trickle irrigation, is an irrigation method with lower water pressure and flow than a traditional sprinkler system. Low-volume irrigation is used in agriculture for row crops, orchards, and vineyards. It is also used in horticulture in wholesale nurseries, in landscaping for civic, commercial, and private landscapes and gardens, and in the science and practice of restoration ecology and environmental remediation. The lower volume allows the water to be absorbed into slow-percolation soils such as clay, minimizing runoff.

== System components ==
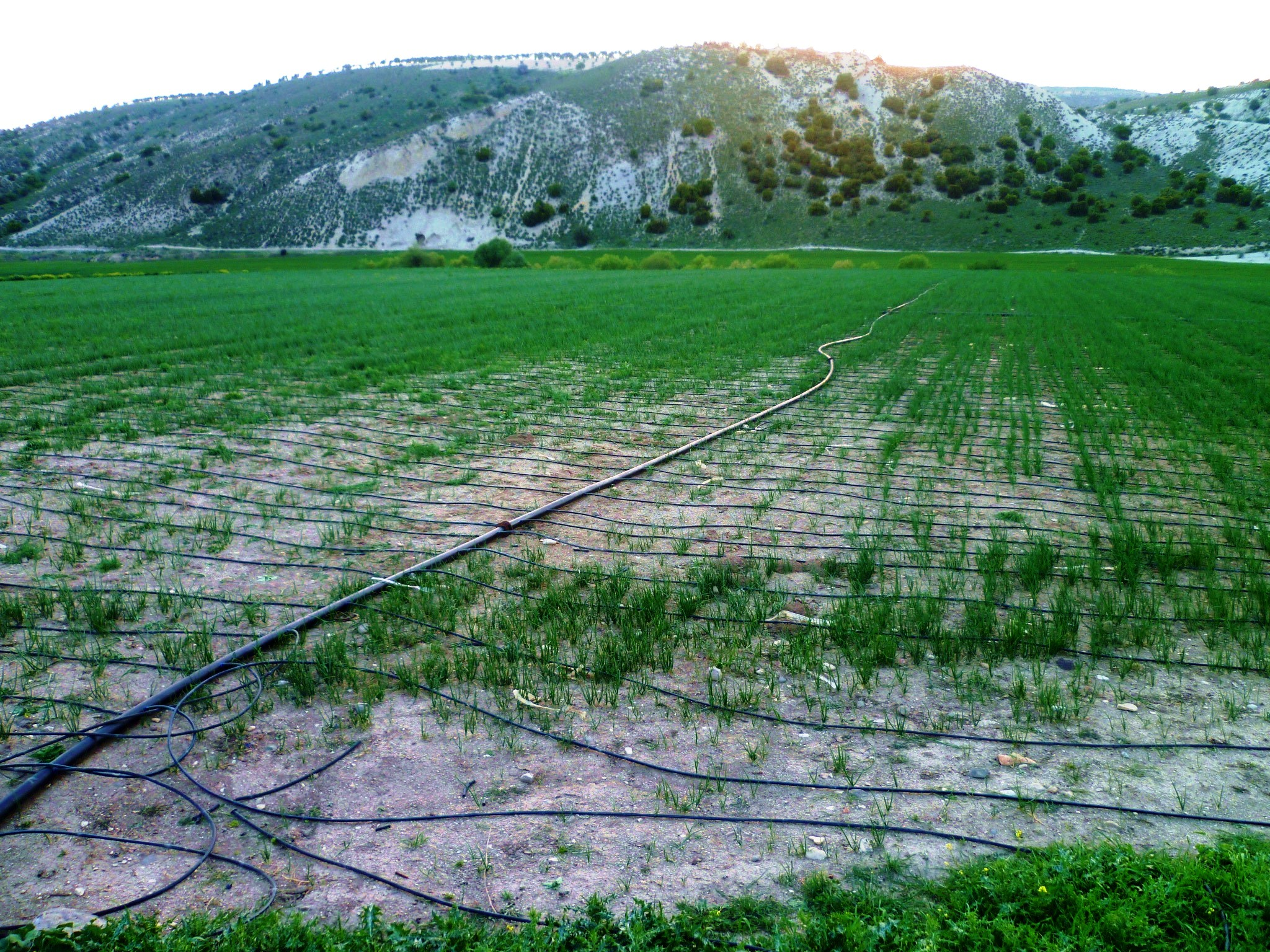
Sustainable micro-irrigation system in southern Afrin, Syria, created by the AANES (Rojava)

A wide variety of system components are used in micro-irrigation systems. Most include a filter, such as pre-filters, sand separators, media filters, screen filters, and disc filters. The level of filtration required depends on the size of the emission device and the quality of the water source. A Pressure regulator or regulating valve may be required to reduce the system pressure to the desired level. Automatically or manually operated valves are required to switch from one irrigated section to another. An irrigation controller is used with automatic systems and may be needed for back flushing the filter or sand separator. Since water conservation is a main reason for choosing micro-irrigation systems, soil moisture sensors, rain shutoff sensors and sometimes even weather stations may be installed to further reduce consumption.

== Emission devices ==
=== Microtubing ===
Microtubing is one of the oldest types of drip irrigation devices and was used in greenhouses in the 1970s. It consists of small diameter tubing. Flow is regulated purely by the tubing's length and diameter. Weights or stakes can be attached to the end of the tubing to keep it in place.

=== Flow drip emitters ===
Low-flow irrigation systems in gardens using drip apply water through two methods:

- Pre-installed small holes in small diameter tubes placed on or below the surface
- Self-cleaning emitters, in different precipitation rates, with different rate emitters on a supply line (i.e. trees-higher, perennials-lower). The Flexible supply pipe can be buried either underground or pinned on the surface.

Low volume irrigation systems often use the two delivery components of drip systems to apply water through small holes in small diameter tubes placed on or below the surface. This is done instead of agricultural surface irrigation and furrow irrigation for vegetables, fruits and berries, and other high-value crops.

=== Adjustable drip emitters ===
Trickle emitters, also called "spider sprays," come in fixed or adjustable radius shapes and diameters, and are installed directly on the flexible supply pipe or on tubing connected to it, and mounted on small stakes. Trickle emitters work well for plants with more fibrous root systems, tree and large shrub basins, and in pots and container gardens—allowing automated watering on decks and patios. Mist emitters can be used in pot, both on the ground and hanging, with humidity-fog watering for epiphytes and ferns replicating habitats.

In the horticulture industry, wholesale growers and plant nurseries often use trickle emitters for 5-US-gallon (19 L) and larger container stock, to automate watering. Attached to longer supply tubing on short stakes, they are easily movable to new containers when stock is moved or sold. Mist emitters are used for propagation, epiphytes, and other plants needing higher humidity.

=== Micro-sprinklers ===
Low volume micro-sprinklers or high-efficiency nozzles may be attached to hard plastic risers or attached to standard sprinkler heads, but are also mounted on stakes and attached to small diameter micro-tubing connected to polyethylene tubing with a barbed connector. Some micro-sprinklers have a fixed spray or stream pattern, while others rotate. These are installed above ground and are often used for fruit and nut orchards and vineyards. These systems are expensive, even for large-scale agricultural use, and are predominantly reserved for high-value crops.

=== Macro-drip irrigation ===
High-volume, low-pressure irrigation systems for container gardening are known as Macro-Drip. A pressure regulator lowers the water pressure to under 200 kPa (30 psi) while a relatively large diameter hose or pipe delivers the water directly to a sprinkler head. This allows a larger volume of water to reach the flowerpot in a short amount of time, which will then be absorbed into the roots of the plant.

== Sprinkler ==
Sprinkler irrigation sprays water onto the land. Sprinklers spread water in an equal balance. It decreases labor costs and saves up to 20%–40% in water supply. It can be applied to any soil that helps to increase crop production. A wide variety of sprinklers available in the market; one can choose carefully from the best of sprinkler systems.

== Ecological restoration and phytoremediation projects ==
Low-flow irrigation systems are used on native plant habitat restoration and environmental remediation projects. The lower operating pressure can be the only choice for remote locations with wells or small storage tank water sources. It is used in temporary installations during initial establishment periods, and on the soil surface is easily removable with minimal damage to the recovering plant community. An example is its use in riparian zone restoration, and environmental remediation projects using phytoremediation and bioremediation techniques.

== Water conservation ==
As municipal and agricultural water supplies become more constrained due to increasing population, droughts and climate change; city, water district, and state-province level regulations and codes are beginning to encourage or mandate reduced water consumption. Micro-irrigation is an efficient way to conserve water and reduce water consumption. According to the EPA report, a typical American home uses 30% of its water outside, and up to 50% of that water might be lost to runoff, wind or evaporation, partly due to the improper irrigation system. Micro-irrigation supplies water only where it is required and delivers water directly to the root zone of plants at a lower flow rate, allowing the water to soak into the soil rather than run off. According to research, micro-irrigation systems consume 20–50% less water than traditional spray sprinkler systems.

Use of micro-irrigation systems on green building candidate projects can help them to accumulate points for LEED - (Leadership in Energy and Environmental Design) certification rating and awards.

== See also ==
- Deficit irrigation
- Drip irrigation
- Irrigation in viticulture
- Groundwater recharge
- Water conservation
