= Filtered water =

Filtered water may refer to:

- Water filter
- Water purification
