= Samara embankment =

Coordinates: 53°11′22.9″N 50°4′56″E

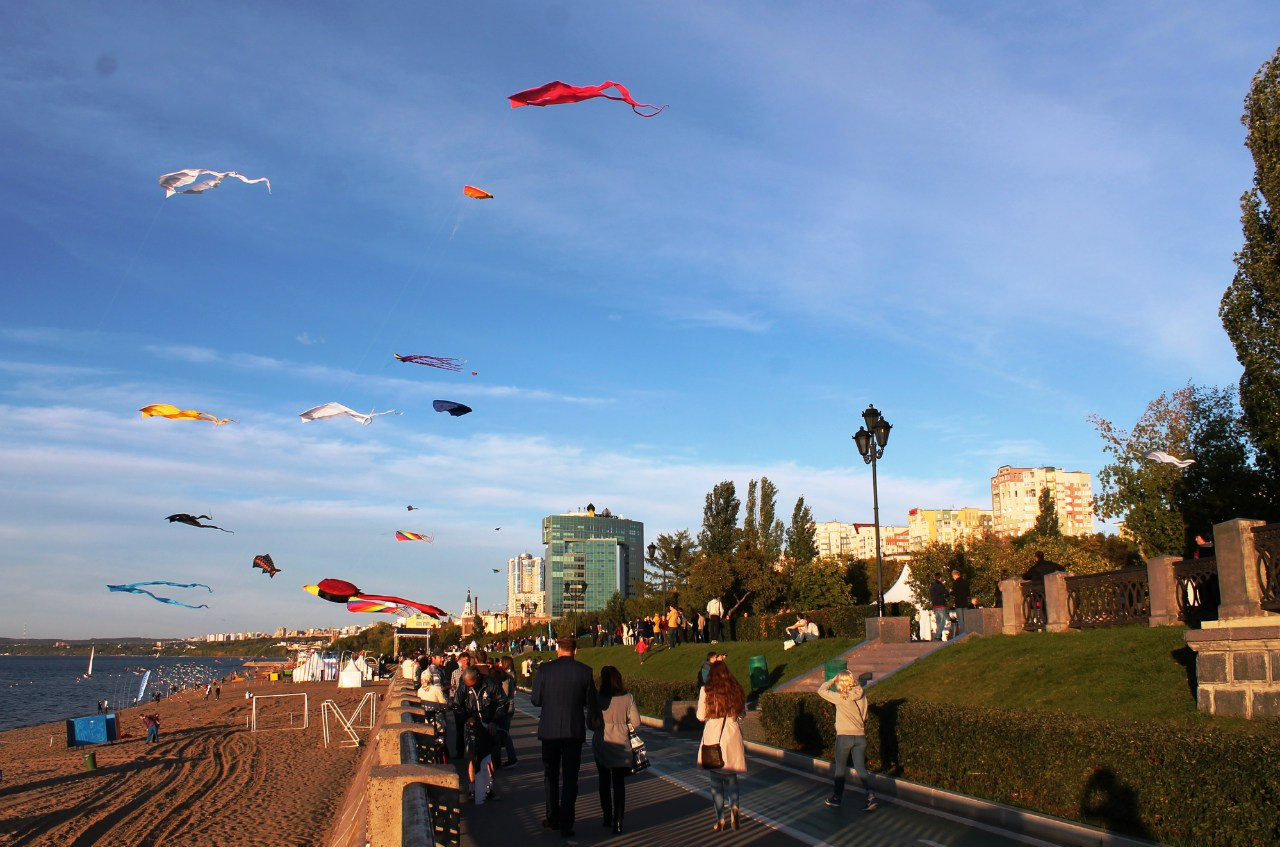
Samara embankment

The Samara embankment (Russian: Самарская набережная; Samarskaya naberezhnaya) is a 5 km long pedestrianized street along the left bank of the Volga river in Central Samara, Russia. It spans between Lesnaya Street and Samara river port.

== History ==
=== The first stage ===
Design work was begun in the 1930s. Wooden houses, storage facilities and stables occupied the Volga bank. In order to begin the construction it was necessary to demolish all buildings, strengthen the bank, extend the riverside, plant trees and shrubs and shape a beach. The Samara embankment was designed by architect Mikhail Trufanov. The project included four stages: the first between Vilonovskaya and Nekrasovskaya Streets, the second between Studenchesky lane and Volzhsky avenue, the third between Nekrasovskaya Street and Samara river terminal and the fourth between Volzhsky avenue and a ravine at the north-west of Samara.

The bank was cleared between Vilonovsky and Nekrasocsky ramp. A beach appeared here in 1939. The building of the 1350-metre-long first stage of the embankment was begun in 1940. In 1941 construction was suspended before 1954 following the outbreak of the Second World War. Retaining wall was erected along the bank. Ural Granite was used for lining of the embankment. New promenade was decorated with the concrete sculptures and young trees. Now a lot of summer cafe with a view to the river operate here.

=== The second stage ===
1400-m long the second stage was erected between 1958 and 1961. Retaining wall was made of reinforced concrete. Granite was used for stairs and curbstones. The second section is a 30–60 meters wide boulevard with 7 meters wide promenade alleys which is decorated with garden sofa. In 2011 the section was reсonstructed. The embankment was cobbled, street lights was replaced and for bicyclists was made bikeways. Monument to the first Samara voivode Grigory Zasekin was opened in 2014 near Polevoy ramp.

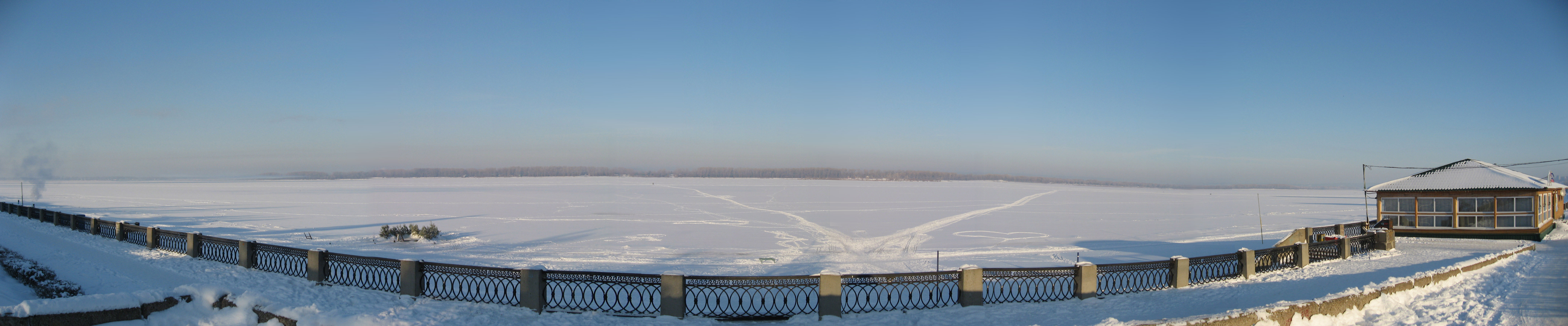
A panoramic view of the Samara embankment in winter

=== The third stage ===
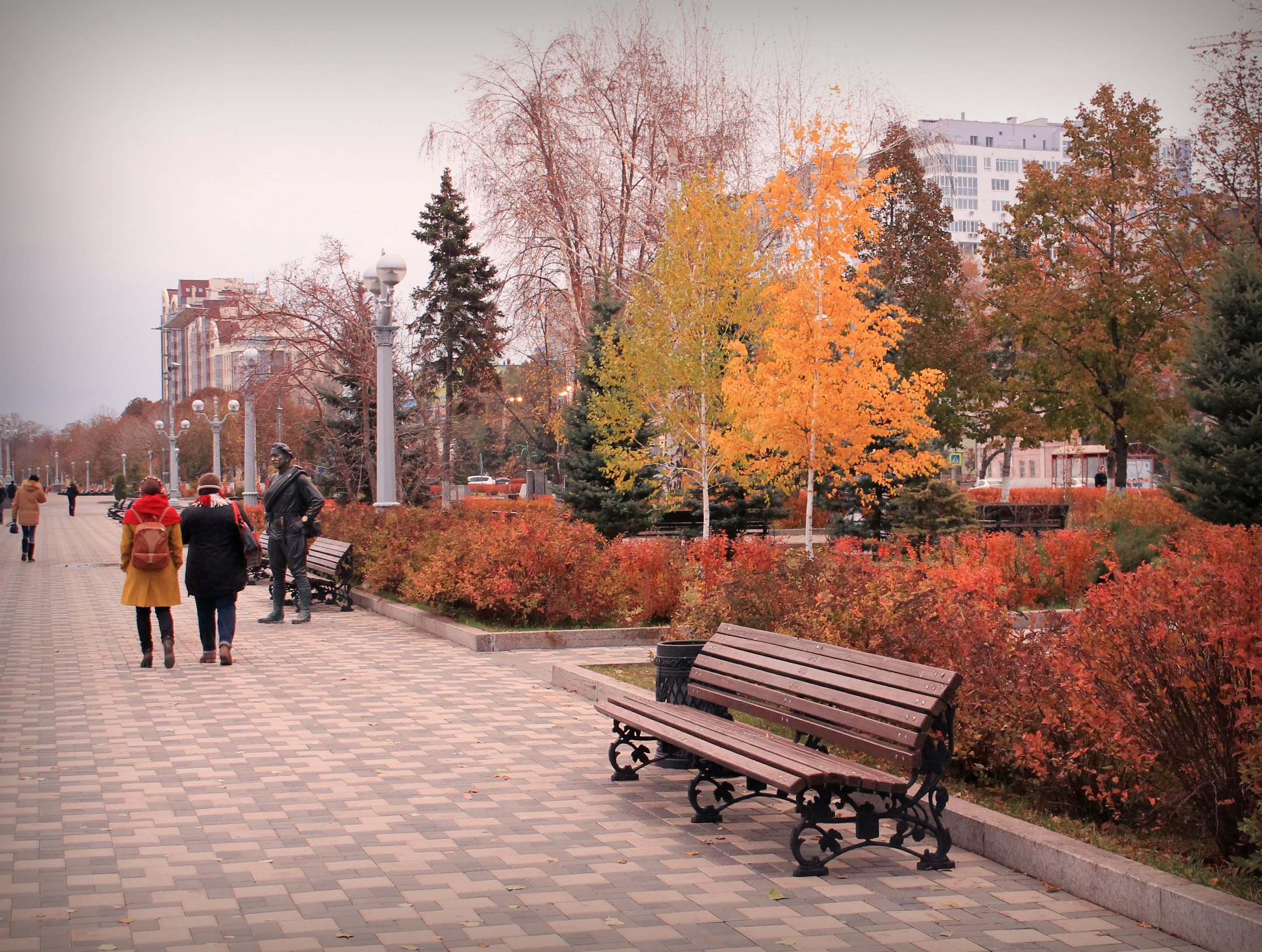
The third stage in autumn

The third stage is a continuation of the first stage to the river terminal. The calciferous retaining wall was built in the early 20th century. After the construction of the new river port building this section of the bank had made more pleasant. The territory was landscaped and decorated with a fountain by architect M. Trufanov. In 2012 the section was reconstructed similarly to the second section.

=== The fourth stage ===
The river bank in this location has a sharp incline. That is why it was cut into two of successively receding flat surfaces (terraces). The fourth stage of Samara embankment has non-official name Oktyabrskaya embankment. Ladya monument in the form of a boat which is one of the most prominent symbols of Samara was opened here in 1986. The opening ceremony was held in conjunction by the 400-year anniversary of Samara.
