= Water filter =

Device that removes impurities in water

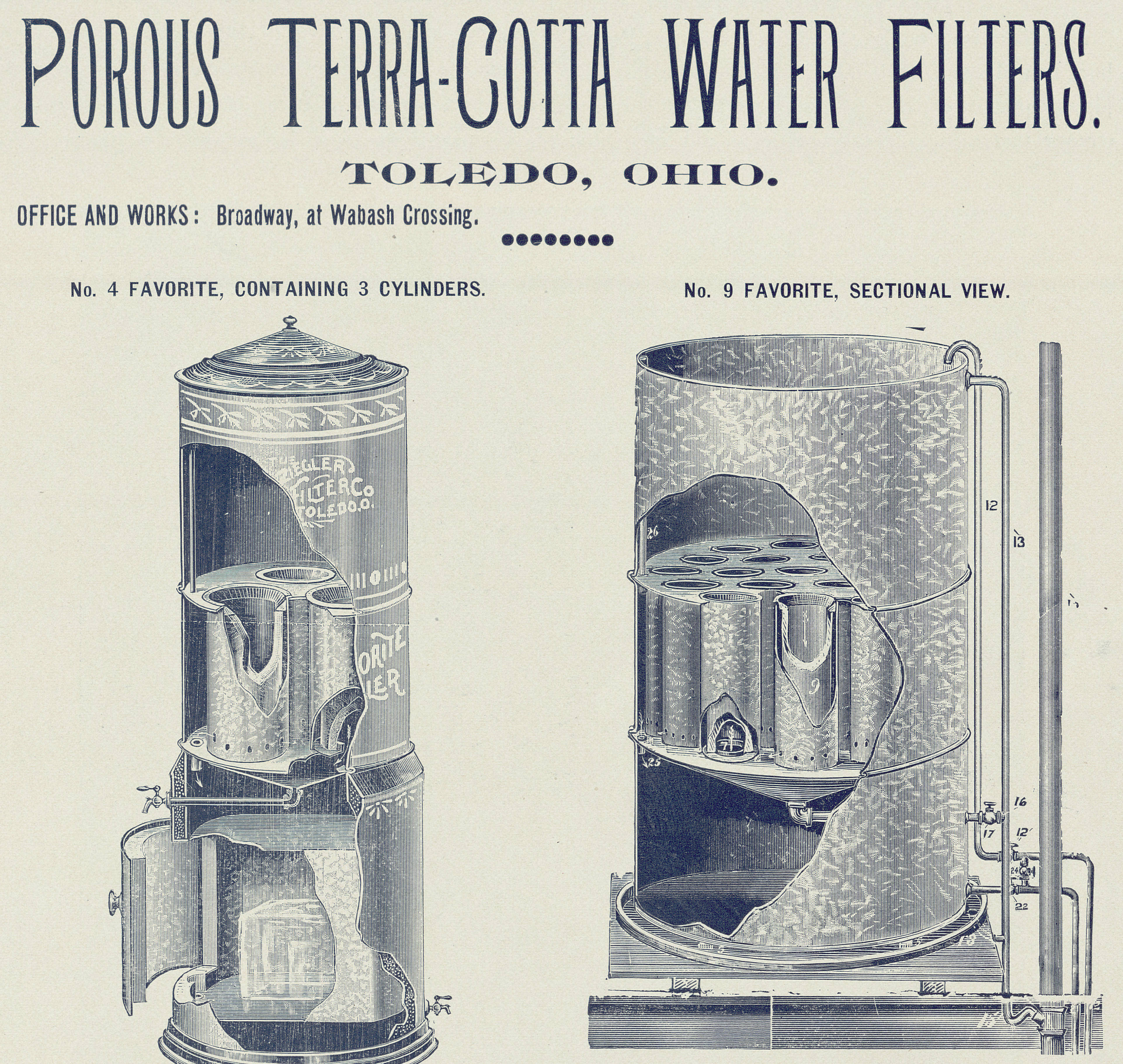
Water filters produced in Toledo, Ohio in 1895 out of terracotta

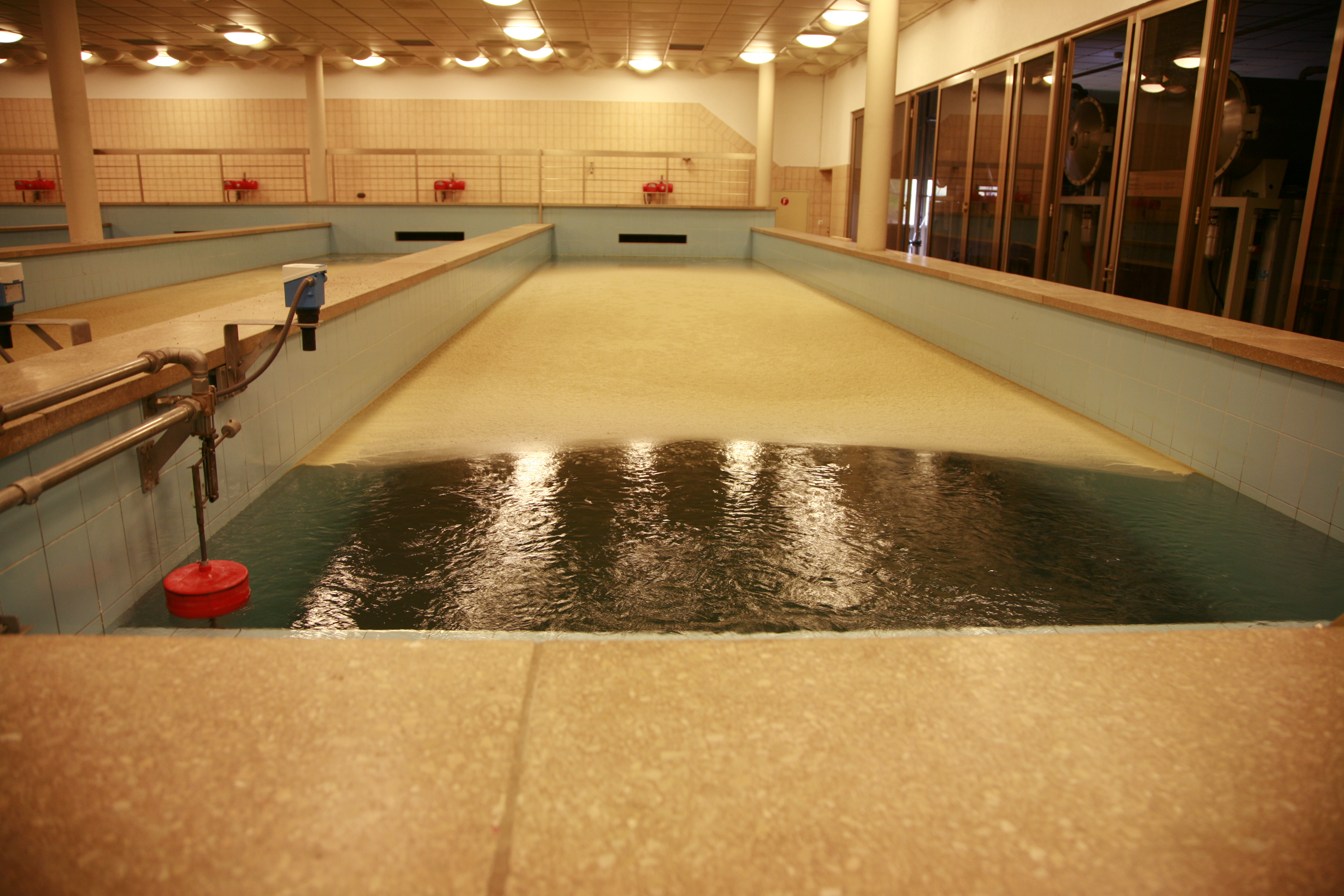
A large-scale flocculation water filter

A water filter removes impurities by lowering contamination of water using a fine physical barrier, a chemical process, or a biological process. Filters cleanse water to different extents, for purposes such as: providing agricultural irrigation, accessible drinking water, industrial use, public and private aquariums, and the safe use of ponds and swimming pools.

== Methods of filtration ==
Filters use sieving, adsorption, ion exchanges, biofilms and other processes to remove unwanted substances from water. Unlike a sieve or screen, a filter can potentially remove particles much smaller than the holes through which its water passes, such as nitrates or germs like Cryptosporidium.

Among the methods of filtration, notable examples are sedimentation, used to separate hard and suspended solids from water and activated charcoal treatment, where, typically, boiled water is poured through a piece of cloth to trap undesired residuals. Additionally, the use of machinery to work on desalinization and purification of water through the transposal of it into multiple-filtration water tanks is used. This technique is aimed at the filtration of water on bigger scales, such as serving entire cities.

These three methods are particularly relevant, as they trace back centuries and are the base for many of the modern methods of filtration used today.

== Types ==
=== Water treatment plant filters ===
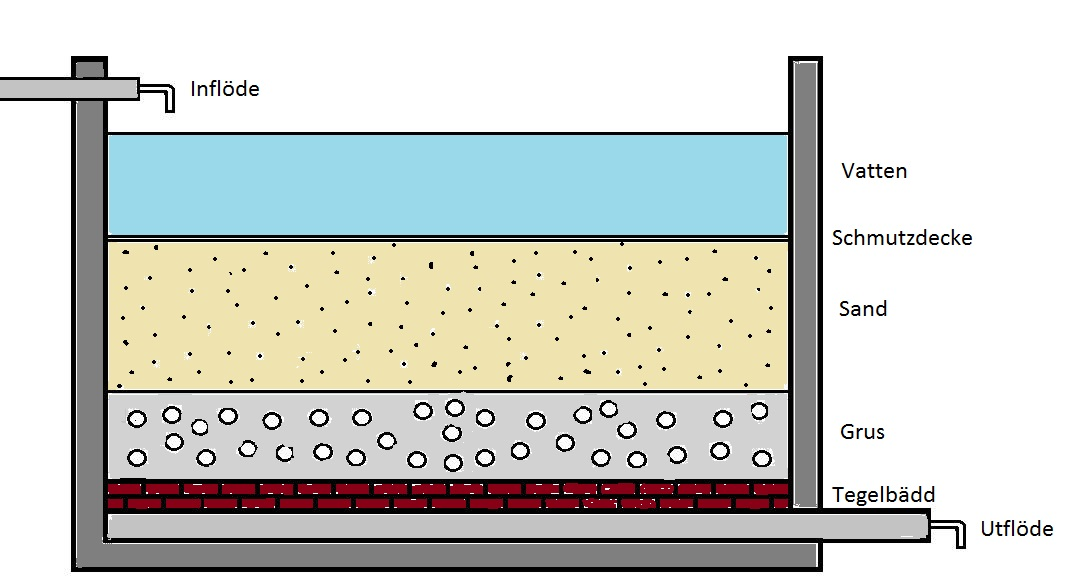
Illustration of a slow sand filter

Types of water filters for municipal and other large treatment systems include media filters, screen filters, disk filters, slow sand filter beds, rapid sand filters, cloth filters, and biological filters such as algae scrubbers.

=== Point-of-use filters ===
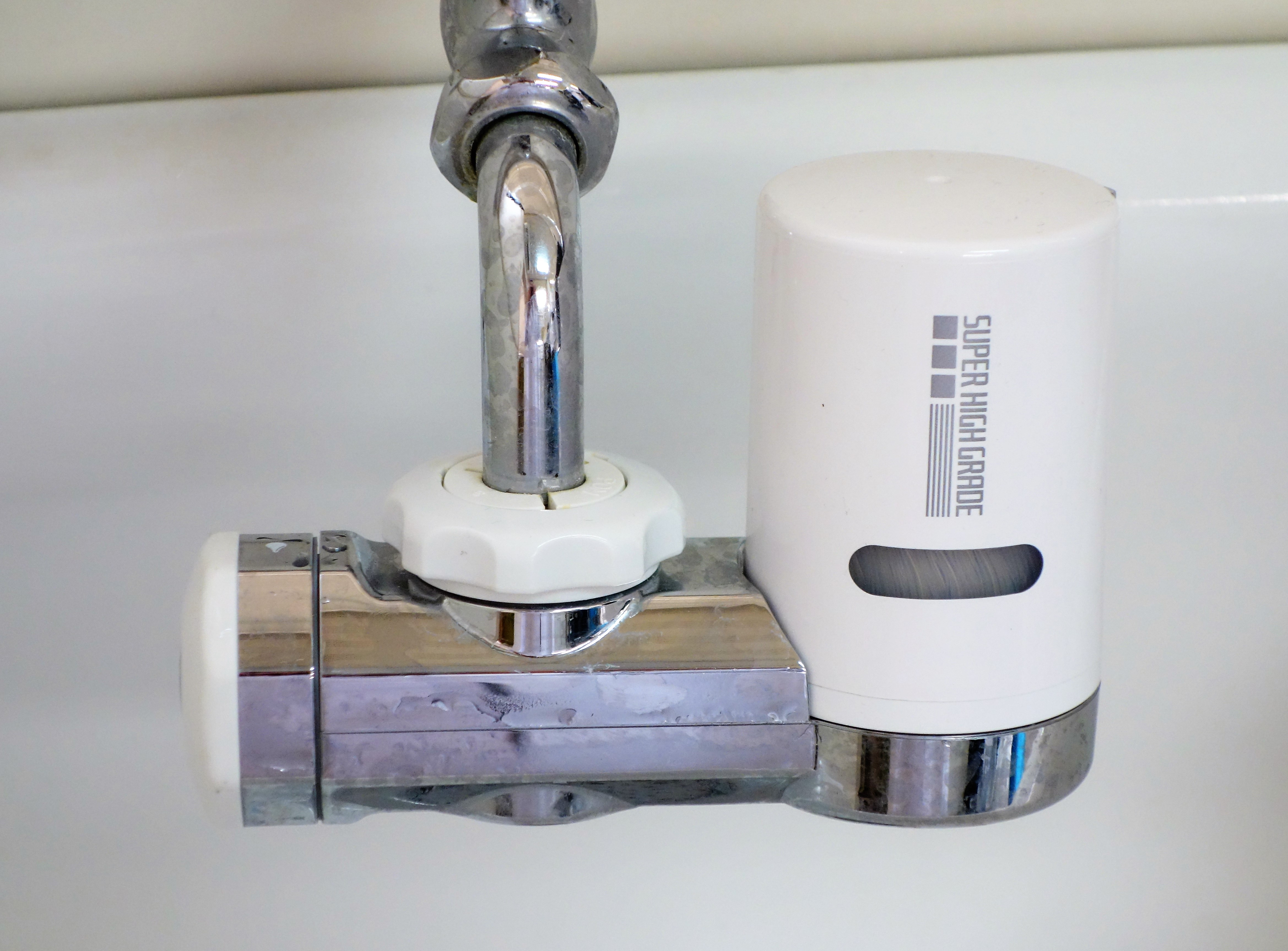
Water purifier attached to a sink faucet

Point-of-use filters for home use include granular-activated carbon filters used for carbon filtering, depth filter, metallic alloy filters, microporous ceramic filters, carbon block resin, microfiltration and ultrafiltration membranes. Some filters use more than one filtration method. An example of this is a multi-barrier system. Jug filters can be used for small quantities of drinking water. Some kettles have built-in filters, primarily to reduce limescale build-up.

=== Portable water filters ===
Water filters are used by hikers, aid organizations during humanitarian emergencies, and the military. These filters are usually small, portable and lightweight (1–2 lb (0.45–0.91 kg) or less). These usually filter water by working a mechanical hand pump, although some use a siphon drip system to force water through, while others are built into water bottles. Dirty water is pumped via a screen-filtered flexible silicon tube through a specialized filter, ending up in a container. These filters work to remove bacteria, protozoa and microbial cysts that can cause disease. Filters may have fine meshes that must be replaced or cleaned, and ceramic water filters must have its outside abraded when they have become clogged with impurities.

These water filters should not be confused with devices or tablets that disinfect water, which remove or kill viruses such as hepatitis A and rotavirus.

=== Ceramic water filters ===
Ceramic filters represent low-cost solutions to water filtration and are widely used despite being one of the oldest methods of filtration. These filters are found not only inside the homes of families but also used in industrial engineering (as high-temperature filters) for several processes.

The conventional ceramic filters used for day-to-day water consumption, known as candle-type filters, work with gravity and a central candle, which makes the filtration process significantly long.

== Water polishing ==
The term water polishing can refer to any process that removes small (usually microscopic) particulate material, or removes very low concentrations of dissolved material from water. The process and its meaning vary from setting to setting: a manufacturer of aquarium filters may claim that its filters perform water polishing by capturing "micro particles" within nylon or polyester pads, just as a chemical engineer can use the term to refer to the removal of magnetic resins from a solution by passing the solution over a bed of magnetic particulate. In this sense, water polishing is simply another term for whole house water filtration systems. Polishing is also done on a large scale in water reclamation plants.

== History ==
Evidence suggests that Egypt was among the earliest civilizations to employ alum for suspended solid removal.Before 1100 BCE, the Minoans used sand filters, settlement cisterns, and ceramic filters to remove sediment from water supplies.Early Sanskrit texts such as the Sushruta Samhita described techniques including boiling, solar exposure, and filtration through sand and gravel. In ancient Greece, Hippocrates advocated the use of clean water and devised a cloth filter known as the Hippocratic sleeve.In China, boiling water became a common practice to improve water safety. Around 2,000 years ago, the Maya civilization used filtration systems containing quartz and zeolite minerals. Later, the Persian engineer Al-Karaji described water filtration methods in his work The Extraction of Hidden Waters.

Until the invention of the microscope, the existence of microscopic life was undiscovered. More than 200 years passed before the microscope was invented and the relationship between microorganisms and disease became clear. In the mid-19th century, cholera was proven to be transmitted by contaminated water. In the late 19th century, Louis Pasteur's theory of the particulate pathogen finally established a causal relationship between microorganisms and disease. Filtration as a method of water purification was established in the 18th century, and the first municipal water treatment plant was built in Scotland in 1832. However, the aesthetic value of water was important at the time, and effective water quality standards did not exist until the late 19th century.

During the 19th and 20th centuries, water filters for domestic water production were generally divided into slow sand filters and rapid sand filters (also called mechanical filters and American filters). While there were many small-scale water filtration systems prior to 1800, Paisley, Scotland is generally acknowledged as the first city to receive filtered water for an entire town. The Paisley filter began operation in 1804 and was an early type of slow sand filter. Throughout the 1800s, hundreds of slow sand filters were constructed in the UK and on the European continent. An intermittent slow sand filter was constructed and operated at Lawrence, Massachusetts in 1893 due to continuing typhoid fever epidemics caused by sewage contamination of the water supply. The first continuously operating slow sand filter was designed by Allen Hazen for the city of Albany, New York in 1897. The most comprehensive history of water filtration was published by Moses N. Baker in 1948 and reprinted in 1981.

In the 1800s, mechanical filtration was an industrial process that depended on the addition of aluminium sulfate prior to the filtration process. The filtration rate for mechanical filtration was typically more than 60 times faster than slow sand filters, thus requiring significantly less land area. The first modern mechanical filtration plant in the U.S. was built at Little Falls, New Jersey, for the East Jersey Water Company. George W. Fuller designed and supervised the construction of the plant which went into operation in 1902. In 1924, John R. Baylis developed a fixed grid backwash assist system, which consisted of pipes with nozzles that injected jets of water into the filter material during expansion.

== See also ==
- Backwashing (water treatment)
- Carbon filtering
- Distillation
- Kinetic degradation fluxion media
- Point of use water filter
- Point of use water treatment
- Reverse osmosis
- Reverse osmosis plant
- Sand separator
- Settling basin
- Swimming pool sanitation
- Water softening
