= KDF =

KDF may refer to:

== Entertainment ==
- K22JA-D, a TV station in Texas, US
- Kentucky Derby Festival, Louisville, US
- Klingon Defence Force, in Star Trek

== Organisations ==
- Kerala Dalit Federation, an Indian political party
- Kenya Defence Forces
- KDF Energy, Romania
- Kraft durch Freude (Strength Through Joy), a Nazi state leisure organization
- Kanzlei des Führers (Chancellory of the Führer), a Nazi office

== Sport ==
- Kunst des fechtens, the German school of fencing

== Technologies ==
- KDF9, a British computer
- Key derivation function, in cryptography
- Kinetic degradation fluxion media, for water filtration

== See also ==
- KdF (disambiguation)
