= Traveling screen =

Water filtration device

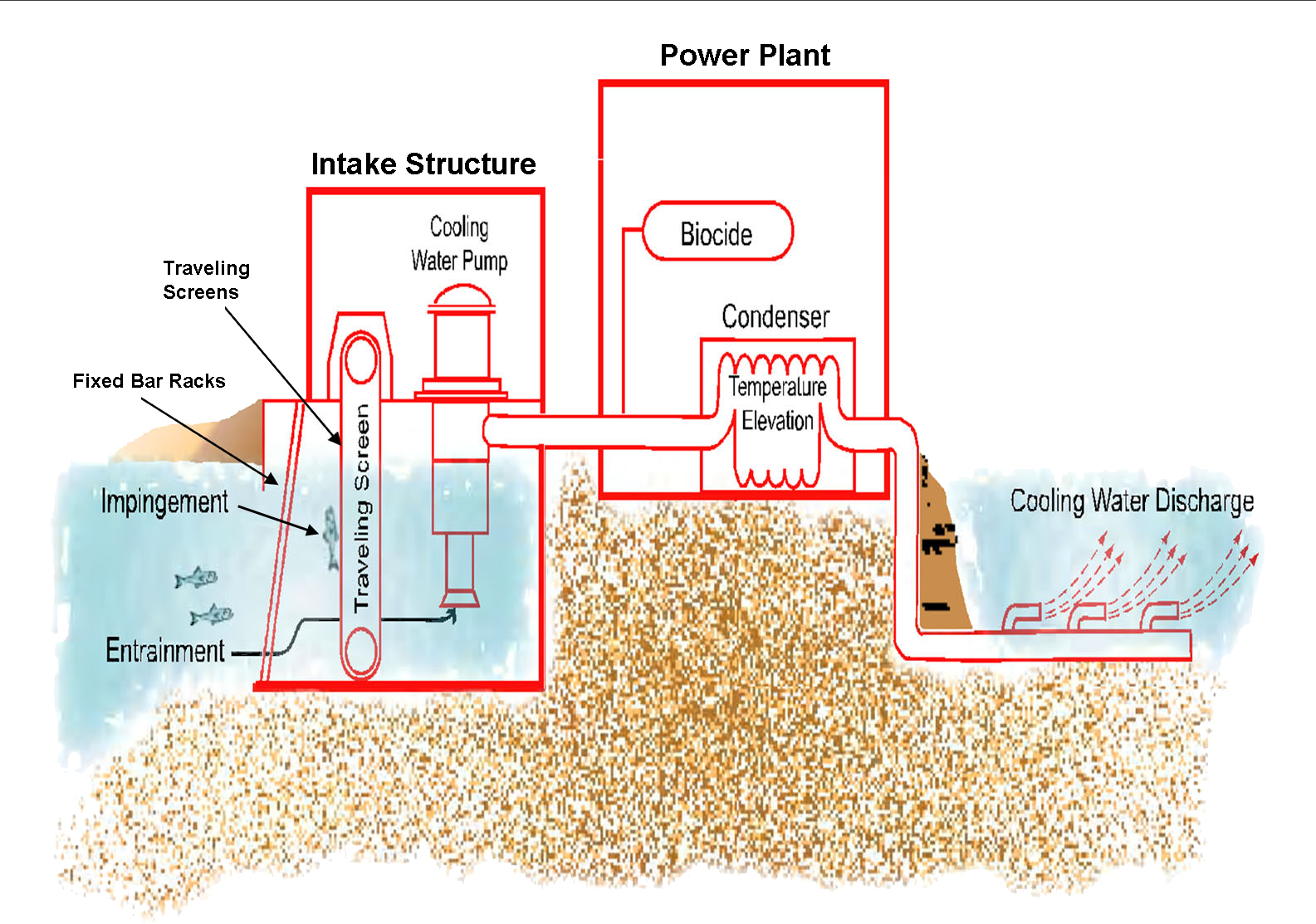
Diagram of a typical travelling screen used at power plants and factories

A traveling screen is a type of water filtration device that has a continuously moving mesh screen that is used to catch and remove debris. This type of device is usually found in water intake systems for drinking water and sewage treatment plants. Screening is considered the first step in conventional sewage treatment processes. Screening is also used in cooling water intakes in steam electric power plants, hydroelectric generators, petroleum refineries, and chemical plants. Traveling screens are used to divert fish, shellfish and other aquatic species, and debris including leaves, sticks, and trash; for the purpose of preventing damage to a facility's treatment or cooling system.

== See also ==
- Bar screen
- Fish screen
