= KdF =

KdF may refer to:

- German school of fencing (Kunst des Fechtens), a historical system of combat taught in the Holy Roman Empire
- Kraft durch Freude (Strength Through Joy), a large state-operated leisure organization in Nazi Germany

== See also ==
- KDF (disambiguation)
