= University of Maryland Biotechnology Institute =

Defunct (restructured) research institute of the University System of Maryland

Coordinates: 39°17′11″N 76°36′21″W

Formed in 1985, the University of Maryland Biotechnology Institute (UMBI) was created to provide a unified focus for Maryland's biotechnology research and education. Now it refers as Institute of Marine and Environmental Technology (IMET). In 2010, the four centers of the UMBI were integrated into other institutions at the university.

== Background ==
In 1985, Maryland's General Assembly authorized the development of the Maryland Biotechnology Institute at the University of Maryland. The University of Maryland Biotechnology Institute was a hub of intensive study into the applied science of biotechnology and its application to human health, the marine environment, agriculture, and protein engineering/structural biology. The institute was supported by the Maryland Governor and the legislature, providing stable funding to promote Maryland's development into biotechnology.

UMBI's four centers conducted research and training providing a core of expertise and facilities to advance the state's scientific and economic development. The Institute emphasized collaboration with industry, other research institutions, and federal laboratories; and sponsors training workshops, short courses, symposia, and seminars throughout the year.

== Centers ==
It comprised four centers:

- Center for Advanced Research in Biotechnology (CARB)
- Center for Biosystems Research (CBR)
- Center of Marine Biotechnology (COMB)
- Medical Biotechnology Center (MBC)

The UMBI Central Administration was located in the Columbus Center in the Inner Harbor, Baltimore, Maryland. The Columbus Center's Hall of Exploration was used at the home for a short-lived marine biotechnology museum from May through December 1997.

In 2009, the Board of Regents at the University of Maryland decided close the Institute and align each of the Institute's centers with other institutions at the university. The process to realign the centers was completed on July 1, 2010.

== See also ==
- Cloth filter, a low cost water treatment developed by academics from UMBI
