= Copper zinc water filtration =

Water filtration process

Copper zinc water filtration is a high-purity brass water filtration process that relies on the redox potential of dissolved oxygen in water in the presence of a zinc anode and copper cathode. It uses dissolved impurities within water as constituent substrate, which are reduced to more physiologically inert compounds.

Due to inherent limitations in bactericidal and antiprotozoal activity and poor filtration of organic chemicals (in particular organophosphate pesticides), copper zinc water filters are not commonly used in the household setting unless combined with carbon based systems. They also have application in the industrial setting to extend the life of carbon based filtration systems for waste water effluent.

== Chemistry ==
In the filtration process, zinc acts as an anode and copper as a cathode in an electrolytic cell. Ionic contaminants are removed by electron exchange (a redox reaction), in which they are converted to a more physiologically inert form. This redox reaction generates an electric potential of about 300mV, which may be responsible for the partial antimicrobial effect, along with hydroxyl radicals that form during the process.

== Specifications ==
The process can remove chlorine, hydrogen sulfide, heavy metals, iron, and can reduce certain inorganic contaminants. The filter also inhibits the growth of algae, fungi, and bacteria to an extent. Copper zinc filtration has been used in municipal processing, and the treatment of medical and dental waste water, as well as for industrial effluents. They can be a component of whole home water filtration systems at point of entry or inline with shower heads or sink heads at point of use, as they remove many forms of dissolved chlorine and are effective at higher temperatures.

One of the earlier described commercial methods for copper zinc water filtration is via kinetic degradation fluxion media (KDF), a product whose main filtration line consists of brass granules with varying proportions of zinc and copper alloy. It was developed in 1984 and patented by Don Heskett in 1987. An alternative KDF media is a matrix of fine metal similar to steel wool.

== Filtration and usage ==
Amongst copper zinc water filtration methods, KDF is certified to the NSF International Standard 61 for water treatment plant applications, and the 2010 NSF standard for drinking water treatment units. A 2005 report by the US Department of Health and Human Services found that, under normal operating conditions, a treatment of contaminated groundwater in the Cedar Brook area consisting of KDF and activated carbon filtration removed volatile organic compounds and mercury to levels compliant with the state drinking water standards, though they also noted the water used may already need to be "exceptionally clean" prior to filtration.

=== Limitations ===
Copper zinc water filtration does not remove organic chemicals, such as pesticides and disinfection byproducts, nor is it effective against the parasitic cysts of giardia or cryptosporidium. and must be periodically backwashed with hot water to clean them. This reduces their efficiency, and the pollutants dislodged by washing can lead to water contamination. The United States Environmental Protection Agency found that copper zinc water filtration can remove mercury from contaminated water, but only at low concentrations, and recommends that for highly contaminated water other processes be used.

Due to their bactericidal action, copper zinc water filtration devices are considered by the EPA to be "pesticidal". However, Stanford physician Paul Auerbach recommends against their usage as a sole means of germicidal water treatment, and he does not include them amongst his recommended protozoal disinfection methods at either point of entry or point of use. A 1995 United States Environmental Protection Agency report found that such systems were employed at approximately 20 US-based cooling towers in 1993. The report documented variable results, with some systems discontinued because they were ineffective at controlling bacterial growth, though in other instances they were preferred because of comparatively safe waste production and simpler maintenance.

There is also concern about environmental damage due to the release of zinc in areas with high concentrations of metals or certain pollutants, in particular copper and chlorine. Publications of the American Water Works Association do not recommend the use of copper zinc water filtration systems to treat chlorinated water that outflows to streams.

Studies have also shown that regulation standards for the systems can vary widely or be nonexistent depending on the industry and region of their usage.

== See also ==
- Antimicrobial properties of copper – Abilities of copper to kill or stop the growth of microorganisms
- Antimicrobial copper-alloy touch surfaces – Surfaces with antimicrobial copper coatings
- Chloramine
