= Sand separator =

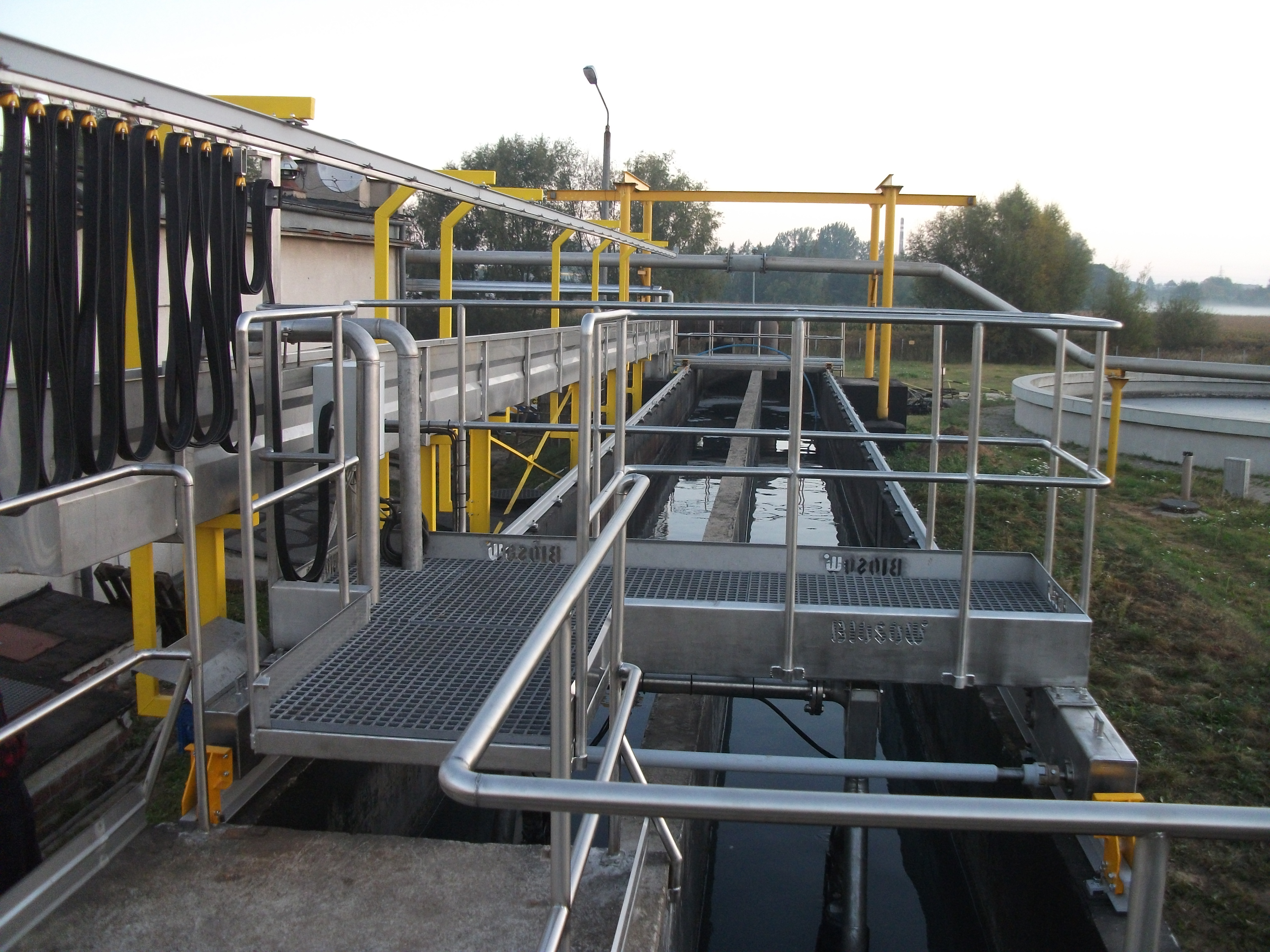
Sand separator in sewage treatment plant in Wieluń.

A sand separator is a device that separates sand or other solids from water.

One version of sand separator utilizes centrifugal force to separate sand or other heavy particles out of the water. The separated material drops down into a tank or reservoir where it can be removed later or in the case of in-well separators, the separated sand drops into the bottom of the well. It is not a true filter, since there is no physical barrier to separate out the particles, but it is often used upstream of a filter to first remove the bulk of the contaminant, where the filter does the final cleaning. This type of design reduces the time required to flush and clean the filter.

== Applications ==
- Used in micro-irrigation systems to remove sand and silt particles from irrigation water.
- Grinding circuits within the mineral processing industry and micro-irrigation. The coarse particles return to the mill for re-grinding while the finer products are passed on to a subsequent stage of treatment.

== See also ==
- Hydrocyclone
- Cyclonic separation
