= Terrace (building) =

Open, raised, flat area of a landscape or roof

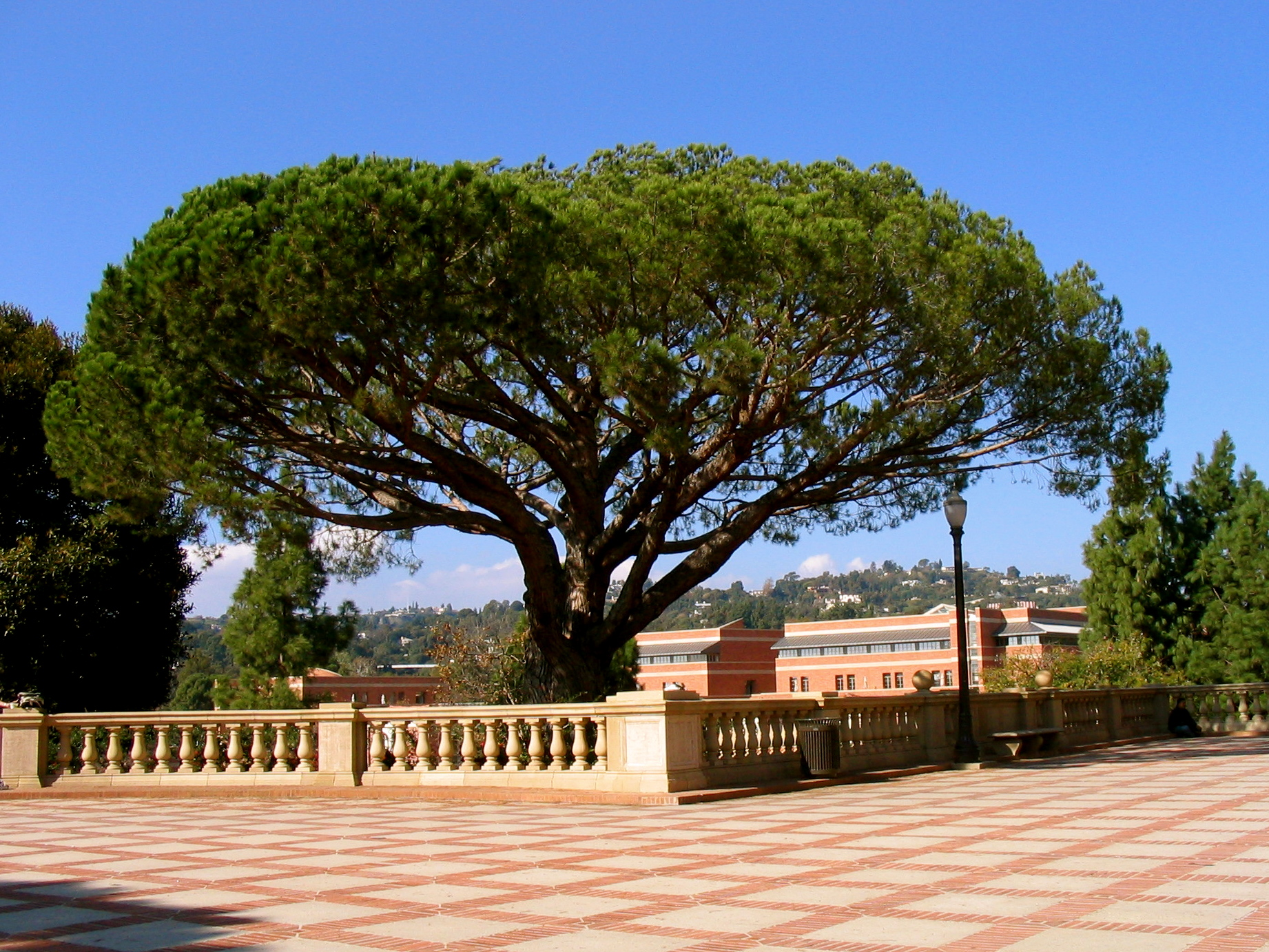
A terrace

A terrace is an external, raised, open, flat area in either a landscape (such as a park or garden) near a building, or as a roof terrace on a flat roof.

== Ground terraces ==
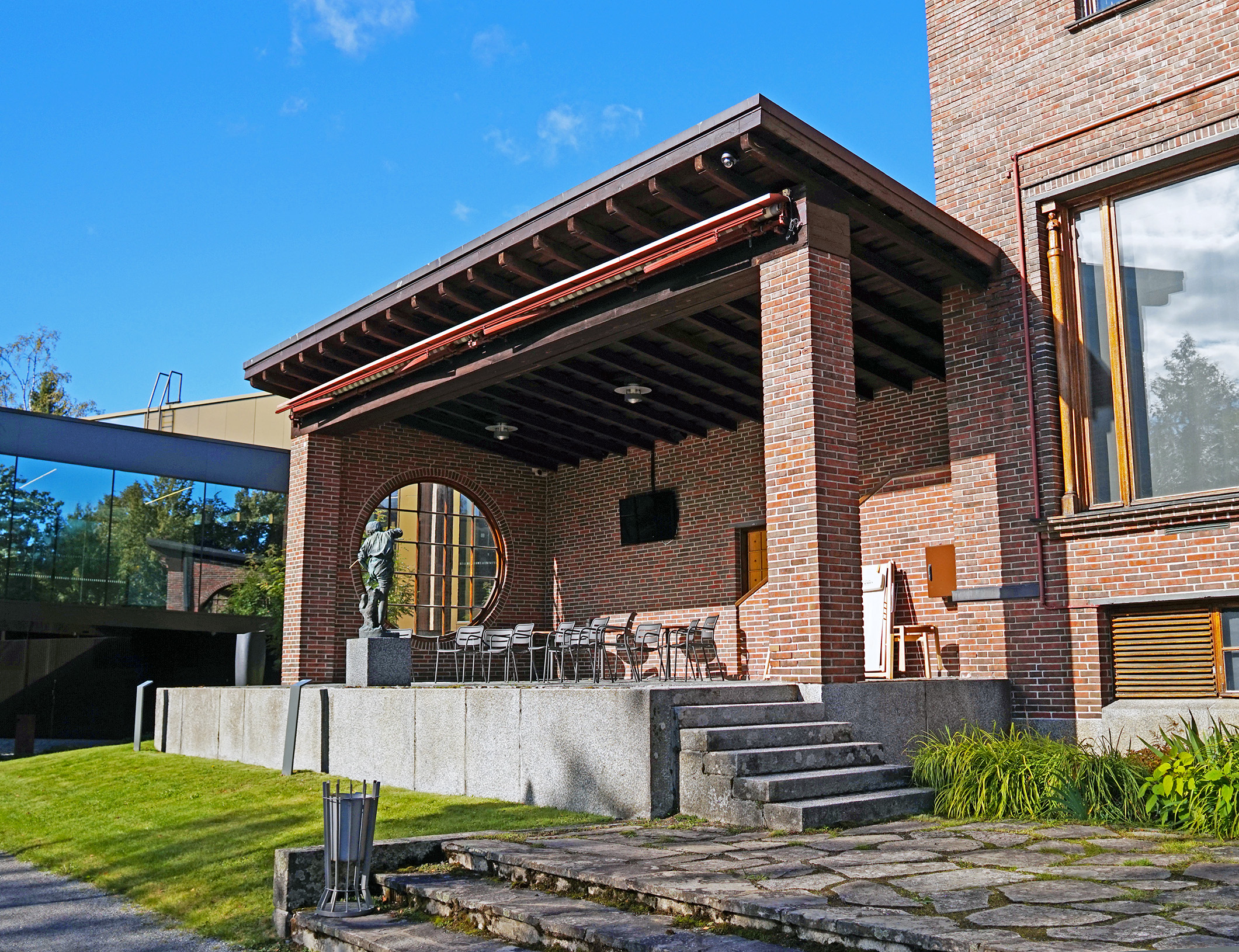
A terrace of the Joenniemi Manor in Mänttä-Vilppula, Finland

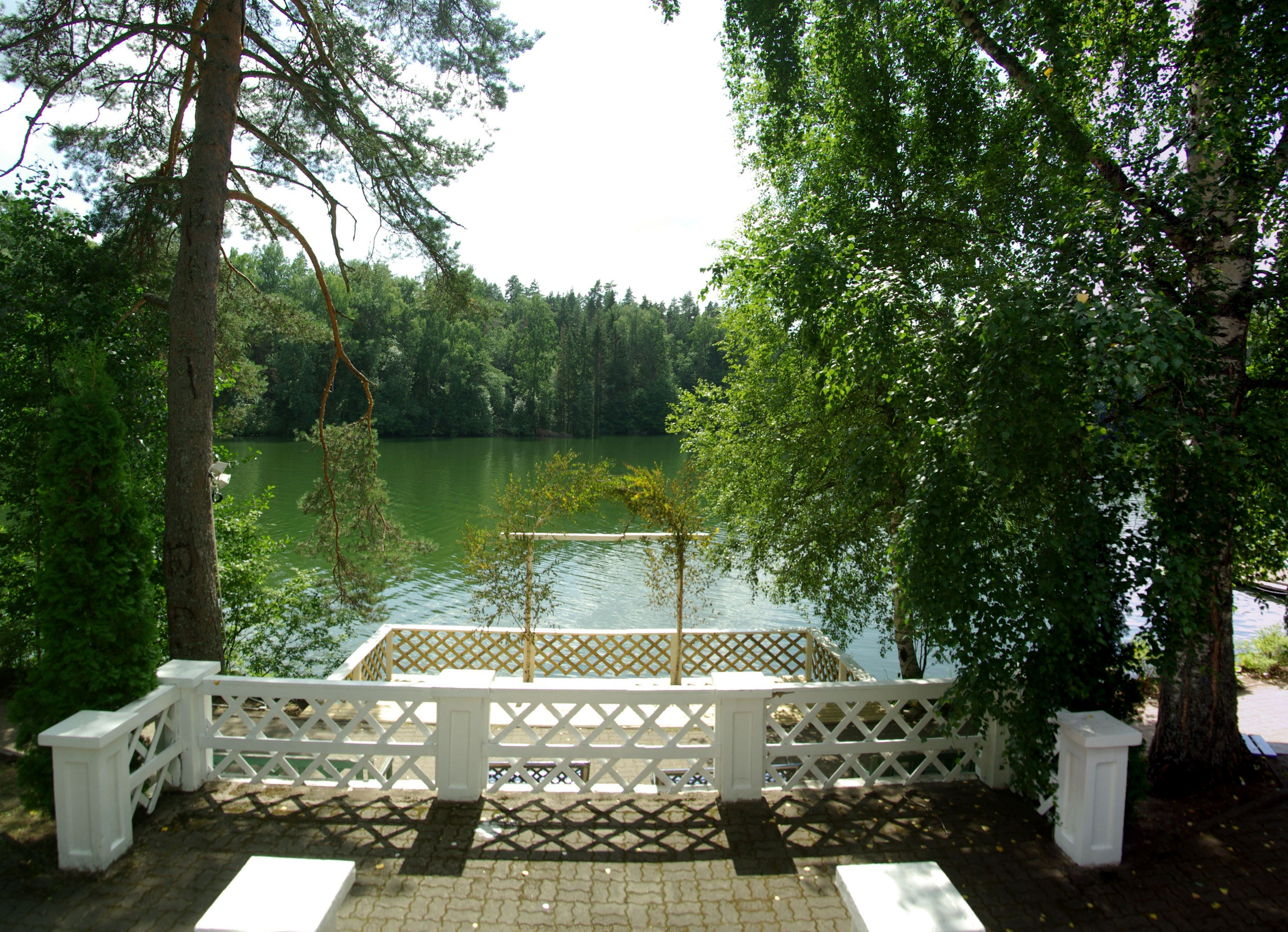
A terrace at the shores of Lake Purgatsi in Anija Parish, Estonia

Terraces are used primarily for leisure activity such as sitting, strolling, or resting. The term often applies to a raised area in front of a monumental building or structure, which is usually reached by a grand staircase and surrounded by a balustrade. A terrace may be supported by an embankment or solid foundation, either natural or man-made. But terraces are always open to the sky and may or may not be paved.

=== History and examples of terraces ===
Agricultural terracing can be traced back to prehistoric times, but architectural terracing is equally ancient. Examples of early architectural terracing in the Middle East have been found at Nahal Oren (a Natufian cultural site occupied between 13000 and 9834 BCE), at Tel Yarmut (2700 to 2200 BCE), and at Tel el-'Umeiri (600 BCE). Architectural terracing was widespread globally. For example, architectural (rather than agricultural) terracing also occurred on the island of Babeldaob in modern Palau in the Pacific Ocean.

Terraces are found the world over, throughout history. Terraces were used extensively throughout Greece in both public and private architecture, and rooftop terraces can be found at Knossos as early as 1700 BCE. Terraces were also built extensively in the Roman Empire, with terraces in front of monumental structures (such as temples) common throughout imperial history. Temples were terraced on the island of Java by at least 800 CE, and the practice spread to Cambodia. The first terrace stone temple in Cambodia was constructed at Bakong in 881 CE.

Terraces are often used for private residences. In traditional Thai homes (or "cluster houses"), the dwelling is built around a central terrace, or chaan. One or more "house cabins" (small, enclosed rooms) are placed around the edge of the terrace, and set about 40 centimetres (16 in) higher than the terrace to provide built-in bench seating. The terrace is often pierced in the center by a tree, which along with the house cabin roofs and walls provides shade, and may be decorated with large flat ceramic bowls of fish and water lilies or by potted plants.

Architectural theories for the use and design of terraces varies widely geographically and historically. In the early part of the 20th century, architects Henry and Theodore Hubbard argued that the basic function of a terrace was as an interesting base of an even more interesting building. Since the terrace was not the focal point of the structure, its design should be simple and it should command a view. More recently, architect Catherine Dee has noted that the terrace is most commonly used to link the structure to the landscape and as an extension of living space. According to architect Sophia Psarra, the terrace is one of the most commonly used forms of architecture in the 21st century, along with entrance halls, stairs, and corridors.

Landscape architect Russell Sturgis has observed that terraces tend to be used only in larger and more expensive gardens.

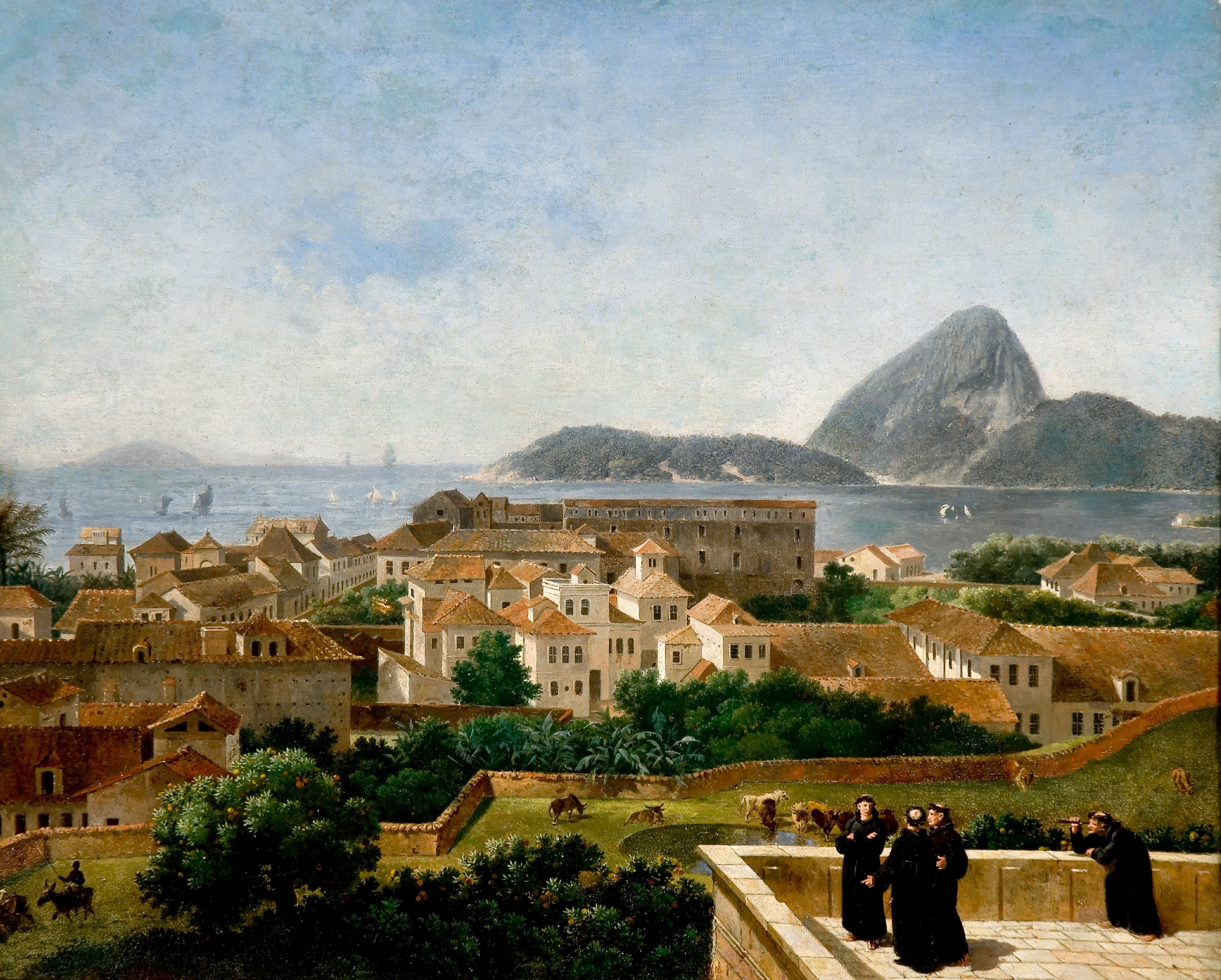
Franciscan friars look at the sea and city landscape from a terrace in Rio de Janeiro, Brazil, c. 1816

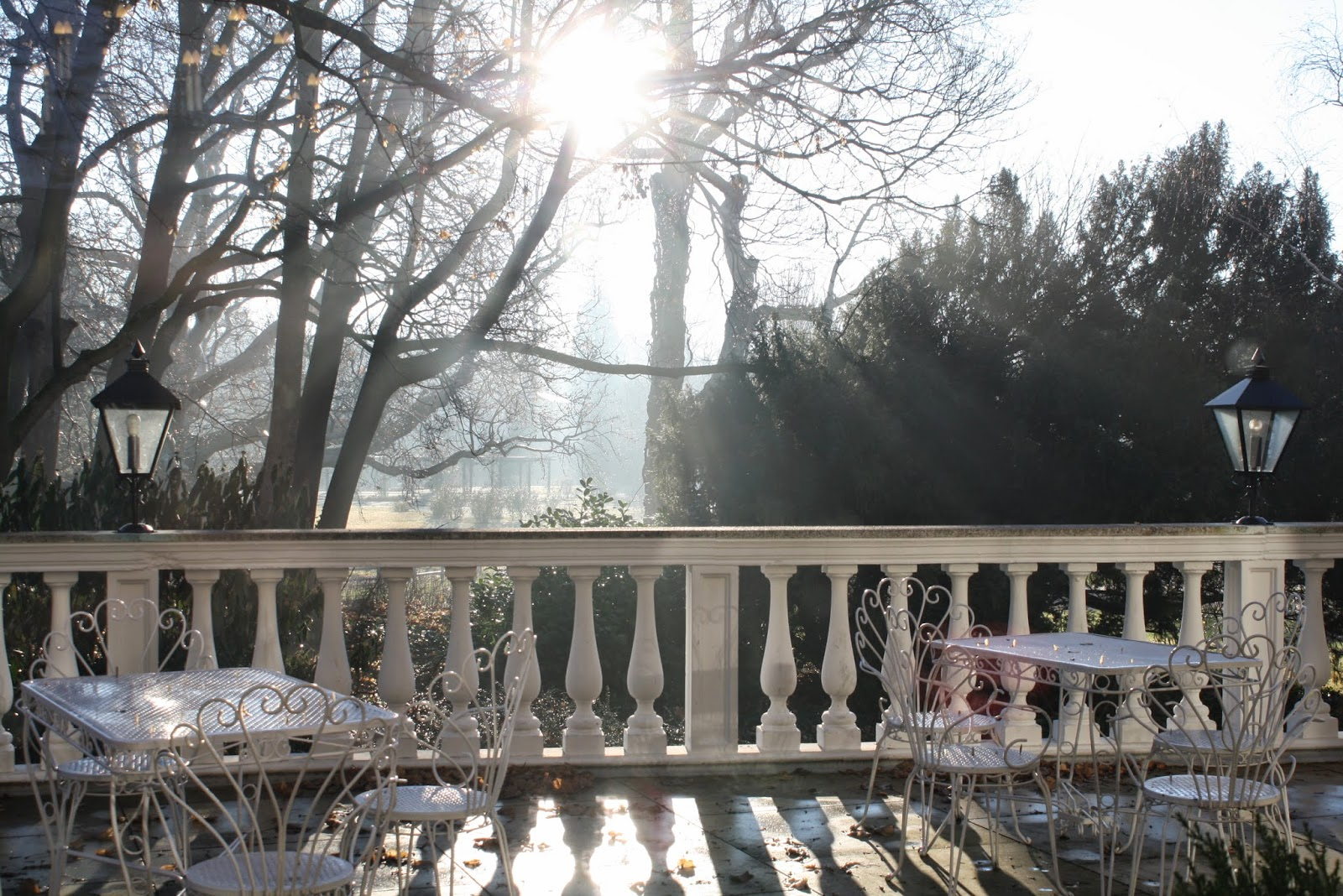
A terrace with balustrade in Baden, Austria

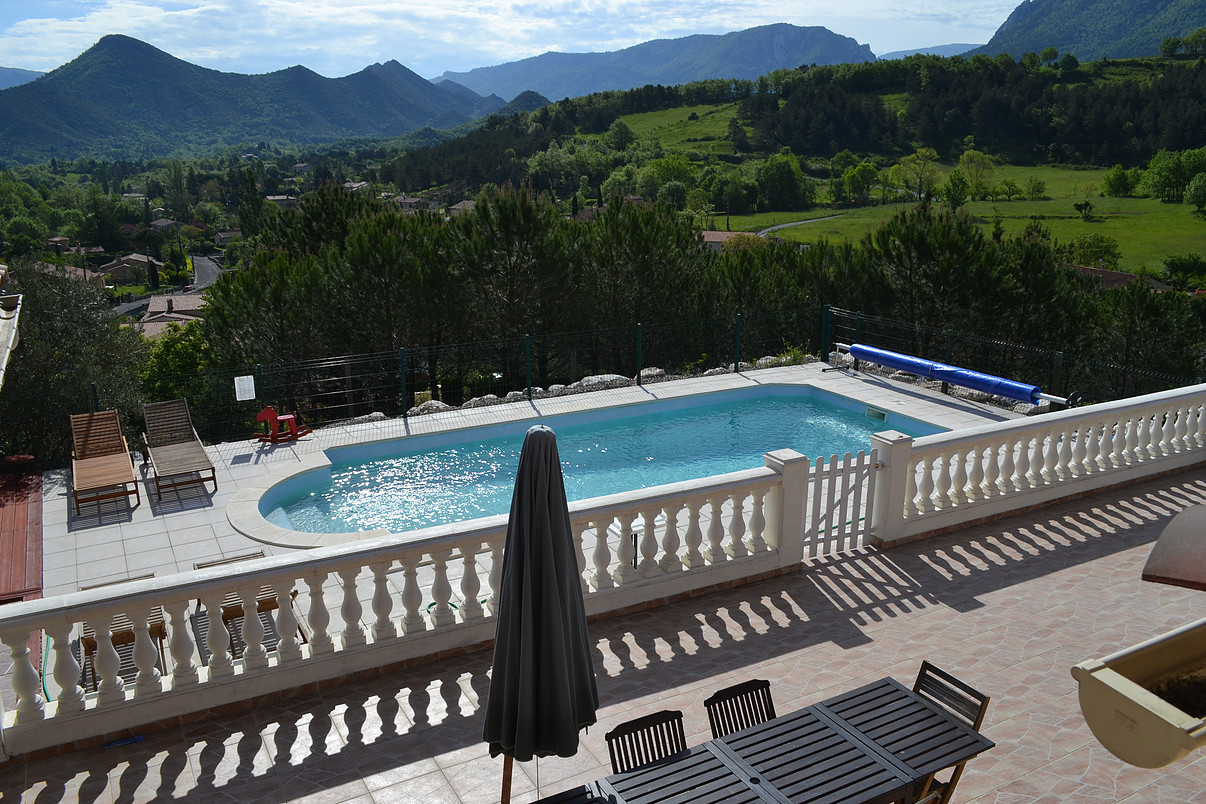
A photo of a terrace with annexed pool in Ginoles, France at Villa de Fleur.

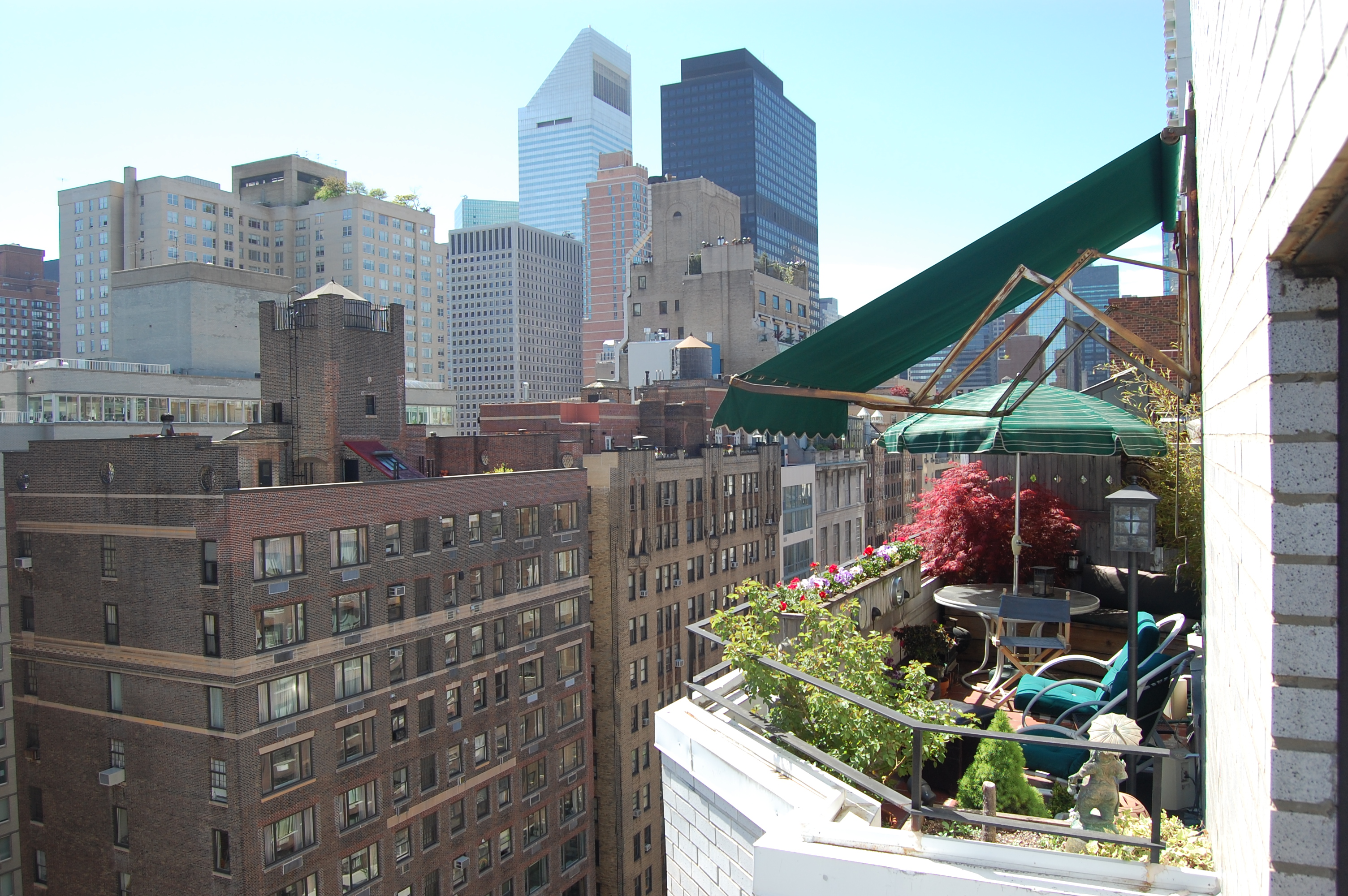
A setback terrace outside a 19th floor apartment on East 57th Street in New York.

== Roof terraces ==
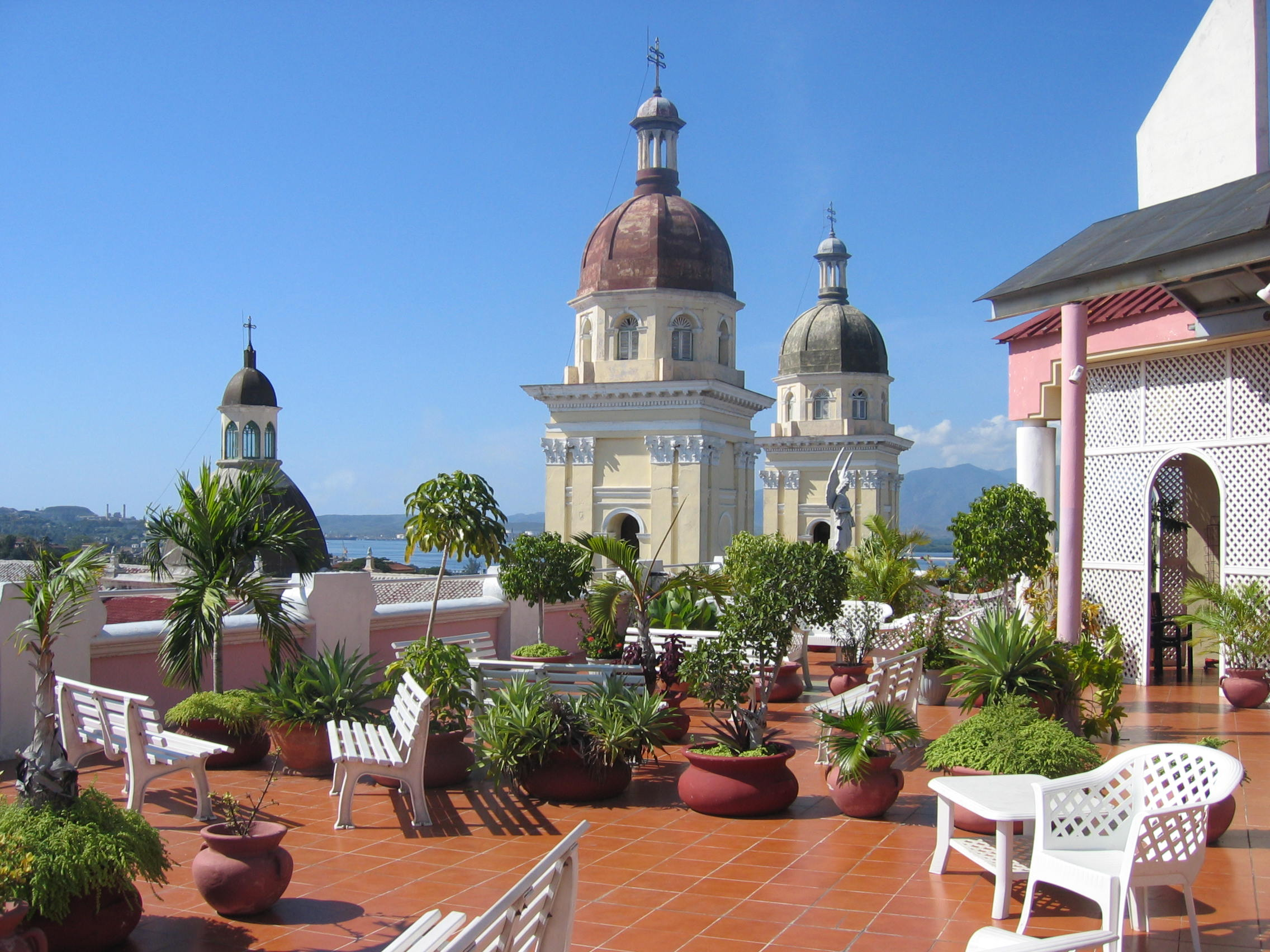
The roof terrace of the Casa Grande hotel in Santiago de Cuba

Terraces need not always protrude from a building; a flat roof area (which may or may not be surrounded by a balustrade) used for social activity is also known as a terrace. In Venice, Italy, for example, the rooftop terrace (or altana) is the most common form of terrace found. Developed around 1500 CE, it has changed little and consists of a wooden platform with small spaces between the floorboards. The altana was originally a place where laundry could be hung out to dry (hence the spaces in the flooring through which water could pass). However, the altana is now used primarily for social purposes.

== See also ==
- Balcony
- Band stand
- Deck
- Gazebo
- Hardscape
- Patio
- Pavilion
- Pergola
- Porch
- Terrace garden
- Verandah
