= Carbon filtering =

Filtering method

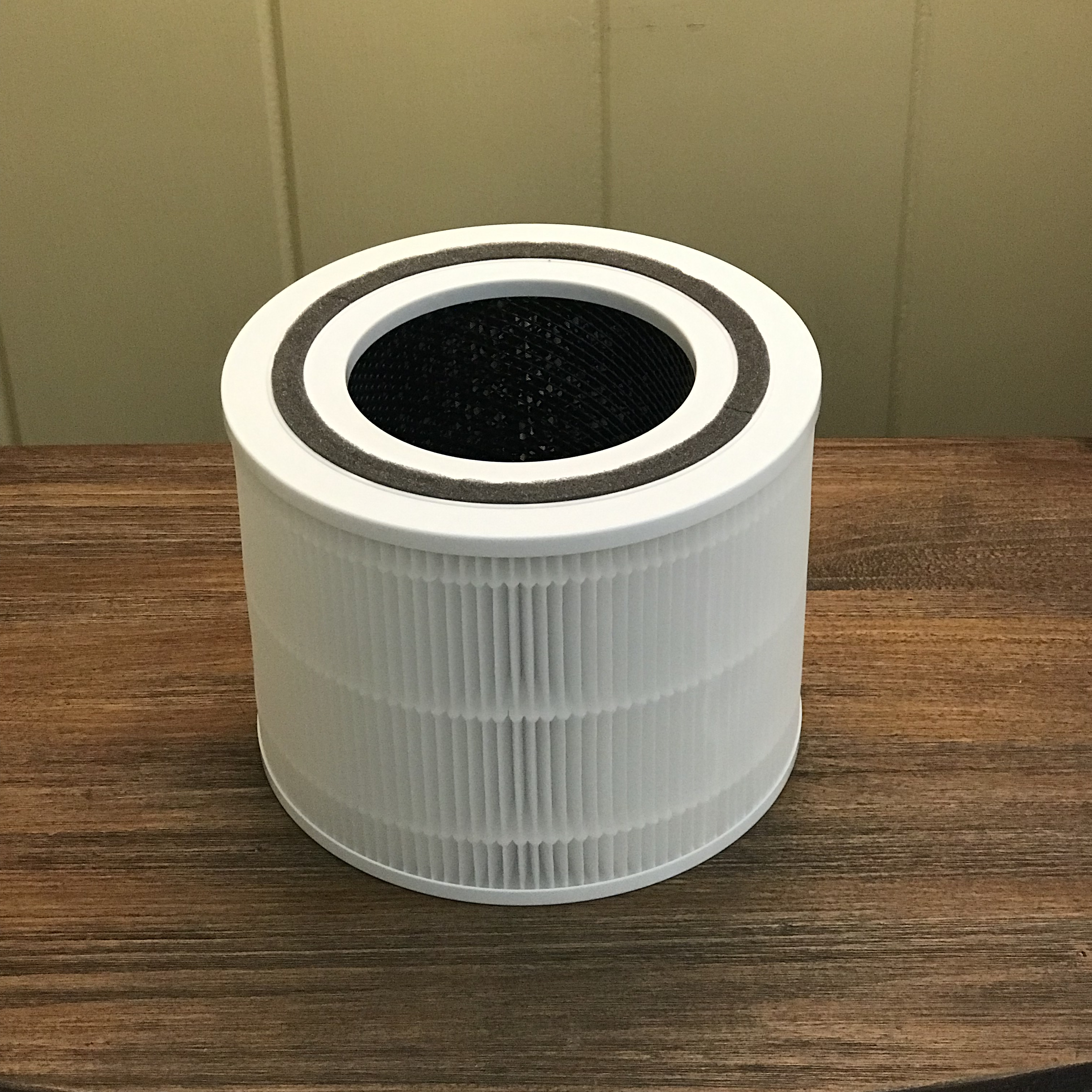
Air purifier HEPA filter with an activated carbon section in the middle

Carbon filtering is a method of filtering that uses a bed of activated carbon to remove impurities from a fluid using adsorption.

== Mechanism ==
Carbon filtering operates through adsorption, where pollutants in the fluid to be treated are trapped within the pore structure of a carbon substrate. The substrate consists of many carbon granules, each of which is highly porous. Consequently, the substrate possesses a large surface area that can trap contaminants. Activated carbon is typically used in filters because it has been treated to have a significantly higher surface area than untreated carbon. One gram of activated carbon has a surface area exceeding 3,000 m² (32,000 sq ft).

== Common uses ==
Carbon filtering is commonly used for water purification, air filtering and industrial gas processing, for example the removal of siloxanes and hydrogen sulfide from biogas. It is also used in a number of other applications, including respirator masks, the purification of sugarcane, some methods of coffee decaffeination, and in the recovery of precious metals, especially gold. It is also used in cigarette filters and in the EVAP used in cars.

When filtering water, charcoal carbon filters are most effective at removing chlorine, particles such as sediment, volatile organic compounds (VOCs), taste and odor. They are not effective at removing minerals, salts, and dissolved inorganic substances.

Filters containing an adsorbent or catalyst such as charcoal (carbon) may also remove odors and gaseous pollutants such as volatile organic compounds or ozone.

== Specifications ==
Each carbon filter is typically given a micron rating that specifies the size of particle which the filter can remove from a fluid. Typical particle sizes which can be removed by carbon filters range from 0.5 to 50 μm. The efficacy of a carbon filter depends not only on its particle size, but also on the rate of flow of fluid through the filter. For example, if a fluid is allowed to flow through the filter at a slower rate, the contaminants will be exposed to the filter media for a longer amount of time, which will tend to result in fewer impurities.

== See also ==
- Water filter
- List of waste-water treatment technologies
