= Point of use water filter =

Domestic drinking water filter

Point of use water filters are used in individual houses or offices to provide filtration of potable water close to the point of consumption. The related topic, point-of-use water treatment describes full-scale water treatment options and technologies designed to serve communities when municipal water treatment fails or is unavailable.

Probably the best known POU water filters are those installed in the plumbing in kitchens just prior to the tap and also jug filters where water is passed through a filter in a specially constructed plastic jug.

Such filters are typically based on ion exchange resins designed to remove calcium ions to reduce water hardness and removing any toxic heavy metal ions such as lead. Many filters also incorporate activated charcoal to eliminate excess chlorine and to reduce unwanted tastes and odours. They may also be effective in reducing concentrations of halogenated organic species that can be created through the halogenation of organic rich waters as part of the disinfection process at the municipal water treatment facility.

Filters incorporating reverse osmosis are also available and can be effective in removing many pathogenic organisms.

Point of use filters have limited capacity to modify water chemistry and typically require that treatment cartridges are replaced at regular intervals, especially in hard water areas.

== Benefits ==
POU filters are generally efficient at softening hard water and reducing lime scale in kitchen utensils, on shower heads and reducing water smear on shower enclosures provided that the treatment cartridges are regularly replaced.

They can also be efficient in removing heavy metal ions where these are present. However, modern municipal water treatment and modern plumbing standards mean that toxic metals concentrations are very rarely a significant issue. Even where such ions are detectable, they may be at concentrations below the effective treatment range of the filter

== Limitations ==
Although the technology in POU filters is generally robust, the limited contact time with the water stream and the technological limitations of the devices mean that the level of performance is not as great as the user may expect. Per- and polyfluoroalkyl substances (PFAS) may occur in some water supplies because of contamination of the water catchment. but a number of POU filters only offer a reduction of concentration down to 70 ng/L whereas the limit on municipal water treatment plant may be as low as 20 ng/L. In such cases the POU filter will be of no benefit.

== Disadvantages ==
=== Cost ===
All point of use filters incorporate technology that requires periodic exchange or replacement. For example, ion exchange units become exhausted and no longer work efficiently and activated carbon units become saturated with organic species and can no longer perform as designed. Because the levels of treatment may be undetectable by the user, many manufacturers recommend replacement of units on a regular basis. The cost of such units can be significant

=== Bacteriological contamination ===
Many filters are designed to remove chlorine from water to improve the smell and taste of the water. Removing the chlorine can allow bacteria and other microorganisms to colonise parts of the filter downstream of the chlorine removal and the stem of the tap or the shower hose and head. Such colonisation may pose health risks not present in the unfiltered water

== Certification in the United States ==
Three organizations are accredited by the American National Standards Institute, and each one of them certified products using American National Standard Institute/National Science Foundation standards. Each American National Standards Institute/National Science Foundation standard requires verification of contaminant reduction performance claims, an evaluation of the unit, including its materials and structural integrity, and a review of the product labels and sales literature. Each certifies that home water treatment units meet or exceed National Standard Institute/National Science Foundation and Environmental Protection Agency drinking water standards. American National Standard Institute/National Science Foundation standards are issued in two different sets, one for health concerns (such as removal of specific contaminants (Standard 53, Health Effects) and one for aesthetic concerns (Aesthetic Effects, such as improving taste or appearance of water). Certification from these organizations will specify one or both of these specific standards.

=== NSF International ===
NSF International as it is now known started out as the National Sanitation Foundation in 1944 at the University of Michigan School of Public Health. The NSF's water treatment Device Certification Program requires extensive product testing and unannounced audits of production facilities. One goal of this not for profit organization is to provide assurance to consumers that the water treatment devices they are purchasing meet the design, material, and performance requirements of national standards.

=== Underwriters Laboratories ===
Underwriters Laboratories, Inc., is an independent, accredited testing and certification organization that certifies home water treatment units which meet or exceed EPA and American National Standard Institute/National Science Foundation drinking water standards of contaminant reduction, aesthetic concerns, structural integrity, and materials safety.

=== Water Quality Association ===
The Water Quality Association is a trade organization that tests water treatment equipment, and awards its Gold Seal to systems that meet or exceed ANSI/NSF standards for contaminant reduction performance, structural integrity, and materials safety.

Filters that use reverse osmosis, those labeled as “absolute one micron filters,” or those labeled as certified by an American National Standards Institute (ANSI)- accredited organization to American National Standard Institute/National Science Foundation Standard 53 for “Cyst Removal” provide the greatest assurance of removing Cryptosporidium. As with all filters, follow the manufacturer's instructions for filter use and replacement.
