= Disc filter =

Type of water filter

A disc filter is a type of water filter used primarily in irrigation, similar to a screen filter, except that the filter cartridge is made of a number of plastic discs stacked on top of each other like a pile of poker chips. Each disc is covered with small grooves or bumps. The discs (or rings) each have a hole in the middle, forming a hollow cylinder in the middle of the stack. The water passes through the small passages in between and the impurities are trapped behind.

The filtration quality is based on the quantity and size of particles that the filtering element is able to retain. Higher quality filtration simply means cleaner water. This depends on the geometry of the channels, including the size, length, angle, and number of generated intersection points. The discs are typically color coded to denote the level of filtration. Filtration quality is usually measured in microns, based on the smallest size particle filtered. The typical range is from 25 microns for the finest level of filtration to 400 microns for the coarsest. Sometimes the filtration quality is given as the equivalent mesh size of a comparable screen filter. Typical mesh sizes range from 40 to 600. When using mesh sizes, 40 is the coarsest and 600 is the finest or highest level of filtration.

Disc filters range in size from small units with a 3/4" inlet and outlet used for landscape drip irrigation systems to very large banks of multiple filters manifolded together used for filtering large volumes of water for agricultural and industrial applications.

Some disc filters, especially the smaller ones, must be taken apart and cleaned by hand. Many of the larger ones can be backflushed in such a way that the discs are able to separate and spin during the cleaning cycle. In some cases, a booster pump may be required for backflushing. Disc filters can be used for many types of contaminants, including fine sand and organic matter. However, when used to filter organic matter, they will clog more quickly than a media filter and will have to be cleaned more often. One advantage that the disc filter has over the media filter is that it can backflush more quickly with less flush water.

Disc filters used in agricultural irrigation are covered by the ISO 9912-2 standard.

== History ==
The disc filter was originally developed in 1936 to filter hydraulic fluid in the B-17 bomber. In these filters, the discs were made of stainless steel and brass. In the 1960s, this type of filter began to be used in Israel to filter irrigation water.
