= Softscape =

Softscape is the live horticultural elements of a landscape. Softscaping can include flowers, plants, shrubs, trees, flower beds, and duties like weed/nuisance management, grading, planting, mowing, trimming, aerating, spraying, and digging for everything from plants and shrubs to flower beds. Wheelbarrows and manual tools like rakes, shovels, picks, and gas power tools are commonly used. The term has been popularized in recent pop culture (2006 onwards) on television shows such as Home & Garden Television. The purpose of softscape is to lend character to the landscaping, create an aura, ambience, and reflect the sensibilities of the inhabitants.

Softscape stands in contrast to hardscape, which contains inanimate objects of a landscape such as pavers, stones, rocks, planter boxes, arbors, water features as well as structures of wood and natural stone and concrete, like retaining walls, patios, fences and decks, pergolas, and stairs.

== See also ==
- Greenskeeper
- Landscape design
