= Cloth filter =

Method to decontaminate drinking water

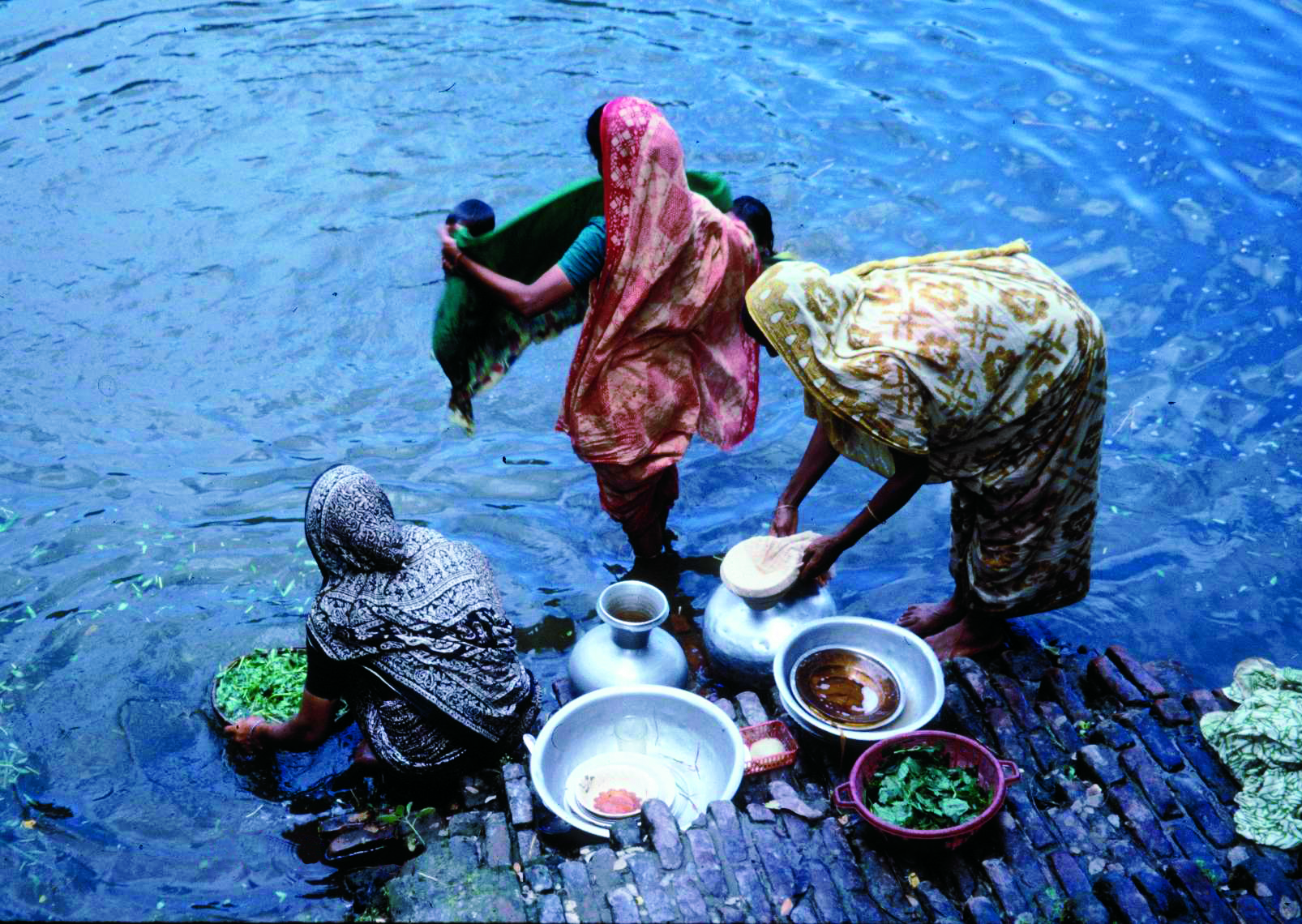
Women at a village pond in Matlab, Bangladesh washing utensils and vegetables. The woman on the right is putting a sari filter onto a water-collecting pot (or kalash) to filter water for drinking.

A cloth filter is a simple and cost-effective appropriate technology method for reducing the contamination of drinking water, developed for use mainly in Bangladesh. Water collected in this way has a greatly reduced pathogen count. Though not always perfectly safe, it is an improvement for poor people with limited options.

Filtering water to free it from micro-organisms has been an age-old practice among Jains who carefully remove the micro-organisms in the cloth through filtered water in order to follow doctrine of Ahimsa or non-violence, preventing pain to any living creature.

== Method ==
The method used in Bangladesh is as follows: cloth is folded to make four or eight layers and the folded cloth is placed over a wide-mouthed container used to collect surface water. After use, it is usually sufficient to rinse the cloth and dry it in the sun for a couple of hours. In the monsoon seasons, it may be advisable to use a cheap disinfectant to decontaminate the material.

The preferred cloth is used cotton sari cloth. Other types of clean, used cloth can be used with some effect, though the effectiveness will vary significantly. Used cloth is more effective than new cloth, as the repeated washing reduces the space between the fibers.

== Effectiveness ==
The cloth is effective because most pathogens are attached to particles and plankton, particularly a type of zooplankton called copepods, within the water. By passing the water through an effective filter, most cholera bacteria and other pathogens are removed. It has been demonstrated to greatly reduce cholera infections in poor villages where disinfectants and fuel for boiling are difficult to get.

In sub-Saharan Africa where guinea worm infections (dracunculiasis) are endemic, infection is prevented by use of a nylon mesh with pore size of approximately 150 μm to filter out the copepods that host the parasite.

An old folded cotton sari creates a smaller effective mesh size (approximately 20-μm). This should be small enough to remove all zooplankton, most phytoplankton, and thus a large proportion of the cholera in the water (99%, according to laboratory studies). However, the nylon net with the larger mesh size was found to be "almost equally effective."

The cloth filter provides less than ideal purification on its own - usually filtering is an initial step, to be followed by further disinfection. However, where there are no other options, water professionals may consider that it is "of course, better than nothing"

== Background ==
The cloth filter has been studied and reported on by Rita Colwell and Anwar Huq from the University of Maryland Biotechnology Institute, together with other researchers from the United States and Bangladesh. They report that: "It is common practice in villages in Bangladesh to use cloth, frequently a flat, unfolded piece of an old sari, to filter home-prepared drinks".

The researchers studied the application of this technique to drinking water, with folded cloth. They studied the pore size of the cloth, the effect of folding the cloth on the effective pore size, the ability of the cloth to remove particles and plankton, as well as the effect on rates of cholera when used in a Bangladesh village.

== See also ==
- Filtration
- Pile Cloth Media Filtration
