= Hardscape =

Hard landscape materials in the built environment structures

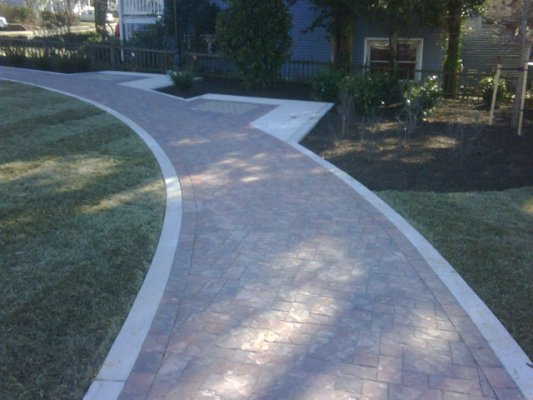
Sidewalks are a common form of hardscaping

Hardscape is hard landscape materials in the built environment structures that are incorporated into a landscape. This can include paved areas, driveways, retaining walls, sleeper walls, stairs, walkways, and any other landscaping made up of hard wearing materials such as wood, stone, and concrete, as opposed to softscape, the horticultural elements of a landscape.

Hard landscaping involves projects that cover the entirety of the yard and that are necessary before soft landscaping features come into play. Hard landscaping alters the foundation of the yard, the "bricks and mortar" so to speak; only when this is completed can the landscaper begin to focus on the softscape features of the yard, such as lawn, floral plantings, trees and shrubs. One key feature of hard landscaping has to do with the absorption of water – something that is of great importance given the climate. Hard landscaping ensures that worrying about water after heavy rain or snowfall is not an issue. The right water absorption and irrigation system installed through hard landscaping, coupled with hard materials that safely move water away from the property can ensure that soil movement is never a problem and that the yard stays a drier, enjoyable living space, rather than a wet and muddy bog. There are soft landscaping options that can help to achieve this, but the bulk of this is achieved through hard landscaping.

From an urban planning perspective, hardscapes can include very large features, such as paved roads, driveways or fountains, and even small pools or ponds that do not exceed a certain safe height. Most water features are hardscapes because they require a barrier to retain the water, instead of letting it drain into the surrounding soil.

Hardscaping allows the erection of man-made landscaping features that would otherwise be impossible due to soil erosion, including some that compensate for large amounts of human traffic that would cause wear on bare earth or grass. For example, sheer vertical features are possible.

Without nearby bare soil, or natural drainage channels, swales or culverts, hardscape with an impervious surface requires artificial methods of drainage or surface runoff to carry off the water that would normally be absorbed into the ground as groundwater and prevent premature wear to itself. Lack of capacity, or poorly planned or executed drainage or grading of the surface can cause problems after severe storms or heavy extended periods of rain fall, such as flooding, washout, mud flows, sink holes, accelerated erosion, wet rot to wood elements, drowning of plants trees and shrubs, and even foundation problems to an adjacent home such as cracking the foundation, basement flooding due to water infiltration, and pest infiltration, such as ants and other insects entering through damaged areas.

== Regulations and licensing ==
=== Australia ===
Hardscape landscaping in Queensland, Australia is a licensed qualification called Structural Landscaping, which is divided into two classes of licenses: Trade Contractor Structural Landscaper, and a Builder restricted to Structural Landscaping, referred to as the "jack of all trades" due to its large scope of works. These Structural Landscaping licenses include the erection and fabrication of decking, fences, carports, pergolas, paving and the construction of retaining walls.

Hardscape landscaping in New South Wales, Within NSW a contractor must hold a relevant trade qualification such as a certificate III in Landscape Construction or Certificate III in Horticulture. Once the trades person has obtained their formal qualification they will be able to apply for a NSW contractors license which will enable them to carry out works over $5,000 including GST. A NSW contractors license includes works such as retaining walls, pergolas, fencing, driveways & decks.
