= Screen filter =

Filter to remove macroscopic contaminants from water

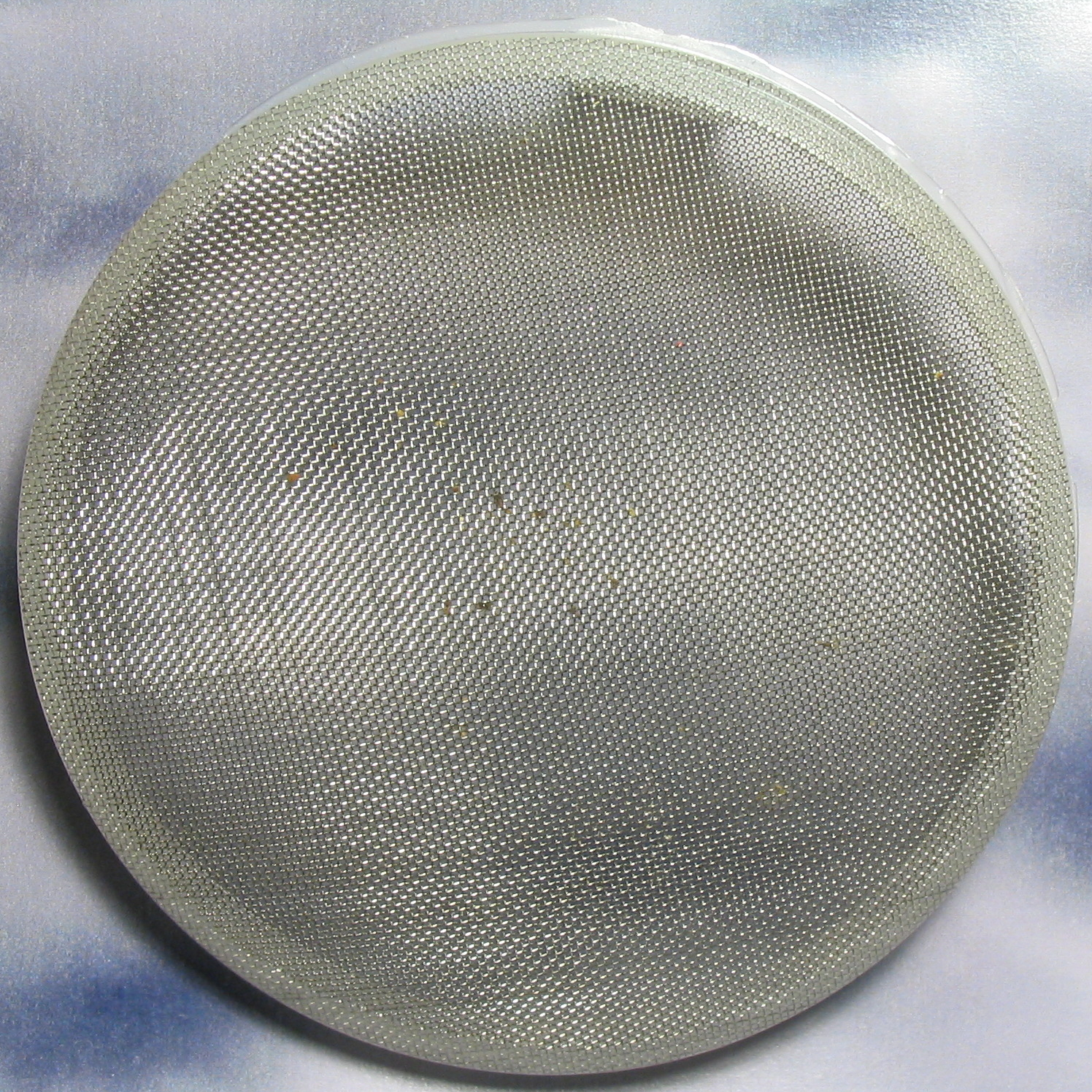
Filter screen

A screen filter is a type of water purification using a rigid or flexible screen to separate sand and other fine particles out of water for irrigation or industrial applications. These are generally not recommended for filtering out organic matter such as algae, since these types of contaminants can be extruded into spaghetti-like strings through the filter if enough pressure drop occurs across the filter surface. Typical screen materials include stainless steel (mesh), polypropylene, nylon and polyester.

== Use ==
Self-cleaning screen filters incorporate an automatic backwash cycle to overcome these limitations. Backwash cycles are far more frequent when compared to a media filter with similar capacity, and each backwash requires far less water to perform. Their ability to quickly remove contaminants from water before they leach their nutrients make such filters popular choices for recirculating aquaculture systems. They have also become popular in closed loop industrial systems such as cooling tower, heat exchanger, and other equipment protection applications. Similar devices with larger openings designed only to keep out large objects are called strainers.

Stainless-steel strainers are used in industrial, municipal, and irrigation applications, and can be designed for very high flow rates. When paired with a controller and flush valve, a strainer can be fully automated. Suspended particles collect on the inside of the screen, and the flush valve opens to expel the buildup. This eliminates the need for manual cleaning of the strainer element.

== See also ==
- Traveling screen
