= Purification of water =

Purification of water may refer to any of the following.

- Water purification, the large scale production of clean water for supply to consumer taps and industry.
- Distilled water, the use of distillation to remove contaminants from water
- Portable water purification, techniques for use in emergencies or away from conventional sources of clean water
- Water filter, devices used for small scale quality improvement, often in domestic situations
- Deionized water, industrial production of ultra pure water
- Reverse osmosis, a technique for producing potable water from highly contaminated sources.
- Sewage treatment, treatment of sewage to remove contaminants
