= Electrodeionization =

Water purification method

Electrodeionization (EDI) is a water treatment technology that utilizes DC power, ion exchange membranes, and ion exchange resin to deionize water, thereby removing trace minerals that function as anions and cations. By itself, it does not remove other contaminants, including pathogens, organic compounds, or dissolved gases. EDI is typically employed as a polishing treatment following reverse osmosis (RO), and is used in the production of ultrapure water. It differs from other RO polishing methods, such as chemically regenerated mixed beds, by operating continuously without chemical regeneration.

Electrodeionization can be used to produce high purity water, reaching electrical resistivity values as high as 18.2 MΩ/cm.

Electrodeionization (EDI) integrates three distinct processes:

1. Electrolysis: A continuous DC current directs positive and negative ions toward electrodes with opposing electrical charges. The electrical potential draws anions and cations from diluting chambers, through cation or anion exchange membranes, into concentrating chambers.
2. Ion exchange: An ion exchange resin fills the diluting chambers. As water flows through the resin bed, cations and anions become affixed to resin sites.
3. Electrochemical regeneration: Unlike chemically regenerated mixed beds, EDI accomplishes regeneration through water splitting induced by the continuous electric current. Water splits from H_{2}O into H^{+} and OH^{−} to effectively regenerate the resin without the need for external chemical additives.

EDI is sometimes labeled "continuous electrodeionization" (CEDI) because the electric current continually regenerates the ion exchange resin mass.

== Quality of the feed ==
To maximize the purity of product water, EDI feedwater needs pre-treatment, usually done via reverse osmosis. When fed with feedwater that is low in total dissolved solids (e.g., purified by RO), the product can reach very high purity levels. The contents of the feedwater must be kept within certain parameters to prevent damage to the EDI instrument.

Common feedwater quality concerns are:

- Hardness, which is often limited to 1 part per million (ppm) of CaCO_{3} or corresponding molecule, with limited exceptions up to 2 ppm.
- Silica content (SiO_{2}), which generally must be no more than 1 ppm in most EDI cells or 2 ppm in thin-cell modules.
- CO_{2}, which must be monitored to prevent excessive loading of anion exchange resin.
- TOC, which can foul resins and membranes, must be minimized.
- Chlorine, ozone, and other oxidizers can oxidize resins and membranes and create permanent damage, and must be minimized.

== History ==
Electrodeionization was developed in the early 1950s to eliminate or minimize the concentration polarization phenomenon present in electrolysis systems of the time. A patent on the technology was filed in 1953, and subsequent publications popularized the technology.

The technology was limited in application because of the low tolerance of total dissolved solids, hardness and organics. During the 1970s and 1980s, reverse osmosis became a preferred technology to ion exchange resin for high TDS waters. As RO gained popularity, EDI emerged as a suitable polishing technology. Packaged RO and EDI systems began to displace chemically regenerated ion exchange systems.

In 1977 Harry O'Hare built and tested a working EDI device then filed EDI patents.

In 1986 and 1989, several companies developed new EDI devices. The initial devices were large, costly, and often unreliable. However, in the 1990s, smaller and less costly modular designs were introduced. Nonetheless, these designs and their contemporary descendants still face limitations such as cost and limited operational envelope.

== Applications ==
In the electronics industry, deionized water is used to rinse components during manufacturing. This is necessary to avoid potential short circuits that could destroy electronic chips. As electronic chips are very small, there is little free space between component elements and unwanted electricity may conduct across components via even a small number of ions, causing a short circuit. Using deionized water to clean the components helps minimize the ions on their surfaces and thus minimizes short circuits.

In the pharmaceutical industry, the presence of unwanted ions in water used in drug development can lead to unwanted side reactions and introduce harmful impurities.

In power generation, the presence of ions in boiler feedwater can lead to the buildup of solids or the degradation of boiler walls, both of which can lower boiler efficiency and present safety hazards.

Due to the large financial and safety concerns present in these three industries, their economic demand for highly pure water provides the bulk of the demand for EDI devices and development.

Electrodeionization systems have also been applied to the removal of heavy metals from different types of wastewater from mining, electroplating, and nuclear processes. The primary ions removed in these processes are chromium, copper, cobalt, and caesium, though EDI sees use in the removal of others as well.

== Theory ==
The electrodes in an electrochemical cell are each classified as either an anode or a cathode. An anode is an electrode at which electrons leave the cell and oxidation occurs, while a cathode is an electrode at which electrons enter the cell and reduction occurs. Each electrode may become either an anode or a cathode depending on the voltage applied to the cell.

Each deionization cell consists of an electrode and an electrolyte with ions that undergo either oxidation or reduction. Because they commonly consist of ions in solution, the electrolytes are often known as "ionic solutions", but molten and solid electrolytes are also possible.

Water passes between an anode and a cathode. Ion-selective membranes allow positive ions to separate from the water toward the negative electrode and negative ions toward the positive electrode. As a result, the ions cannot escape the cell and deionized water is produced.

When using a current that is higher than necessary for the movement of the ions, a portion of the incident water will be split, forming hydroxide (OH^{−}) anions and hydrogen (H^{+}) cations. These species will replace the impurity anions and cations in the resin. This process is called "in situ regeneration" of the resin. Because this replacement occurs alongside the deionization process it allows for continuous purification, as opposed to deionization techniques that require a pause in operation to chemically regenerate ion exchange resins.

The purpose of the ion exchange resin is to maintain a stable conductance across the feedwater. Without the resin, ions could be removed initially, but the conductance would drop dramatically as the concentration of ions decreases. With lower conductance, the electrodes would become less able to efficiently direct the flow of electrons across the cell, whereas with the addition of resin and thus a steady conductance, electron flow remains steady and ensures a steady rate of ion removal. With a resin, therefore, the final remaining ion concentrations in the processed water can be lower by orders of magnitude.

== Installation scheme ==
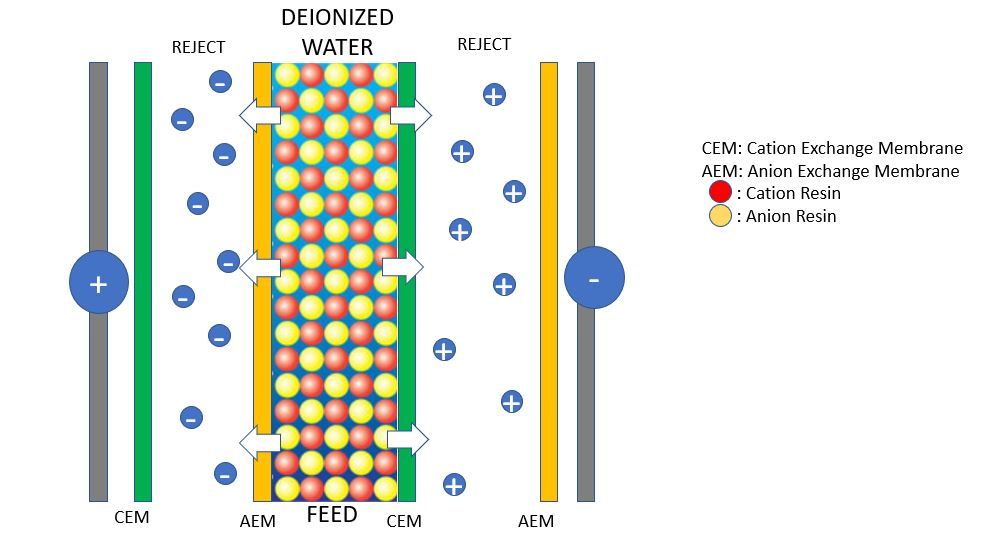
Electrodeionization installation scheme

The typical EDI installation has the following components: electrodes, anion exchange membranes, cation exchange membranes, and resin. The simplest configurations comprise three compartments. To increase production intensity or efficiency, the number of compartments or cells can be increased as desired.

Once the system is installed and feedwater begins to flow through it, cations flow toward the cathode and anions flow toward the anode. Only anions can go through the anion exchange membrane, and only cations can go through the cation exchange membrane. This configuration allows anions and cations to flow in only one direction because of the selectivity of the membranes and the electrical forces, rendering the feedwater relatively free of ions. It also allows for the separate collection of cation and anion concentration flows, creating the opportunity for more selective waste disposal, recycling, or reuse; this is especially useful in the removal of heavy metal cations.

How Does EDI Work?

== See also ==
- Electrodialysis
- Ionization
- Purified water
- Water purification
- Water treatment
