= Total carbon =

Total carbon (TC) is an analytical parameter representing the concentration of carbon in a sample. TC includes carbon in any form, whether organic or inorganic, volatile or fixed, dissolved or suspended. In many application areas, rather than TC, a parameter representing of subset of TC is measured; examples include Total organic carbon (TOC), Particulate inorganic carbon (PIC), and Dissolved organic carbon (DOC).

== See also ==
- Total nitrogen
