= Distilled water =

Water purified by condensing it from steam

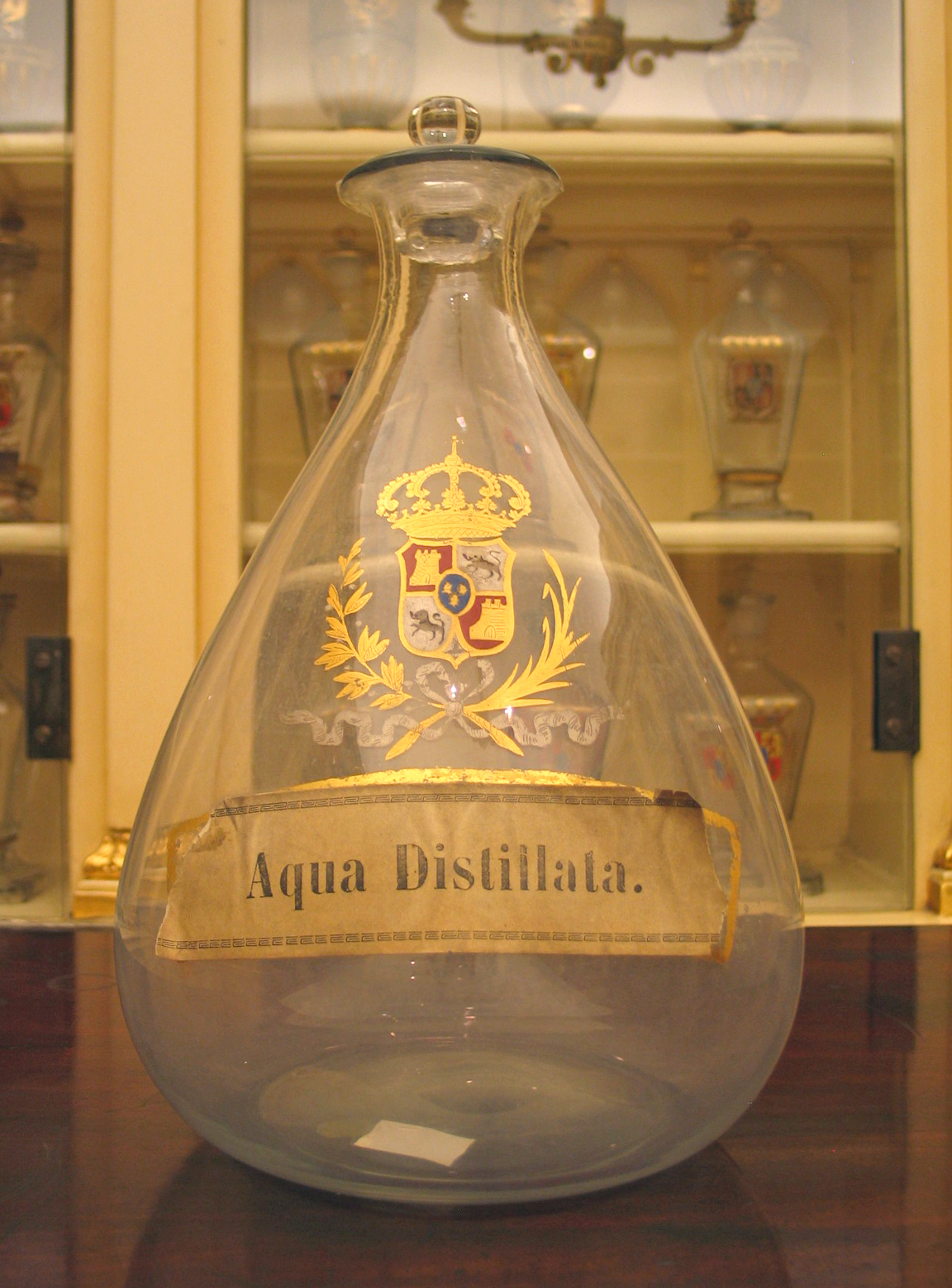
Bottle for distilled water in the Real Farmacia in Madrid

Distilled water is water that has been purified by boiling it into vapor and condensing the vapor back into liquid in a separate container. Any impurities in the original water, such as non-volatile or mineral components, that do not boil below or near the boiling point of water remain in the original container. For example, water escaping as steam from a boiler of heating system or steam engine, leaves behind any dissolved materials, which leads to mineral deposits known as boiler scale.

In general, non-purified water can leave behind mineral deposits, or could cause or interfere with chemical reactions. Distillation is a method for removing impurities from water and other fluids. Distilled water has not been proven to be healthier for drinking than hard water.

== History ==
=== Pre-modern history ===
Drinking water has been distilled from seawater since at least about AD 200, when the process was clearly described by Alexander of Aphrodisias. Its history predates this, as a passage in Aristotle's Meteorologica refers to the distillation of water. Captain Israel Williams of the Friendship (1797) improvised a way to distill water, which he described in his journal.

=== World War II ===
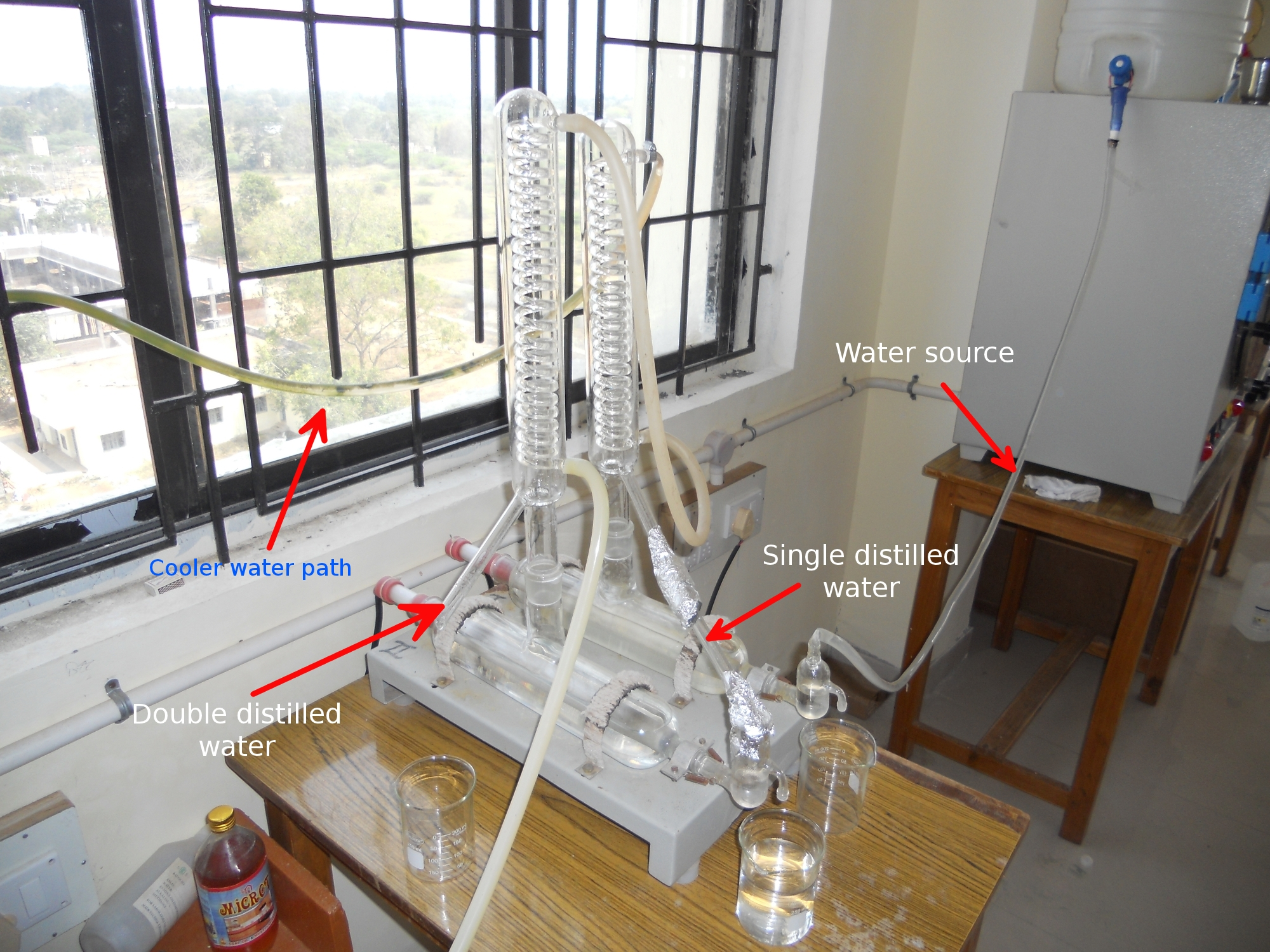
Typical laboratory distillation unit

Until World War II, distilling seawater to produce fresh water was time-consuming and expensive in fuel. A common saying was: "It takes one gallon of fuel to make one gallon of fresh water." Shortly before the war, Dr. R. V. Kleinschmidt developed a compression still, which became known as the Kleinschmidt still, for extracting fresh water from seawater or contaminated water. By compressing the steam produced by boiling water, 175 US gal (660 L; 146 imp gal) of fresh water could be extracted from seawater for every gallon (3.8 L; 0.83 imp gal) of fuel used.

During World War II, Kleinschmidt stills became standard on Allied ships and on trailer mounts for armies. This method was in widespread use in ships and portable water distilling units during the latter half of the century.

=== Post-World War II ===
Modern vessels now use flash-type evaporators to boil seawater, heating the water to between 70 and 80 °C (158 and 176 °F) and evaporating the water in a vacuum. This is then collected as condensation before being stored.

Distilling water with commercial equipment will almost completely remove all dissolved minerals such as calcium, magnesium, sodium, fluoride, potassium, iron, and zinc leaving a TDS of <1PPM, and reduce its electrical conductivity to <2 μS/cm. Typical tap water has electrical conductivity in the range of 200–800 μS/cm. The pH of distilled water is always slightly lower than 7 (neutral) because distilled water will absorb small amounts of carbon dioxide gas from the atmosphere which forms traces of carbonic acid and lowers the pH of distilled water to around 5.8 pH (very weakly acidic).

Solar stills can be relatively simple to design and build, with cheap materials.

== Applications ==
=== Industrial applications ===
Distilled water can be used in steam irons for pressing clothes to minimize the build-up of limescale in hard water areas shortening the lifespan of steam irons. Some steam irons have built-in filters to remove minerals from the water, which makes it possible to use standard tap water.

Ions commonly found in tap water tend to drastically reduce lifespans of lead–acid batteries used in cars and trucks. These ions are not acceptable in automotive cooling systems because they corrode internal engine components and deplete typical antifreeze anti-corrosion additives.

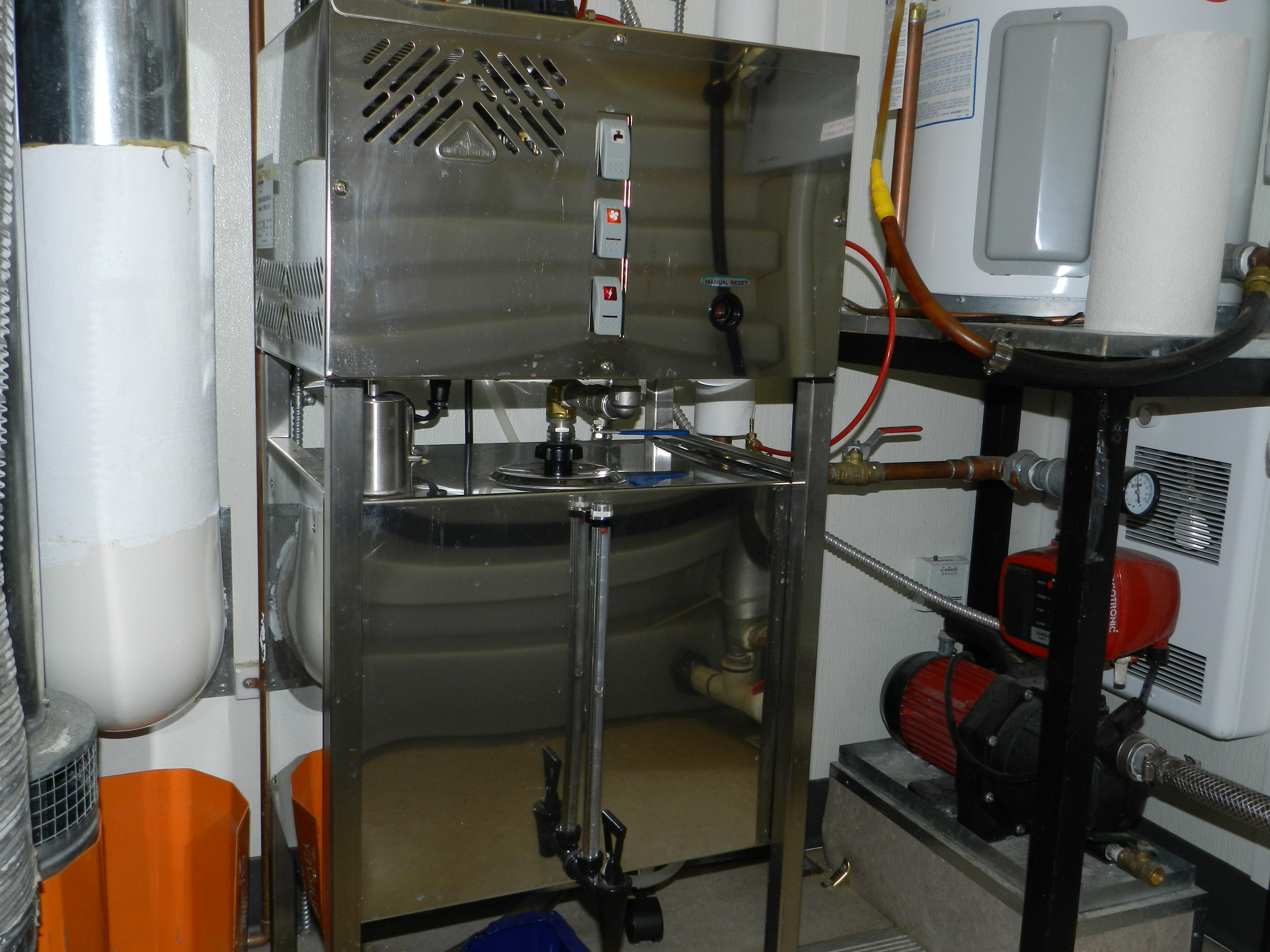
A boiling water distiller. Boiling tank on top and holding tank on the bottom.

Distilled water can increase the density of the air to assist early airplane jet engines during takeoff in 'hot and high' atmospheric conditions, as was used on the early Boeing 707.

Low-volume humidifiers such as cigar humidors can use distilled water to avoid mineral deposits.

=== Medical and biological applications ===
Controlled impurities as well as equipment reliability are critically important in medical applications where, for example, distilled water is used in continuous positive airway pressure (CPAP) machines to humidify air for breathing. Distilled water will not leave contaminants behind when the humidifier in the CPAP machine evaporates the water.

Certain biological applications require controlled impurities, especially in experiments. For example, distilling water to be added to an aquarium would remove known and unknown non-volatile contaminants. Living things require specific minerals; adding distilled water to an ecosystem, such as an aquarium, would reduce the concentration of these minerals. Fish and other living things that have evolved to survive in lakes and oceans should be expected to thrive at mineral ranges found in their original habitat.

=== Drinking ===
Bottled distilled water can usually be found in supermarkets or pharmacies, and home water distillers are available as well. Water purification, such as distillation, is especially important in regions where water resources or tap water is not suitable for ingesting without boiling or chemical treatment.

Municipal water supplies almost always contain trace components at levels which are regulated to be safe for consumption. Some other components such as trace levels of aluminium may result from the treatment process. Fluoride and other ions are not removed through conventional water filter treatments. However, distillation eliminates most impurities.

Distilled water is also used for drinking water in arid seaside areas lacking sufficient freshwater, via desalination of seawater.

It is possible for brewers to blend distilled water with hard water to mimic the soft waters of Plzeň.

== Health effects ==
Distilled water has not been proven to be healthier for drinking than hard water. Magnesium, calcium, and other nutrients in water can help to protect against nutritional deficiency. The consumption of hard water (water with minerals) is associated with beneficial cardiovascular effects. As noted in the American Journal of Epidemiology, consumption of hard drinking water is negatively correlated with atherosclerotic heart disease.

Recommendations for magnesium have been put at a minimum of 10 mg/L with 20–30 mg/L optimum; for calcium a 20 mg/L minimum and a 40–80 mg/L optimum, and a total water hardness (adding magnesium and calcium) of 2–4 mmol/L. At water hardness above 5 mmol/L, higher incidence of gallstones, kidney stones, urinary stones, arthrosis, and arthropathies have been observed. For fluoride the concentration recommended for dental health is 0.5–1.0 mg/L, with a maximum guideline value of 1.5 mg/L to avoid dental fluorosis.

Water filtration and distillation devices are becoming increasingly common in households. Municipal water supplies often have minerals added or have trace impurities at levels which are regulated to be safe for consumption. Many of these additional impurities, such as volatile organic compounds, fluoride, and an estimated >75,000 other chemical compounds are not removed through conventional filtration. However, distillation and reverse osmosis eliminate nearly all of these impurities.

The drinking of distilled water as a replacement for drinking water has been discouraged for health reasons. Distilled water lacks minerals and ions, such as calcium, that play key roles in biological functions, such as in nervous system homeostasis, and are normally found in potable water. The lack of naturally occurring minerals in distilled water has raised some concerns. The Journal of General Internal Medicine published a study on the mineral contents of different waters available in the US. The study found that "drinking water sources available to North Americans may contain high levels of calcium, magnesium, and sodium and may provide clinically important portions of the recommended dietary intake of these minerals". It encouraged people to "check the mineral content of their drinking water, whether tap or bottled, and choose water most appropriate for their needs". Since distilled water is devoid of minerals, mineral intake through dieting is needed to maintain good health.

== Alternatives ==
In chemical and biological laboratories, as well as in industry, in some appliances, deionized water or reverse osmosis water can be used instead of distilled water as a cheaper alternative. If exceptionally high-purity water is required, double distilled water is used.

== See also ==
- Atmospheric water generator
- Deionized water
- Heavy water
- Ultrapure water
