= Purified water =

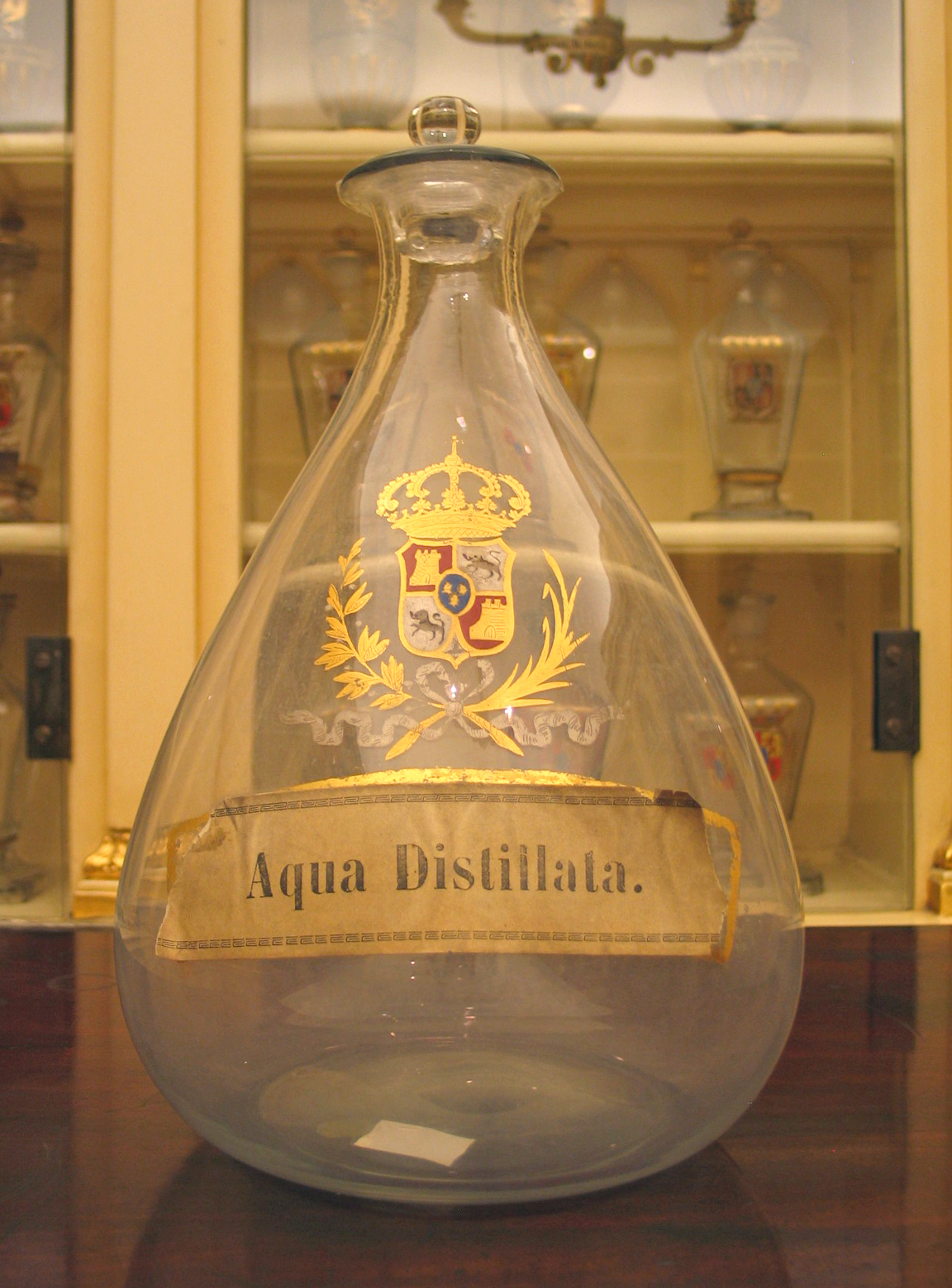
Bottle for distilled water in the Royal Academy of Pharmacy (Spain)

Purified water is water that has been mechanically filtered or processed to remove impurities and make it suitable for use. Distilled water was the most common form of purified water but water is more frequently purified by other processes including capacitive deionization, reverse osmosis, carbon filtering, microfiltration, ultrafiltration, ultraviolet oxidation, or electrodeionization. Combinations of a number of these processes have come into use to produce ultrapure water of such high purity that its trace contaminants are measured in parts per billion (ppb) or parts per trillion (ppt).

Purified water has many uses, largely in the production of medications, in science and engineering laboratories and industries, and is produced in a range of purities. It is also used in the commercial beverage industry as the primary ingredient of any given trademarked bottling formula, in order to maintain product consistency. It can be produced on-site for immediate use or purchased in containers. Purified water in colloquial English can also refer to water that has been treated ("rendered potable") to neutralize, but not necessarily remove contaminants considered harmful to humans or animals.

== Parameters of water purity ==
Purified water is usually produced by the purification of drinking water or ground water. The impurities that may need to be removed are:

- inorganic ions (typically monitored as electrical conductivity or resistivity or specific tests)
- organic compounds (typically monitored as TOC or by specific tests)
- bacteria (monitored by total viable counts or epifluorescence)
- endotoxins and nucleases (monitored by LAL or specific enzyme tests)
- particulates (typically controlled by filtration)
- gases (typically managed by degassing when required)

== Purification methods ==
=== Distillation ===
Distilled water is produced by a process of distillation. Distillation involves boiling the water and then condensing the vapor into a clean container, leaving solid contaminants behind. Distillation produces very pure water. A white or yellowish mineral scale is left in the distillation apparatus, which requires regular cleaning. Distilled water, like all purified water, must be stored in a sterilized container to guarantee the absence of bacteria. For many procedures, more economical alternatives are available, such as deionized water, and are used in place of distilled water.

=== Double distillation ===
Double-distilled water (abbreviated "ddH_{2}O", "Bidest. water" or "DDW") is prepared by slow boiling the uncontaminated condensed water vapor from a prior slow boiling. Historically, it was the de facto standard for highly purified laboratory water for biochemistry and used in laboratory trace analysis until combination purification methods of water purification became widespread.

=== Deionization ===
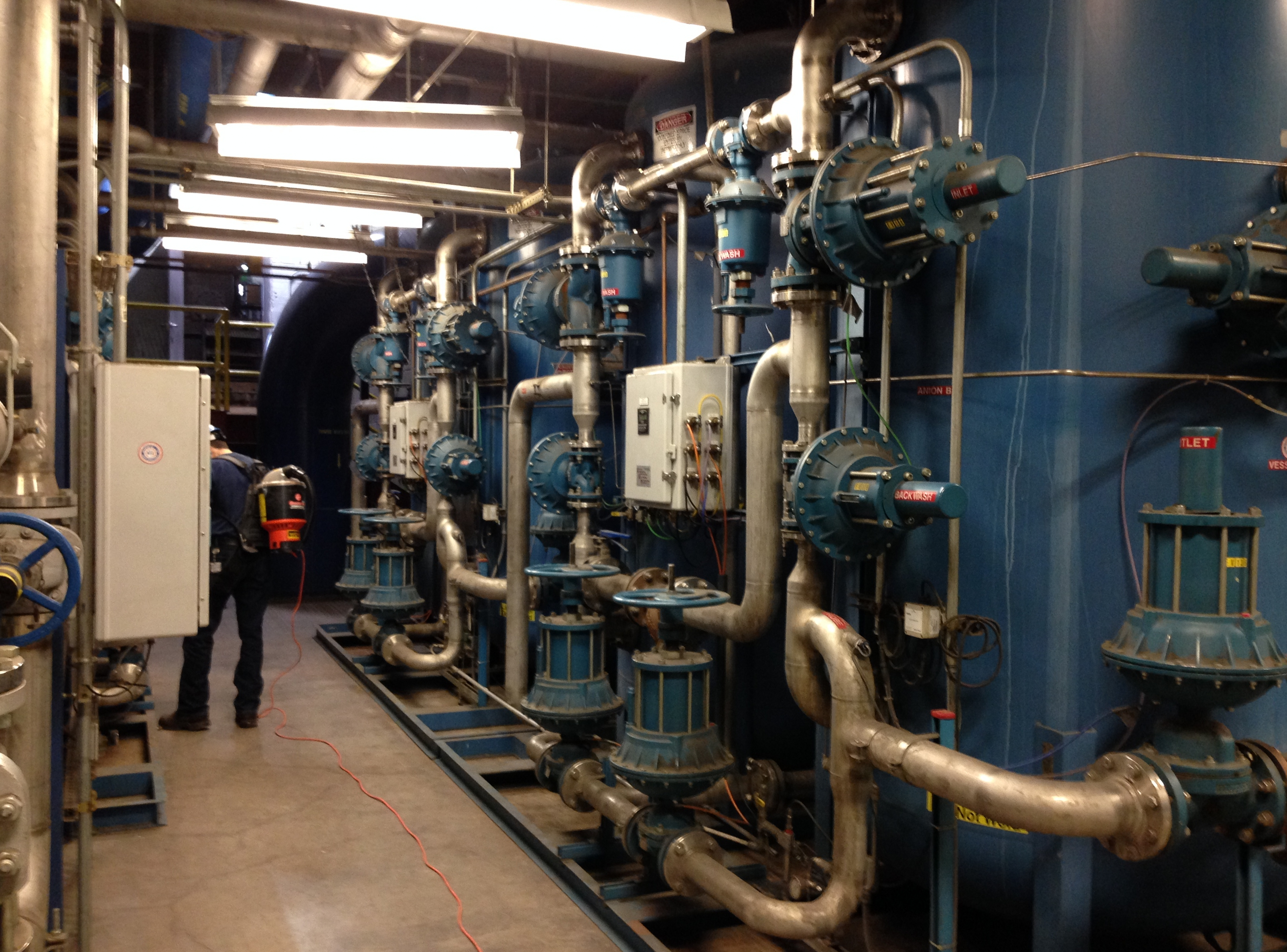
Large cation/anion ion exchangers used in demineralization of boiler feedwater.

Deionized water (DI water, DIW or de-ionized water), often synonymous with demineralized water/DM water, is water that has had almost all of its mineral ions removed, such as cations like sodium, calcium, iron, and copper, and anions such as chloride and sulfate. Deionization is a chemical process that uses specially manufactured ion-exchange resins, which exchange hydrogen and hydroxide ions for dissolved minerals, and then recombine to form water. Because most non-particulate water impurities are dissolved salts, deionization produces highly pure water that is generally similar to distilled water, with the advantage that the process is quicker and does not build up scale.

However, deionization does not significantly remove uncharged organic molecules, viruses, or bacteria, except by incidental trapping in the resin. Specially made strong base anion resins can remove Gram-negative bacteria. Deionization can be done continuously and inexpensively using electrodeionization.

Three types of deionization exist: co-current, counter-current, and mixed bed.

==== Co-current deionization ====
Co-current deionization refers to the original downflow process where both input water and regeneration chemicals enter at the top of an ion-exchange column and exit at the bottom. Co-current operating costs are comparatively higher than counter-current deionization because of the additional usage of regenerants. Because regenerant chemicals are dilute when they encounter the bottom or finishing resins in an ion-exchange column, the product quality is lower than a similarly sized counter-flow column.

The process is still used, and can be maximized with the fine-tuning of the flow of regenerants within the ion exchange column.

==== Counter-current deionization ====
Counter-current deionization comes in two forms, each requiring engineered internals:

1. Upflow columns where input water enters from the bottom and regenerants enter from the top of the ion exchange column.
2. Upflow regeneration where water enters from the top and regenerants enter from the bottom.

In both cases, separate distribution headers (input water, input regenerant, exit water, and exit regenerant) must be tuned to: the input water quality and flow, the time of operation between regenerations, and the desired product water analysis.

Counter-current deionization is the more attractive method of ion exchange. Chemicals (regenerants) flow in the opposite direction to the service flow. Less time for regeneration is required when compared to cocurrent columns. The quality of the finished product can be as low as .5 parts per million. The main advantage of counter-current deionization is the low operating cost, due to the low usage of regenerants during the regeneration process.

==== Mixed bed deionization ====
Mixed bed deionization is a 40/60 mixture of cation and anion resin combined in a single ion-exchange column. With proper pretreatment, product water purified from a single pass through a mixed bed ion exchange column is the purest that can be made. Most commonly, mixed bed demineralizers are used for final water polishing to clean the last few ions within water prior to use. Small mixed bed deionization units have no regeneration capability. Commercial mixed bed deionization units have elaborate internal water and regenerant distribution systems for regeneration. A control system operates pumps and valves for the regenerants of spent anions and cations resins within the ion exchange column. Each is regenerated separately, then remixed during the regeneration process. Because of the high quality of product water achieved, and because of the expense and difficulty of regeneration, mixed bed demineralizers are used only when the highest purity water is required.

=== Softening ===
Softening consists in preventing the possible precipitation of poorly soluble minerals from natural water due to changes occurring in the physico-chemical conditions (such as pCO_{2}, pH, and E_{h}). It is applied when poorly soluble ions present in water might precipitate as insoluble salts (e.g., CaCO_{3}, CaSO_{4}...), or interact with a chemical process. The water is "softened" by exchanging poorly soluble divalent cations (mainly Ca^{2+}, Mg^{2+} and Fe^{2+}) with the soluble Na^{+} cation. Softened water has therefore a higher electrical conductivity than deionized water. Softened water cannot be considered as truly demineralized water, but does no longer contain cations responsible for the hardness of water and causing the formation of limescale, a hard chalky deposit essentially consisting of CaCO_{3}, building up inside kettles, hot water boilers, and pipework.

=== Demineralization ===
In the strict sense, the term demineralization should imply removing all dissolved "mineral species" from water. Thus not only removing dissolved salt as obtained by simple deionization, but also neutral dissolved "Mineral species" such as dissolved iron hydroxides (Fe(OH)_{3}) or dissolved silica (Si(OH)_{4}), two solutes often present in water. In this way, demineralized water has the same electrical conductivity as deionized water, but is purer because it does not contain non-ionized substances, i.e. neutral solutes. However, demineralized water is often used interchangeably with deionized water and can be also confused with softened water, depending on the exact definition used: removing only the cations susceptible to precipitate as insoluble minerals (from there, "demineralization"), or removing all the "mineral species" present in water, and thus not only dissolved ions but also neutral solute species. So, the term demineralized water is vague and deionized water or softened water should often be preferred in its place for more clarity.

=== Other processes ===
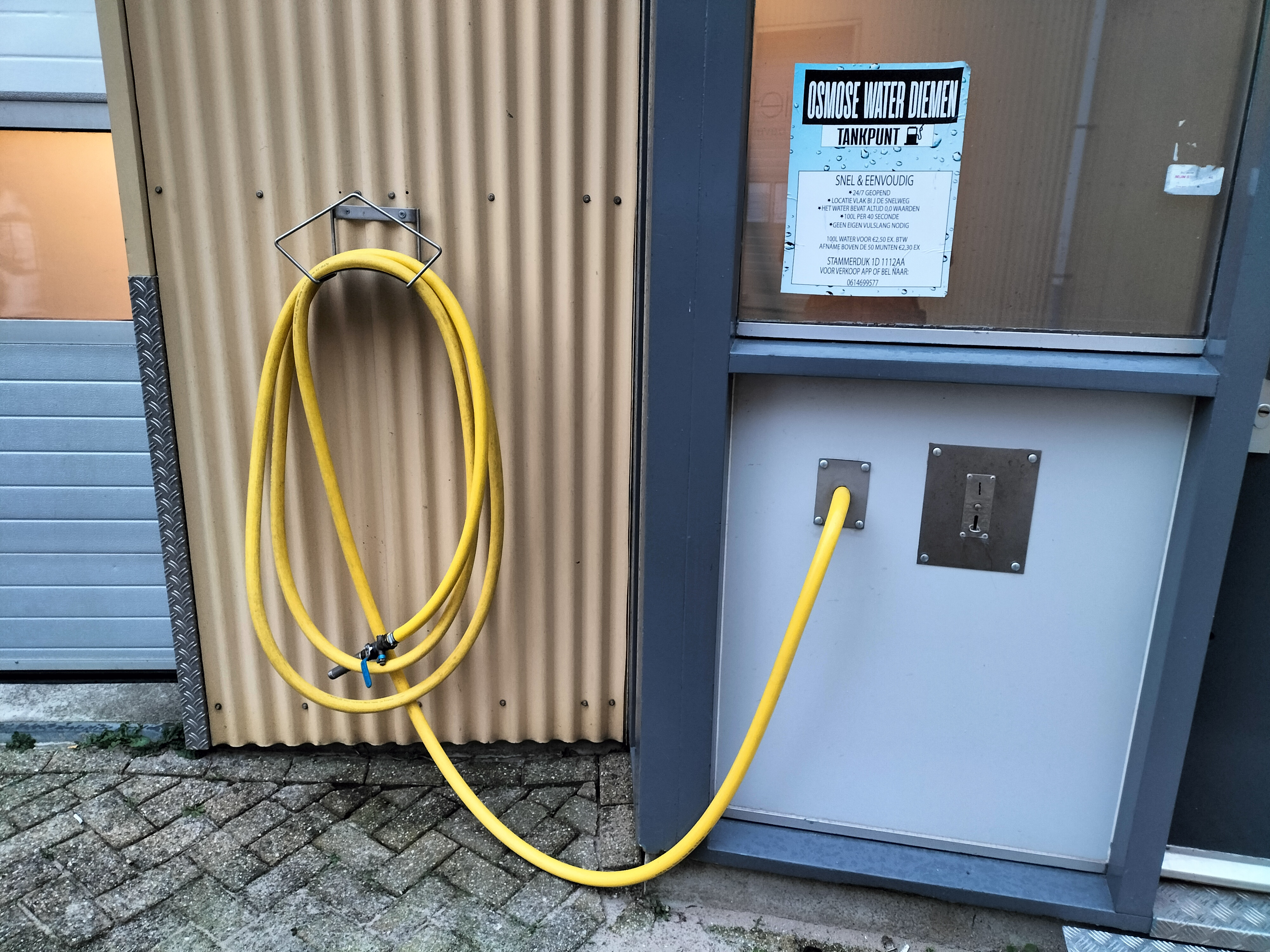
Distribution station for "Osmosis water" aimed at window cleaners

Other processes are also used to purify water, including reverse osmosis, carbon filtration, microporous filtration, ultrafiltration, ultraviolet oxidation, or electrodialysis. These are used in place of, or in addition to, the processes listed above. Processes rendering water potable but not necessarily closer to being pure H_{2}O / hydroxide + hydronium ions include the use of dilute sodium hypochlorite, ozone, mixed-oxidants (electro-catalyzed H_{2}O + NaCl), and iodine; See discussion regarding potable water treatments under "Health effects" below.

== Uses ==
Purified water is suitable for many applications, including autoclaves, hand-pieces, laboratory testing, laser cutting, and automotive use. Purification removes contaminants that may interfere with processes, or leave residues on evaporation. Although water is generally considered to be a good electrical conductor—for example, domestic electrical systems are considered particularly hazardous to people if they may be in contact with wet surfaces—pure water is a poor conductor. The conductivity of water is measured in Siemens per meter (S/m). Sea-water is typically 5 S/m, drinking water is typically in the range of 5-50 mS/m, while highly purified water can be as low as 5.5 μS/m (0.055 μS/cm), a ratio of about 1,000,000:1,000:1.

Purified water is used in the pharmaceutical industry. Water of this grade is widely used as a raw material, ingredient, and solvent in the processing, formulation, and manufacture of pharmaceutical products, active pharmaceutical ingredients (APIs) and intermediates, compendial articles, and analytical reagents. The microbiological content of the water is of importance and the water must be regularly monitored and tested to show that it remains within microbiological control.

Purified water is also used in the commercial beverage industry as the primary ingredient of any given trademarked bottling formula, in order to maintain critical consistency of taste, clarity, and color. This guarantees the consumer reliably safe and satisfying drinking. In the process prior to filling and sealing, individual bottles are always rinsed with deionised water to remove any particles that could cause a change in taste.

Deionised and distilled water are used in lead–acid batteries to prevent erosion of the cells, although deionised water is the better choice as more impurities are removed from the water in the creation process.

=== Laboratory use ===
Technical standards on water quality have been established by a number of professional organizations, including the American Chemical Society (ACS), ASTM International, the U.S. National Committee for Clinical Laboratory Standards (NCCLS) which is now CLSI, and the U.S. Pharmacopeia (USP). The ASTM, NCCLS, and ISO 3696 or the International Organization for Standardization classify purified water into Grade 1–3 or Types I–IV depending on the level of purity. These organizations have similar, although not identical, parameters for highly purified water.

Note that the European Pharmacopeia uses Highly Purified Water (HPW) as a definition for water meeting the quality of Water For Injection, without however having undergone distillation. In the laboratory context, highly purified water is used to denominate various qualities of water having been "highly" purified.

Regardless of which organization's water quality norm is used, even Type I water may require further purification depending on the specific laboratory application. For example, water that is being used for molecular-biology experiments needs to be DNase or RNase-free, which requires special additional treatment or functional testing. Water for microbiology experiments needs to be completely sterile, which is usually accomplished by autoclaving. Water used to analyze trace metals may require the elimination of trace metals to a standard beyond that of the Type I water norm.

Maximum contaminant levels in purified water
Contaminant	Parameter	ISO 3696 (1987)			ASTM (D1193-91)				NCCLS (1988)			Pharmacopoeia	
Contaminant	Parameter	Grade 1	Grade 2	Grade 3	Type I (Note: Requires use of 0.2 μm membrane filter)	Type II (Note: Prepared by distillation)	Type III (Note: Requires the use of 0.45 μm membrane filter)	Type IV	Type I	Type II	Type III	EP (20 °C)	USP
Ions	Resistivity at 25 °C [MΩ·cm]	10	1	0.2	18.2	1.0	4.0	0.2	>10	>1	>0.1	>0.23	>0.77
Ions	Conductivity at 25 °C [μS·cm^{−1}]	0.1	1.0	5.0	0.055	1.0	0.25	5.0	<0.1	<1	<10	<4.3	<1.3
Acidity/Alkalinity	pH at 25 °C	-	-	5.0–7.5	-	-	-	5.0–8.0	-	-	5.0–8.0	-	-
Organics	Total Organic Carbon/p.p.b.(μg/L)	-	-	-	10	50	200	-	<50	<200	<1000	<500	<500
Total Solids	mg/kg	-	1	2	-	-	-	-	0.1	1	5	-	-
Colloids	Silica [μg/mL]	-	-	-	<2	<3	<500	-	<0.05	<0.1	<1	-	-
Bacteria	CFU/mL	-	-	-	\ -	-	-	-	<10	<1000	-	<100	<100

==== Criticism ====
A member of the ASTM D19 (Water) Committee, Erich L. Gibbs, criticized ASTM Standard D1193, by saying "Type I water could be almost anything – water that meets some or all of the limits, part or all of the time, at the same or different points in the production process."

==== Electrical conductivity ====
Completely de-gassed ultrapure water has a conductivity of 1.2 × 10^{−4} S/m, whereas on equilibration to the atmosphere it is 7.5 × 10^{−5} S/m due to dissolved CO_{2} in it. The highest grades of ultrapure water should not be stored in glass or plastic containers because these container materials leach (release) contaminants at very low concentrations. Storage vessels made of silica are used for less-demanding applications and vessels of ultrapure tin are used for the highest-purity applications. Although electrical conductivity only indicates the presence of ions, the majority of common contaminants found naturally in water ionize to some degree. This ionization is a good measure of the efficacy of a filtration system, and more expensive systems incorporate conductivity-based alarms to indicate when filters should be refreshed or replaced. For comparison, seawater has a conductivity of perhaps 5 S/m (53 mS/cm is quoted), while normal un-purified tap water may have conductivity of 5 × 10^{−3} S/m (50 μS/cm) (to within an order of magnitude), which is still about 2 or 3 orders of magnitude higher than the output from a well-functioning demineralizing or distillation mechanism, so low levels of contamination or declining performance are easily detected.

=== Industrial uses ===
Some industrial processes, notably in the semiconductor and pharmaceutical industries, need large amounts of very pure water. In these situations, feedwater is first processed into purified water and then further processed to produce ultrapure water.

Another class of ultrapure water used for pharmaceutical industries is called Water-For-Inject (WFI), typically generated by multiple distillation or compressed-vaporation process of DI water or RO-DI water. It has a tighter bacteria requirement as 10 CFU per 100 mL, instead of the 100 CFU per mL per USP.

=== Other uses ===
Distilled or deionized water is commonly used to top up the lead–acid batteries used in cars and trucks and for other applications. The presence of foreign ions commonly found in tap water will drastically shorten the lifespan of a lead–acid battery.

Distilled or deionized water is preferable to tap water for use in automotive cooling systems.

Using deionized or distilled water in appliances that evaporate water, such as steam irons and humidifiers, can reduce the build-up of mineral scale, which shortens appliance life. Some appliance manufacturers say that deionised water is no longer necessary.

Purified water is used in freshwater and marine aquariums. Since it does not contain impurities such as copper and chlorine, it helps to keep fish free from diseases and avoids the build-up of algae on aquarium plants due to its lack of phosphate and silicate. Deionized water should be re-mineralized before use in aquaria since it lacks many macro- and micro-nutrients needed by plants and fish.

Water (sometimes mixed with methanol) has been used to extend the performance of aircraft engines. In piston engines, it acts to delay the onset of engine knocking. In turbine engines, it allows more fuel flow for a given turbine temperature limit and increases mass flow. As an example, it was used on early Boeing 707 models. Advanced materials and engineering have since rendered such systems obsolete for new designs; however, spray-cooling of incoming air-charge is still used to a limited extent with off-road turbo-charged engines (road-race track cars).

Deionized water is very often used as an ingredient in many cosmetics and pharmaceuticals. "Aqua" is the standard name for water in the International Nomenclature of Cosmetic Ingredients standard, which is mandatory on product labels in some countries.

Because of its high relative dielectric constant (~80), deionized water is also used (for short durations, when the resistive losses are acceptable) as a high voltage dielectric in many pulsed power applications, such as the Sandia National Laboratories Z Machine.

Distilled water can be used in PC water-cooling systems and Laser Marking Systems. The lack of impurity in the water means that the system stays clean and prevents a buildup of bacteria and algae. Also, the low conductance reduces the risk of electrical damage in the event of a leak. However, deionized water has been known to cause cracks in brass and copper fittings.

When used as a rinse after washing cars, windows, and similar applications, purified water dries without leaving spots caused by dissolved solutes.

Deionized water is used in water-fog fire-extinguishing systems used in sensitive environments, such as where high-voltage electrical and sensitive electronic equipment is used. The 'sprinkler' nozzles use much finer spray jets than other systems and operate at up 35 MPa (350 bar; 5,000 psi) of pressure. The extremely fine mist produced takes the heat out of fire rapidly, and the fine droplets of water are nonconducting (when deionized) and are less likely to damage sensitive equipment. Deionized water, however, is inherently acidic, and contaminants (such as copper, dust, stainless and carbon steel, and many other common materials) rapidly supply ions, thus re-ionizing the water. It is not generally considered acceptable to spray water on electrical circuits that are powered, and it is generally considered undesirable to use water in electrical contexts.

Distilled or purified water is used in humidors to prevent cigars from collecting bacteria, mold, and contaminants, as well as to prevent residue from forming on the humidifier material.

Window cleaners using water-fed pole systems also use purified water because it enables the windows to dry by themselves leaving no stains or smears. The use of purified water from water-fed poles also prevents the need for using ladders and therefore ensure compliance with Work at Height Legislation in the UK.

== Mineral consumption ==
Distillation removes all minerals from water, and the membrane methods of reverse osmosis and nanofiltration remove most, or virtually all, minerals. This results in demineralized water, which has not been proven to be healthier than drinking water. The World Health Organization investigated the health effects of demineralized water in 1980, and found that demineralized water increased diuresis and the elimination of electrolytes, with decreased serum potassium concentration. Magnesium, calcium and other nutrients in water may help to protect against nutritional deficiency. Recommendations for magnesium have been put at a minimum of 10 mg/L with 20–30 mg/L optimum; for calcium a 20 mg/L minimum and a 40–80 mg/L optimum, and a total water hardness (adding magnesium and calcium) of 2–4 mmol/L. For fluoride, the concentration recommended for dental health is 0.5–1.0 mg/L, with a maximum guideline value of 1.5 mg/L to avoid dental fluorosis.

Municipal water supplies often add or have trace impurities at levels that are regulated to be safe for consumption. Much of these additional impurities, such as volatile organic compounds, fluoride, and an estimated 75,000+ other chemical compounds are not removed through conventional filtration; however, distillation and reverse osmosis eliminate nearly all of these impurities.

- Artificial seawater
- Atmospheric water generator
- Electrodeionization
- Heavy water
- Hydrogen production
- Milli-Q water
- Ultrapure water
- Water for injection
- Water ionizer
- Water softening
- Water purification
