= Total organic carbon =

Concentration of organic carbon in a sample

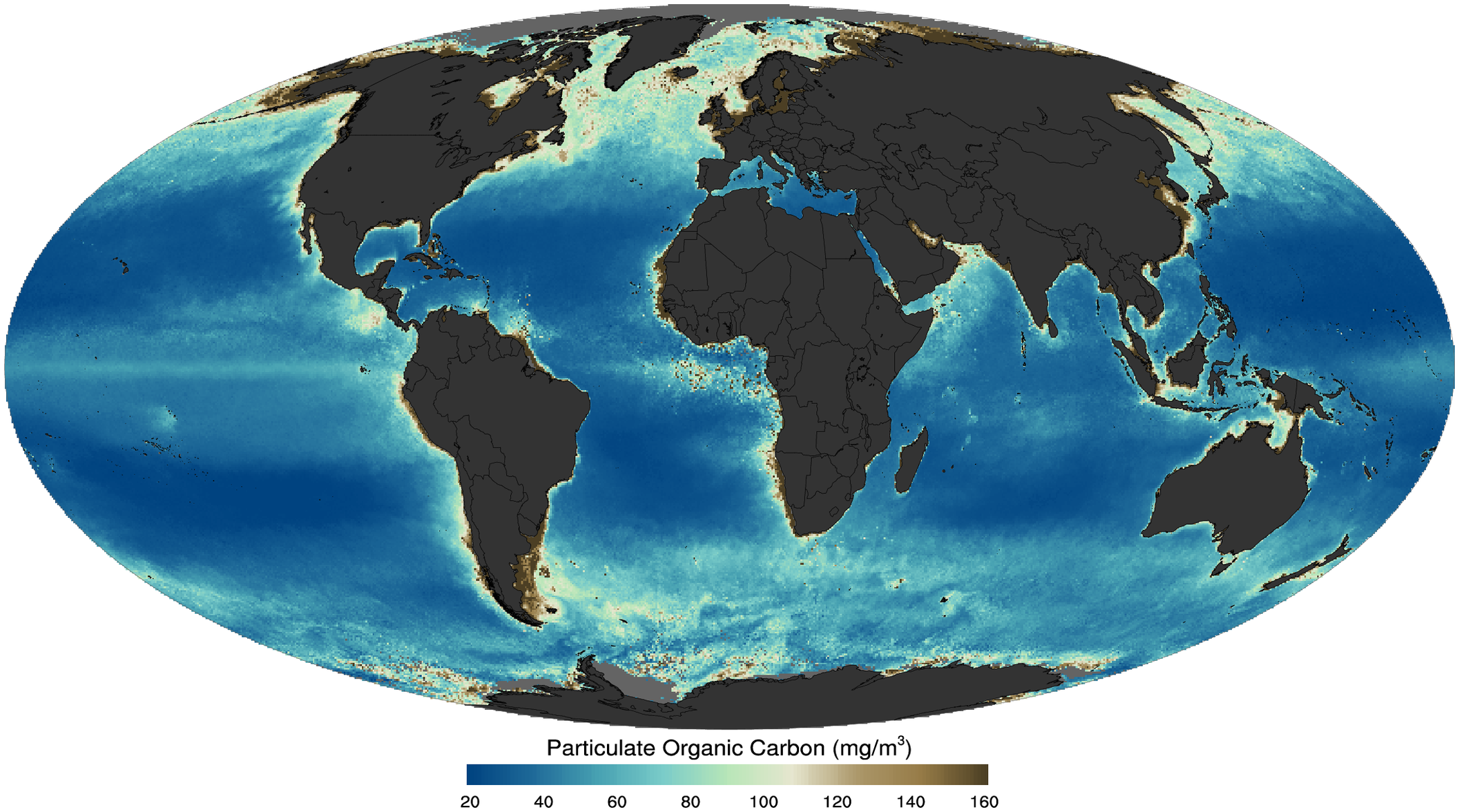
2011 Ocean particulate organic carbon derived from the MODIS-aqua

Total organic carbon (TOC) is an analytical parameter representing the concentration of organic carbon in a sample. TOC determinations are made in a variety of application areas. For example, TOC may be used as a non-specific indicator of water quality, or TOC of source rock may be used as one factor in evaluating a petroleum play. For marine surface sediments average TOC content is 0.5% in the deep ocean, and 2% along the eastern margins.

A typical analysis for total carbon (TC) measures both the total organic carbon (TOC) present and the complementing total inorganic carbon (TIC), the latter representing the amount of non-organic carbon, like carbon in carbonate minerals. Subtracting the inorganic carbon from the total carbon yields TOC. Another common variant of TOC analysis involves removing the TIC portion first and then measuring the leftover carbon. This method involves purging an acidified sample with carbon-free air or nitrogen prior to measurement, and so is more accurately called non-purgeable organic carbon (NPOC).

== Measurement ==
Relationship of carbon-content categories

Since all TOC analyzers only actually measure total carbon, TOC analysis always requires some accounting for the inorganic carbon that is always present. One analysis technique involves a two-stage process commonly referred to as TOC differential method. It measures the amount of inorganic carbon (IC) evolved from an acidified aliquot of a sample and also the amount of total carbon (TC) present in the sample. TOC is calculated by subtraction of the IC value from the TC of the sample. Another method directly measures TOC in the sample by acidifying the sample to a pH value of two or less to release the CO_{2} gas by decomposition of the carbonates and vent these gases to the air by a purge step. The remaining non-purgeable organic carbon (NPOC) contained in the liquid aliquot is then oxidized releasing the CO_{2} gases. These gases are then sent to the detector for measurement. This method is also referred to as the direct TOC method. A further variant employs acidification of the sample to evolve carbon dioxide and measuring it as inorganic carbon (IC), then oxidizing and measuring the remaining non-purgeable organic carbon (NPOC). This is called TIC-NPOC analysis. TC oxidizes in a combustion chamber at 1000 degrees Celsius; if no supporting catalyst is used to allow full combustion at temperatures lower than 1000 degrees C; while the combustion chamber for IC heats only to 150 degrees Celsius. The reason for this is because inorganic is decomposed at lower temperatures than organic carbons.

Whether the analysis of TOC is by TC-IC or NPOC methods, it may be broken into three main stages:

1. Acidification
2. Oxidation
3. Detection and Quantification

=== Acidification ===
Addition of acid and inert-gas sparging allows all bicarbonate and carbonate ions to be converted to carbon dioxide, and this IC product vented along with any purgeable organic carbon (POC) that was present.

=== Oxidation ===
The second stage is the oxidation of the carbon in the remaining sample in the form of carbon dioxide (CO_{2}) and other gases. Modern TOC analyzers perform this oxidation step by several processes:

- High temperature combustion
- High temperature catalytic oxidation (HTCO)
- Photo-oxidation alone
- Thermo-chemical oxidation
- Photo-chemical oxidation
- Electrolytic oxidation

==== High temperature combustion ====
Prepared samples are combusted from 1000 up to 1200 degrees C in an oxygen-rich atmosphere. All carbon present converts to carbon dioxide, flows through scrubber tubes to remove interferences such as chlorine gas, and water vapor, and the carbon dioxide is measured either by absorption into a strong base then weighed, or using an infrared detector. Most modern analyzers use non-dispersive infrared (NDIR) for detection of the carbon dioxide. Compared to the conventional high temperature catalytic oxidation, the great benefit of the combustion-method is the high oxidation power, so that oxidation-promoting catalysts are superfluous.

==== High temperature catalytic oxidation ====
An HTCO combustion tube packed with platinum catalyst

A manual or automated process injects the sample onto a catalyst in a combustion tube operated from 680 up to 950 degrees C in an oxygen rich atmosphere. The concentration of carbon dioxide generated is measured with a non-dispersive infrared (NDIR) detector.

Oxidation of the sample is complete after injection into the furnace, turning oxidizable material in the sample into gaseous form. A carbon-free carrier gas transports the CO_{2}, through a moisture trap and halide scrubbers to remove water vapor and halides from the gas stream before it reaches the detector. These substances can interfere with the detection of the CO_{2} gas. The HTCO method may be useful in those applications where difficult to oxidize compounds, or high molecular weight organics, are present as it provides almost complete oxidation of organics including solids and particulates small enough to be injected into the furnace. The major drawback of HTCO analysis is its unstable baseline resulting from the gradual accumulation of non-volatile residues within the combustion tube. These residues continuously change TOC background levels requiring continuous background correction. Because aqueous samples are injected directly into a very hot, usually quartz, furnace only small aliquots (less than 2 milliliters and usually less than 50 - 100 microliter, with a maximum of approximately 300 - 400 micro-liters under special conditions; such as repetitive injections) of sample can be handled making the methods less sensitive than chemical oxidation methods capable of digesting as much as 10 times more sample. Also, the salt content of the samples do not combust, and so therefore, gradually build a residue inside the combustion tube eventually clogging the catalyst resulting in poor peak shapes, and degraded accuracy or precision, unless appropriate maintenance procedures are followed. The catalyst should be regenerated or replaced as needed. To avoid this problem the manufacturing industry has developed several concepts, such as matrix separation, ceramic reactors, better process control or methods without catalysts.

==== Photo-oxidation (ultraviolet light) ====
In this oxidation scheme, ultraviolet light alone oxidizes the carbon within the sample to produce CO_{2}. The UV oxidation method offers the most reliable, low maintenance method of analyzing TOC in ultra-pure waters.

==== Ultraviolet/persulfate oxidation ====
Like the photo-oxidation method, UV light is the oxidizer but the oxidation power of the reaction is magnified by the addition of a chemical oxidizer, which is usually a persulfate compound. The mechanisms of the reactions are as follows:

Free radical oxidants formed:

$\mathrm S_2\mathrm O_8^{2-}\underset{hv}{\longrightarrow}2 \ \mathrm{SO}_4^{-\bullet}$

$\mathrm H_2\mathrm O\underset{hv}{\longrightarrow}\mathrm H^++\mathrm{OH}^\bullet$

$\mathrm{SO}_4^{-\bullet}+\mathrm H_2\mathrm O\longrightarrow \mathrm{SO}_4^{2-}+\mathrm{OH}^\bullet+\mathrm H^+$

Excitation of organics:

$\mathrm R\underset{hv}{\longrightarrow}\mathrm R^*$

Oxidation of organics:

$\mathrm R^*+\mathrm{SO}_4^{-\bullet}+\mathrm{OH}^\bullet\longrightarrow n\mathrm{CO}_2+\dots$

The UV–chemical oxidation method offers a relatively low maintenance, high sensitivity method for a wide range of applications. However, there are oxidation limitations of this method. Limitations include the inaccuracies associated with the addition of any foreign substance into the analyte and samples with high amounts of particulates. Performing "system blank" analysis, which is to analyze then subtract the amount of carbon contributed by the chemical additive, inaccuracies are lowered. However, analyses of levels below 200 ppb TOC are still difficult.

==== Thermochemical persulfate oxidation ====
Also known as heated persulfate, the method utilizes the same free radical formation as UV persulfate oxidation except uses heat to magnify the oxidizing power of persulfate. Chemical oxidation of carbon with a strong oxidizer, such as persulfate, is highly efficient, and unlike UV, is not susceptible to lower recoveries caused by turbidity in samples. The analysis of system blanks, necessary in all chemical procedures, is especially necessary with heated persulfate TOC methods because the method is so sensitive that reagents cannot be prepared with carbon contents low enough to not be detected. Persulfate methods are used in the analysis of wastewater, drinking water, and pharmaceutical waters. When used in conjunction with sensitive NDIR detectors heated persulfate TOC instruments readily measure TOC at single digit parts per billion (ppb) up to hundreds of parts per million (ppm) depending on sample volumes.

=== Detection and quantification ===
Accurate detection and quantification are the most vital components of the TOC analysis process. Conductivity and non-dispersive infrared (NDIR) are the two common detection methods used in modern TOC analyzers.

==== Conductivity ====
There are two types of conductivity detectors, direct and membrane. Direct conductivity provides an all-encompassing approach of measuring CO_{2}. This detection method uses no carrier gas, is good at the parts per billion (ppb) ranges, but has a very limited analytical range. Membrane conductivity relies upon the filtering of the CO_{2} prior to measuring it with a conductivity cell. Both methods analyze sample conductivity before and after oxidization, attributing this differential measurement to the TOC of the sample. During the sample oxidization phase, CO_{2} (directly related to the TOC in the sample) and other gases are formed. The dissolved CO_{2} forms a weak acid, thereby changing the conductivity of the original sample proportionately to the TOC in the sample. Conductivity analyses assume that only CO_{2} is present within the solution. As long as this holds true, then the TOC calculation by this differential measurement is valid. However, depending on the chemical species present in the sample and their individual products of oxidation, they may present either a positive or a negative interference to the actual TOC value, resulting in analytical error. Some of the interfering chemical species include Cl^{−}, HCO_{3}^{−}, SO_{3}^{2−}, SO_{2}^{−}, ClO_{2}^{−}, and H^{+}. Small changes in pH and temperature fluctuations also contribute to inaccuracy. Membrane conductivity analyzers have improved upon the direct conductivity approach by incorporating the use of hydrophobic gas permeation membranes to allow a more “selective” passage of the dissolved CO_{2} gas and nothing else. This provides a more precise and accurate measurement of the organics that were converted to CO_{2}.

==== Non-dispersive infrared (NDIR) ====
The non-dispersive infrared analysis (NDIR) method offers the only practical interference-free method for detecting CO_{2} in TOC analysis. The principal advantage of using NDIR is that it directly and specifically measures the CO_{2} generated by oxidation of the organic carbon in the oxidation reactor, rather than relying on a measurement of a secondary, corrected effect, such as used in conductivity measurements.

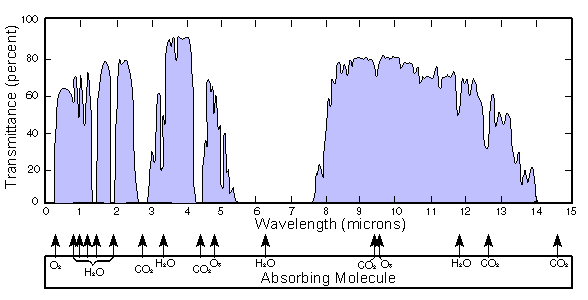
Plot of atmospheric transmittance in part of IR region showing CO_{2} absorbing wavelengths

A traditional NDIR detector relies upon flow-through-cell technology, where the oxidation product flows into and out of the detector continuously. A region of absorption of infrared light specific to CO_{2}, usually around 4.26 μm (2350 cm^{−1}), is measured over time as the gas flows through the detector. A second reference measurement that is non-specific to CO_{2} is also taken and the differential result correlates to the CO_{2} concentration in the detector at that moment. As the gas continues to flow into and out of the detector cell the sum of the measurements results in a peak that is integrated and correlated to the total CO_{2} concentration in the sample aliquot.

A new advance of NDIR technology is static pressurized concentration (SPC). The exit valve of the NDIR is closed to allow the detector to become pressurized. Once the gases in the detector have reached equilibrium, the concentration of the CO_{2} is analyzed. This pressurization of the sample gas stream in the NDIR, a patented technique, allows for increased sensitivity and precision by measuring the entirety of the oxidation products of the sample in one reading, compared to flow-through cell technology. The output signal is proportional to the concentration of CO_{2} in the carrier gas, from the oxidation of the sample aliquot. UV/ Persulfate oxidation combined with NDIR detection provides good oxidation of organics, low instrument maintenance, good precision at ppb levels, relatively fast sample analysis time and easily accommodates multiple applications, including purified water (PW), water for injection (WFI), CIP, drinking water and ultra-pure water analyses.

== Analysers ==
Virtually all TOC analysers measure the CO_{2} formed when organic carbon is oxidized and/or when inorganic carbon is acidified. Oxidation is performed either through Pt-catalyzed combustion, by heated persulfate, or with a UV/persulfate reactor. Once the CO_{2} is formed, it is measured by a detector: either a conductivity cell (if the CO_{2} is aqueous) or a non-dispersive infrared cell (after purging the aqueous CO_{2} into the gaseous phase). Conductivity detection is only desirable in the lower TOC ranges in deionized waters, whereas NDIR detection excels in all TOC ranges. A variation described as "membrane conductometric detection can allow for measurement of TOC across a wide analytical range in both deionized and non-deionized water samples. Modern high-performance TOC instruments are capable of detecting carbon concentrations well below 1 μg/L (1 part per billion or ppb).

A total organic carbon analyser determines the amount of carbon in a water sample. By acidifying the sample and flushing with nitrogen or helium the sample removes inorganic carbon, leaving only organic carbon sources for measurement. There are two types of analysers. One uses combustion and the other chemical oxidation. This is used as a water purity test, as the presence of bacteria introduces organic carbon.

=== Analyser field testing and reports ===
A non-profit research and testing organization, the Instrumentation Testing Association (ITA) can provide results of field testing online TOC analysers in an industrial wastewater application. Gulf Coast Waste Disposal Authority (GCWDA), Bayport Industrial Wastewater Treatment Plant in Pasadena, Texas sponsored and conducted this test in 2011. The GCWDA Bayport facility treats approximately 30 mgd of industrial waste received from approximately 65 customers (primarily petrochemical). Field tests consisted of operating online TOC analysers at the influent of the Bayport facility in which TOC concentrations can range from 490 to 1020 mg/L with an average of 870 mg/L. GCWDA conducts approximately 102 TOC analyses in their laboratory per day at their Bayport treatment facility and use TOC measurements for process control and billing purposes. GCWDA plans to use online TOC analysers for process control, detecting influent slug loads from industries and to potentially use online TOC analysers to detect and monitor volatiles of the incoming stream. Field tests were conducted for a period of 90-days and used laboratory conformance measurements once per day to compare with analyser output to demonstrate the instrument's overall accuracy when subjected to many simultaneously changing parameters as experienced in real-time monitoring conditions. Field test results can provide information regarding instrument design, operation and maintenance requirements which influence the performance of the instruments in field applications. The field test report includes evaluations of online TOC analysers utilizing the following technologies: High temperature combustion (HTC), high temperature catalytic/combustion oxidation (HTCO), supercritical water oxidation (SCWO), and two-stage advanced oxidation (TSAO).

=== Combustion ===
In a combustion analyser, half of the sample is injected into a chamber where it is acidified, usually with phosphoric acid, to turn all of the inorganic carbon into carbon dioxide as per the following reaction:

CO_{2} + H_{2}O ⇌ H_{2}CO_{3} ⇌H^{+} + HCO_{3}^{−} ⇌ 2H^{+} + CO_{3}^{2−}

This is then sent to a detector for measurement. The other half of the sample is injected into a combustion chamber which is raised to between 600–700 °C, some even up to 1200 °C. Here, all the carbon reacts with oxygen, forming carbon dioxide. It is then flushed into a cooling chamber, and finally into the detector. Usually, the detector used is a non-dispersive infrared spectrophotometer. By finding the total inorganic carbon and subtracting it from the total carbon content, the amount of organic carbon is determined.

=== Chemical oxidation ===
Chemical oxidation analysers inject the sample into a chamber with phosphoric acid followed by persulfate. The analysis is separated into two steps. One removes inorganic carbon by acidification and purging. After removal of inorganic carbon persulfate is added and the sample is either heated or bombarded with UV light from a mercury vapor lamp. Free radicals form persulfate and react with any carbon available to form carbon dioxide. The carbon from both determination (steps) is either run through membranes which measure the conductivity changes that result from the presence of varying amounts of carbon dioxide, or purged into and detected by a sensitive NDIR detector. Same as the combustion analyser, the total carbon formed minus the inorganic carbon gives a good estimate of the total organic carbon in the sample. This method is often used in online applications because of its low maintenance requirements.

== Applications ==
TOC is the first chemical analysis to be carried out on potential petroleum source rock in oil exploration. It is very important in detecting contaminants in drinking water, cooling water, water used in semiconductor manufacturing, and water for pharmaceutical use. Analysis may be made either as an online continuous measurement or a lab-based measurement.

TOC detection is an important measurement because of the effects it may have on the environment, human health, and manufacturing processes. TOC is a highly sensitive, non-specific measurement of all organics present in a sample. It, therefore, can be used to regulate the organic chemical discharge to the environment in a manufacturing plant. In addition, low TOC can confirm the absence of potentially harmful organic chemicals in water used to manufacture pharmaceutical products. TOC is also of interest in the field of potable water purification due to byproducts of disinfection. Inorganic carbon poses little to no threat.

== Analysis ==
=== Environmental ===
Since the early 1970s, TOC has been an analytic technique used to measure water quality during the drinking water purification process. TOC in source waters comes from decaying natural organic matter (NOM) as well as synthetic sources. Humic acid, fulvic acid, amines, and urea are examples of NOM. Some detergents, pesticides, fertilizers, herbicides, industrial chemicals, and chlorinated organics are examples of synthetic sources. Before source water is treated for disinfection, TOC provides an estimate of the amount of NOM in the water source. In water treatment facilities, source water is subject to reaction with chlorine-containing disinfectants. When the raw water is chlorinated, active chlorine compounds (Cl_{2}, HOCl, ClO^{−}) react with NOM to produce chlorinated disinfection byproducts (DBPs). Researchers have determined that higher levels of NOM in source water during the disinfection process will increase the amount of carcinogens in the processed drinking water.

With passage of the U.S. Safe Drinking Water Act in 2001, TOC analysis emerged as a quick and accurate alternative to the classical but more lengthy biological oxygen demand (BOD) and chemical oxygen demand (COD) tests traditionally reserved for assessing the pollution potential of wastewaters. Today, environmental agencies regulate the trace limits of DBPs in drinking water. Recently published analytical methods, such as United States Environmental Protection Agency (EPA) method 415.3, support the Agency's Disinfectants and Disinfection Byproducts Rules, which regulate the amount of NOM to prevent the formation of DBPs in finished waters.

The content of TOC is also an important parameter to evaluate the quality of organic shale resources which are one of the most important unconventional fuels. Numerous evaluation methods have been introduced, including these based on wireline logs and in situ techniques.

=== Pharmaceutical ===
Introduction of organic matter into water systems occurs not only from living organisms and from decaying matter in source water, but also from purification and distribution system materials. A relationship may exist between endotoxins, microbial growth, and the development of biofilms on pipeline walls and biofilm growth within pharmaceutical water distribution systems. A correlation is believed to exist between TOC concentrations and the levels of endotoxins and microbes. Sustaining low TOC levels helps to control levels of endotoxins and microbes and thereby the development of biofilms. The United States Pharmacopoeia (USP), European Pharmacopoeia (EP) and Japanese Pharmacopoeia (JP) recognize TOC as a required test for purified water and water for injection (WFI). For this reason, TOC has found acceptance as a process control attribute in the biotechnology industry to monitor the performance of unit operations comprising water purification and distribution systems. As many of these biotechnology operations include the preparation of medicines, the U.S. Food and Drug Administration (FDA) enacts numerous regulations to protect the health of the public and ensure the product quality is maintained. To make sure there is no cross-contamination between product runs of different drugs, various cleaning procedures are performed. TOC concentration levels are used to track the success of these cleaning validation procedures.

=== Microelectronics ===
Organic contamination comes from multiple sources throughout the semiconductor manufacturing process. Organic residues left on the device can impact the wafer quality and yield. The organics can also be a food source for bacteria in the ultrapure water system. Due to the quality requirements of semiconductor water, TOC must be monitored at the parts per billion level. Continuous, online TOC analyzers play an essential role in the monitoring of water systems to help provide a reliable indication of system health.

== See also ==
- Dissolved organic carbon
- Particulate organic carbon
