= Ultrapure water =

Water purified to uncommonly stringent specifications

Ultrapure water (UPW), high-purity water or highly purified water (HPW) is water that has been purified to stringent specifications. Ultrapure water is a term commonly used in manufacturing to emphasize the fact that the water is treated to the highest levels of purity for all contaminant types, including organic and inorganic compounds, dissolved and particulate matter, and dissolved gases, as well as volatile and non-volatile compounds, reactive and inert compounds, and hydrophilic and hydrophobic compounds. In contrast to deionized (DI) water, UPW has organic particles and dissolved gases removed in addition to ions.

Ultrapure water is typically prepared in three broadly-defined stages: pretreatment, primary treatment, and polishing/transport. While various industries use the term "ultrapure water", the exact definitions differ among industries. Standards for ultrapure water are defined by various groups for the power industry, semiconductor industry, and pharmaceutical industry. Water purity requirements of the semiconductor industry are generally the most stringent to prevent circuit faults at the nanometer scale.

== Ultrapure water standards ==
A number of organizations and groups develop and publish standards associated with the production of UPW. For microelectronics and power, they include Semiconductor Equipment and Materials International (SEMI) (microelectronics and photovoltaic), American Society for Testing and Materials International (ASTM International) (semiconductor, power), Electric Power Research Institute (EPRI) (power), American Society of Mechanical Engineers (ASME) (power), and International Association for the Properties of Water and Steam (IAPWS) (power). Pharmaceutical plants follow water quality standards as developed by pharmacopeias, of which three examples are the United States Pharmacopeia, European Pharmacopeia, and Japanese Pharmacopeia.

== Purification process ==
Water is typically sourced from city feed water or other local supplies and is taken through a series of purification steps that results in UPW. Some systems recycle used UPW water back into their UPW filtration system as this water is often cleaner than original sources. The purification steps have been broadly categorized into pretreatment, primary treatment, polishing, and/or distribution. These are not strict categories, and certain purification techniques may be present in one or more of the broader steps depending on specific engineering needs or author classification.

=== Pretreatment ===
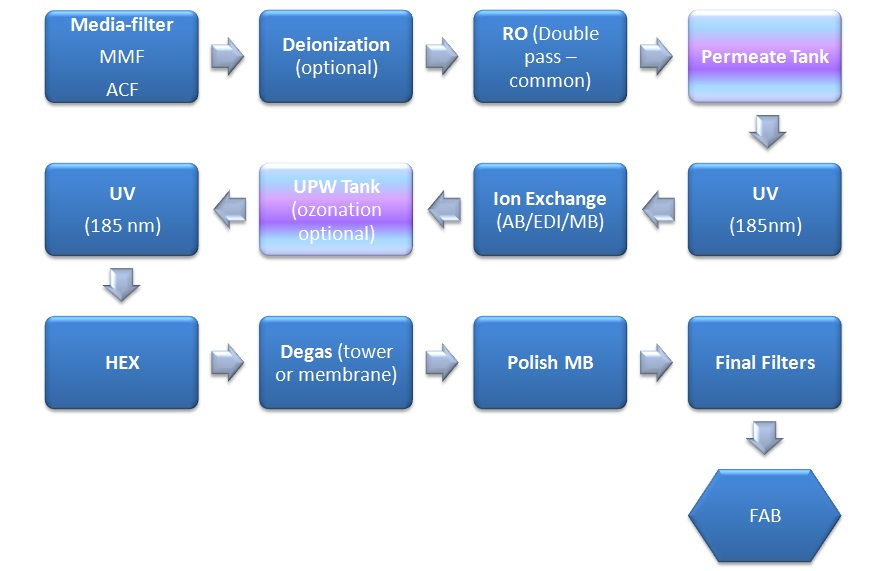
Typical ultrapure water purification configuration in a semiconductor plant

Pretreatment produces "purified water" and focuses on removing contaminants with inexpensive methods prior to reverse osmosis or ion exchange during primary treatment. Coagulation (flocculation) and settling are used along with filtration to remove particulate matter that could clog reverse osmosis filters or ion exchange resin beds. Water softening by precipitation may be used for water sources with a relatively high concentrations of dissolved salts to prevent scaling during subsequent steps. The use of coagulation, flocculation, and settling are common in municipal water treatment systems meaning pretreatment may not be necessary depending on locale. For electronics (semiconductor) applications, aluminium salts along with lime-based water softeners are used to remove silica during pre-treatment. Transition metal ions like iron and manganese can be removed through oxidation followed by precipitation/flocculation methods.

After bulk chemical treatments, pretreatment may include microfiltration or ultrafiltration to remove solids. Ion-exchange resins are commonly used in the pretreament step to further reduce the amount of scale-forming ions like calcium prior to reverse osmosis treatment as scaling can easily clog reverse osmosis membranes.

=== Primary treatment ===
Primary treatment aims to remove ions, dissolved gasses, and organic contaminants from pre-treated water. In the 21st century, multiple-pass reverse osmosis is often the primary method used during this step to remove dissolved ions and dissolved organic solids. As a membrane-filtration method it also removes suspended solids as well. Reverse osmosis is often used in this step to remove both dissolved ions and dissolved organic material.

Dissolved gases, including oxygen and volatile organic compounds, are removed during primary treatment by vacuum degassing or membrane degassing. Vacuum degassing towers were more common historically, but newer systems have trended towards used of membrane degasification.

Ultraviolet (UV) light can used to sterilize purified water during primary treatment though UV treatment can also be left until the polishing stage.

=== Polishing ===
Polishing is used in UPW systems to further reduce the already low-level of contaminants present after primary treatment. UV light is often used at this step to sterilize water. Further deionization is conducted using ion exchange beds or electrodeionization. Both inorganic ions (including silicate) and organic ions are removed through these processes. Ion-exchange beds used in the final polishing steps may be non-regenerable in contrast to those used in earlier steps. Ultrafiltration membranes with pore sizes of 0.45 μm are used to remove small particles including bacteria killed by UV sterilization.

In semiconductor applications, additional filters with pore sizes ≤200 nm are typically used just before distribution to further reduce particle contamination. Particles must be filtered down to a "critical particle size" that is one-half of the smallest feature size on a semiconductor chip. For example, chips containing a 40 nm features should have all particles >20 nm (0.02 μm) removed to avoid contamination that prevents computer chips from functioning.

After polishing, UPW is typically cycled continuously through the polishing system to prevent stagnation that can lead to bacterial growth.

== Contamination sources and removal ==
Bacteria, particles, organic carbon, ions, and dissolved gases are all present in typical municipal water systems and must be removed to create ultrapure water.

=== Particles and bacteria ===
Particles in UPW can cause defects in semiconductors, especially in photolithographic processes that define nanometer-sized features. Particulates can interfere with etching processes and bridge nanometer-scale features in final circuits causing electrical failures. Particles can be controlled by filtration for larger particles and ultrafiltration for nanometer scale particles. Particle sources can include bacterial fragments or particles from the walls of the fluid handling system.

Bacteria have been referred to as one of the most obstinate on this list to control as certain bacteria can still grow, even in low-nutrient environments. Bacteria can be controlled by sanitization or ultrafiltration (found in some pharmaceutical, but mostly semiconductor industries). Chemical sanitization can be performed using ozone or hydrogen peroxide.

=== Anions and cations ===
Cations including sodium, potassium, calcium, and magnesium are common in industrial water supplies. Common anions include chloride, sulfate, and bicarbonate. Several methods are used to remove ions from input water supplies including reverse osmosis, distillation, and/or ion exchange. Distillation can be used to remove non-volatile metal cations and was historically used for water purification. However, distillation is energy-intensive compared to the combination of reverse osmosis and ion exchange which are more common in modern systems.

=== Organic carbon ===
The removal of organic carbon from water is one of the differentiators between deionized water and ultrapure water. Sources include bacteria, leaching from plastic piping, and dissolved atmospheric sources. Organic carbon can be removed using filtration by activated carbon and oxidation of organic carbon to carbon dioxide/bicarbonate.

=== Dissolved gases ===
Oxygen dissolved in water can lead to unwanted oxidation of silicon wafers and other materials while gases like carbon dioxide lead to unwanted acidification of water and must be removed. Gases can be removed through various methods including thermal or pressure degassing, membrane degassers or chemical degassing.

=== Silica ===
Silica naturally leaches from glass walls and enters water supplies. Dissolved silica, in the form of the silicate anion, can be removed through reverse osmosis or anion exchange. Solid, colloidal silica can be removed via ultrafiltration with or without coagulation to increase particle size.

== Applications ==
The primary industries using UPW are:

- semiconductor devices fabrication process
- solar photovoltaics
- pharmaceuticals
- power generation (sub and super critical boilers)
- specialty applications such as research laboratories.

The standards are based on the application. For instance, semiconductor plants use UPW as a cleaning agent, so it is important that the water not contain dissolved contaminants that can precipitate or particles that may lodge on circuits and cause microchip failures. The power industry uses UPW to make steam to drive steam turbines; pharmaceutical facilities use UPW as a cleaning agent, as well as an ingredient in products, so they seek water free of endotoxins, microbials, and viruses.

=== Applications in semiconductor industry ===
UPW is used extensively in the semiconductor industry where the highest grade of purity is required.

The use of UPW varies; it may be used to rinse the wafer after application of chemicals, to dilute the chemicals themselves, in optics systems for immersion photolithography, or as make-up to cooling fluid in some critical applications. UPW is even sometimes used as a humidification source for the cleanroom environment.

The primary, and most critical, application of UPW is in wafer cleaning in and after wet etching step during the FEOL stage. Impurities which can cause product contamination or impact process efficiency (e.g. etch rate) must be removed from the water during cleaning and etching stage. In chemical-mechanical polishing processes, water is used in addition to reagents and abrasive particles. As of 2002 1-2 parts of contaminating molecules per one million of water ones was considered to be an "ultrapure water" (e.g. semiconductor grade).

Water quality standards for use in the semiconductor industry
Test Parameter	Advanced Semiconductor UPW
Resistivity (25 °C)	>18.18 MΩ·cm
Total Organic Carbon (on-line for <10 ppb)	<1 μg/L
On-line dissolved oxygen	10 μg/L
On-line particles (>0.05 μm)	<200 particles/L
Non-Volatile Residue	100 ng/L
Silica (total and dissolved)	50 ng/L
Metals/Boron (by ICP/MS)	
22 most common elements (see F63-0213 for details)	<1–10 ng/L
Ions (by IC)	
7 major Anions and ammonium (see F63-0213 for details)	50 ng/L
Microbiological	
Bacteria	<1 CFU/100 mL

It is used in other types of electronics manufacturing in a similar fashion, such as flat-panel displays, discrete components (such as LEDs), hard disk drive platters (HDD) and solid-state drives NAND flash (SSDs), image sensors and image processors/ wafer-level optics (WLO), and crystalline silicon photovoltaics; the cleanliness requirements in the semiconductor industry, however, are currently the most stringent.

==== Reclaimed water as feedstock ====
As semiconductor fabrication has scaled, the volume of feedwater required for ultrapure water production has grown substantially, with advanced fabrication plants consuming several million gallons of UPW per day. To reduce reliance on freshwater withdrawals, some manufacturers have begun using reclaimed municipal or industrial wastewater as raw feedstock for UPW production. Reclaimed water typically contains higher levels of small-molecule organic pollutants such as urea, which are not effectively removed by conventional ion exchange, reverse osmosis, or ultraviolet treatment. As a result, advanced oxidation processes (AOPs), including UV-AOP and sulfate-radical–based methods, have been investigated as supplementary unit operations to meet the increasingly stringent total organic carbon specifications required for sub-7 nm device fabrication.

=== Applications in pharmaceutical industry ===
A typical use of ultrapure water in pharmaceutical and biotechnology industries is summarized in the table below:

Uses of ultrapure water in the pharmaceutical and biotechnology industries

Type	Use
Bacteriostatic water for injection	Diluent for ophthalmic and multiple-dose injections
Sterile water for inhalation	Diluent for inhalation therapy products
Sterile water for injection	Diluent for injections
Sterile water for irrigation	Diluent for internal irrigation therapy products
Water for injections in bulk	Water for the bulk preparation of medicines for parenteral administration

In order to be used for pharmaceutical and biotechnology applications for production of licensed human and veterinary health care products it must comply with the specification of the following pharmacopeias monographs:

- British Pharmacopoeia (BP): Purified water
- Japanese Pharmacopoeia (JP): Purified water
- European Pharmacopoeia (Ph Eur): Aqua purificata
- The United States Pharmacopoeia (USP): Purified water

Note: Purified Water is typically a main monograph which references other applications that use Ultrapure water

Ultrapure water is often used as a critical utility for cleaning applications (as required). It is also used to generate clean steam for sterilization.

The following table summarizes the specifications of two major pharmacopoeias for 'water for injection':

Pharmacopoeia specifications for water for injection

Properties	European Pharmacopoeia (Ph. Eur.)	United States Pharmacopeia (USP)
Conductivity (Note: If in-line conductivity exceeds values additional testing is required before a conclusion can be made. Refer to the respective pharmacopoeia for details.) (25 °C)	<1.3 μS/cm	<1.3 μS/cm
Total Organic Carbon (TOC)	<0.5 mg/L	<0.5 mg/L
Bacteria (guideline)	<10 CFU/100 mL	<10 CFU/100 mL
Endotoxin	<0.25 IU/mL	<0.25 EU/mL (Note: One USP Endotoxin Unit (EU) is equal to one International Unit (IU) of endotoxin)
Nitrates	<0.2 ppm	N/A
Aluminium	<10 ppb	N/A

== Analytical methods for ultrapure water ==
=== On-line analytical measurements ===
==== Conductivity/resistivity ====
In ultra-pure water systems, electrolytic conductivity or resistivity, which are reciprocals of each other, is used as a general indicator of water purity. Absolutely pure water has a conductivity of 0.05501 μS/cm and a resistivity of 18.18 MΩ⋅cm at 25 °C, and ultra-pure water is typically specified to approach or meet this target. Resistivity is highly sensitive to contamination by ions, and 0.1 ppb of sodium chloride decreases the resistivity to 18.11 MΩ⋅cm (equivalent to 0.05523 μS/cm).

Ultrapure water is easily contaminated by traces of carbon dioxide from the atmosphere passing through tiny leaks or diffusing through thin wall polymer tubing when sample lines are used for measurement. Carbon dioxide forms conductive carbonic acid in water which dissociates into H^{+} and bicarbonate. For this reason, conductivity probes are often used to provide continuous monitoring of conductivity/resistivity to ensure purity.

==== Sodium ====
Sodium is usually the first ion to break through a depleted cation exchanger. Sodium measurement can quickly detect this condition and is widely used as the indicator for cation exchange regeneration. The conductivity of cation exchange effluent is always quite high due to the presence of anions and hydrogen ion and therefore conductivity measurement is not useful for this purpose. On-line sodium measurement in ultrapure water most commonly uses a glass membrane sodium ion-selective electrode and a reference electrode in an analyzer measuring a small continuously flowing side-stream sample.

==== Dissolved oxygen ====
Advanced microelectronics manufacturing processes require dissolved oxygen (DO) concentrations to be <10 μg/L in the ultrapure rinse water to prevent oxidation of wafer films and layers. DO in power plant water and steam must be controlled to ppb levels to minimize corrosion.

Dissolved oxygen is measured by two basic technologies: electrochemical cell or optical fluorescence. Traditional electrochemical measurement uses a sensor with a gas-permeable membrane. Behind the membrane, electrodes immersed in an electrolyte develop an electric current directly proportional to the oxygen partial pressure of the sample.

Optical fluorescent DO sensors use a light source, a fluorophore and an optical detector. The fluorophore is immersed in the sample. Light is directed at the fluorophore which absorbs energy and then re-emits light at a longer wavelength. The duration and intensity of the re-emitted light is related to the dissolved oxygen partial pressure by the Stern–Volmer relationship. The signal is temperature compensated for the solubility of oxygen in water and the fluorophore characteristics to obtain the DO concentration value.

==== Silica ====
Silica is a contaminant that is detrimental to microelectronics processing and must be maintained at sub-ppb levels. In steam power generation silica can form deposits on heat-exchange surfaces where it reduces thermal efficiency. In high temperature boilers, silica will volatilize and carry over with steam where it can form deposits on turbine blades which lower aerodynamic efficiency. Total silica can be measured using atomic emission spectroscopy or mass spectrometry, while dissolved silica can be detected using colorimetric methods. In the colorimetric method, reagents including molybdate are added to solution which creates a blue silico-molybdate complex that can be detected using UV-Vis spectroscopy.

==== Particles ====
Particles in UPW have always presented a major problem for semiconductor manufacture, as any particle landing on a silicon wafer can bridge the gap between the electrical pathways in the semiconductor circuitry. Particle count can be monitored in ultrapure water using laser-based particle counting systems or, for diagnostics, scanning electron microscopy.

==== Non-volatile residue ====
Another type of contamination in UPW is dissolved inorganic material, primarily silica. Any dissolved inorganic material has the potential to remain on the wafer as the UPW dries. Nonvolatile material can be detected by using nebulizer to create small droplets liquid suspended in a stream of gas. These droplets are dried an aerosol of non-volatile residue particles that can be counted by light scattering techniques.

==== TOC ====
Total organic carbon is measured by oxidizing organic molecules in the water to CO_{2} and measuring the increase in the CO_{2} concentration in the water after the oxidation. This change in carbon dioxide, or delta CO_{2}, is used to determine concentration of organic carbon.

===== Organic oxidation methods for TOC analysis =====
Oxidation of organics to CO_{2} is most commonly achieved in liquid solutions by the creation of the highly oxidizing chemical species, the hydroxyl radical (OH•). Organic oxidation in a combustion environment involves the creation of other energized molecular oxygen species. For the typical TOC levels in UPW systems most methods utilize hydroxyl radicals in the liquid phase.

There are multiple methods to create sufficient concentrations of hydroxyl radicals needed to completely oxidize the organics in water to CO_{2}, each method being appropriate for different water purity levels. For typical raw waters feeding into the front end of an UPW purification system the raw water can contain TOC levels between 0.7 mg/L to 15 mg/L and require a robust oxidation method that can ensure there is enough oxygen available to completely convert all the carbon atoms in the organic molecules into CO_{2}. Robust oxidation methods that supply sufficient oxygen include the following methods; Ultraviolet light (UV) & persulfate, heated persulfate, combustion, and super critical oxidation. Typical equations showing persulfate generation of hydroxyl radicals follows.

S_{2}O^{2−}_{8} + hν (254 nm) → 2 SO^{−}_{4}• and SO^{−}_{4} • + H_{2}O → HSO^{−}_{4} + OH •

When the organic concentration is less than 1 mg/L as TOC and the water is saturated with oxygen UV light is sufficient to oxidize the organics to CO_{2}, this is a simpler oxidation method. The wavelength of the UV light for the lower TOC waters must be less than 200 nm and is typically 184 nm generated by a low pressure Hg vapor lamp. The 184 nm UV light is energetic enough to break the water molecule into OH and H radicals. The hydrogen radicals quickly react to create H_{2}. The equations follow:

H_{2}O + hν (185 nm) → OH• + H • and H • + H • → H_{2}

Different types of UPW TOC Analyzers

IC (Inorganic Carbon) = CO_{2} + HCO^{−}_{3} + CO^{2−}_{3}

TC (Total Carbon) = Organic Carbon + IC

TOC (Total Organic Carbon) = TC – IC

H_{2}O + hν (185 nm) → OH• + H •

S_{2}O^{2−}_{8} + hν (254 nm) → 2 SO^{−}_{4} •

SO^{−}_{4} • + H_{2}O → HSO^{−}_{4} + OH •

=== Offline lab analysis ===
When testing the quality of UPW, consideration is given to where that quality is required and where it is to be measured. The point of distribution or delivery (POD) is the point in the system immediately after the last treatment step and before the distribution loop. It is the standard location for the majority of analytical tests. The point of connection (POC) is another commonly used point for measuring quality of UPW. It is located at the outlet of the submain or lateral take off valve used for UPW supply to the tool.

Grab sample UPW analyses are either complementary to the on-line testing or alternative, depending on the availability of the instruments and the level of the UPW quality specifications. Grab sample analysis is typically performed for the following parameters: metals, anions, ammonium, silica (both dissolved and total), particles by SEM (scanning electron microscope), TOC (total organic compounds) and specific organic compounds.

Metal analyses are typically performed by ICP-MS (Inductively coupled plasma mass spectrometry). The detection level depends on the specific type of the instrument used and the method of the sample preparation and handling. Current state-of-the-art methods allow reaching sub-ppt (parts per trillion) level (< 1 ppt) typically tested by ICPMS.

The anion analysis for seven most common inorganic anions (sulfate, chloride, fluoride, phosphate, nitrite, nitrate, and bromide) is performed by ion chromatography (IC), reaching single digit ppt detection limits. IC is also used to analyze ammonia and other metal cations. However ICPMS is the preferred method for metals due to lower detection limits and its ability to detect both dissolved and non-dissolved metals in UPW. IC is also used for the detection of urea in UPW down to the 0.5 ppb level. Urea is one of the more common contaminants in UPW and probably the most difficult for treatment.

Silica analysis in UPW typically includes determination of reactive and total silica. Due to the complexity of silica chemistry, the form of silica measured is defined by the photometric (colorimetric) method as molybdate-reactive silica. Those forms of silica that are molybdate-reactive include dissolved simple silicates, monomeric silica and silicic acid, and an undetermined fraction of polymeric silica. Total silica determination in water employs high resolution ICPMS, GFAA (graphite furnace atomic absorption), and the photometric method combined with silica digestion. For many natural waters, a measurement of molybdate-reactive silica by this test method provides a close approximation of total silica, and, in practice, the colorimetric method is frequently substituted for other more time-consuming techniques. However, total silica analysis becomes more critical in UPW, where the presence of colloidal silica is expected due to silica polymerization in the ion exchange columns. Colloidal silica is considered more critical than dissolved in the electronic industry due to the bigger impact of nano-particles in water on the semiconductor manufacturing process. Sub-ppb (parts per billion) levels of silica make it equally complex for both reactive and total silica analysis, making the choice of total silica test often preferred.

Although particles and TOC are usually measured using on-line methods, there is significant value in complementary or alternative off-line lab analysis. The value of the lab analysis has two aspects: cost and speciation. Smaller UPW facilities that cannot afford to purchase on-line instrumentation often choose off-line testing. TOC can be measured in the grab sample at a concentration as low as 5 ppb, using the same technique employed for the on-line analysis (see on-line method description). This detection level covers the majority of needs of less critical electronic and all pharmaceutical applications. When speciation of the organics is required for troubleshooting or design purposes, liquid chromatography-organic carbon detection (LC-OCD) provides an effective analysis. This method allows for identification of biopolymers, humics, low molecular weight acids and neutrals, and more, while characterizing nearly 100% of the organic composition in UPW with sub-ppb level of TOC.

Similar to TOC, SEM particle analysis represents a lower cost alternative to the expensive online measurements and therefore it is commonly a method of choice in less critical applications. SEM analysis can provide particle counting for particle size down to 50 nm, which generally is in-line with the capability of online instruments. The test involves installation of the SEM capture filter cartridge on the UPW sampling port for sampling on the membrane disk with the pore size equal or smaller than the target size of the UPW particles. The filter is then transferred to the SEM microscope where its surface is scanned for detection and identification of the particles. The main disadvantage of SEM analysis is long sampling time. Depending on the pore size and the pressure in the UPW system, the sampling time can be between one week and one month. However, typical robustness and stability of the particle filtration systems allow for successful applications of the SEM method. Application of Energy Dispersive X-ray Spectroscopy (SEM-EDS) provides compositional analysis of the particles, making SEM also helpful for systems with on-line particle counters.

Bacteria analysis is typically conducted following ASTM method F1094. The test method covers sampling and analysis of high purity water from water purification systems and water transmission systems by the direct sampling tap and filtration of the sample collected in the bag. These test methods cover both the sampling of water lines and the subsequent microbiological analysis of the sample by the culture technique. The microorganisms recovered from the water samples and counted on the filters include both aerobes and facultative anaerobes. The temperature of incubation is controlled at 28 ± 2 °C, and the period of incubation is 48 h or 72 h, if time permits. Longer incubation times are typically recommended for most critical applications. However 48 hrs is typically sufficient to detect water quality upsets.

== Transport ==
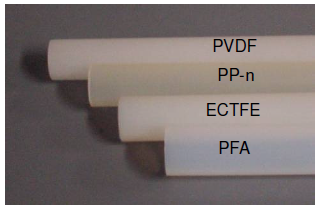
Various thermoplastic pipes used in UPW systems.

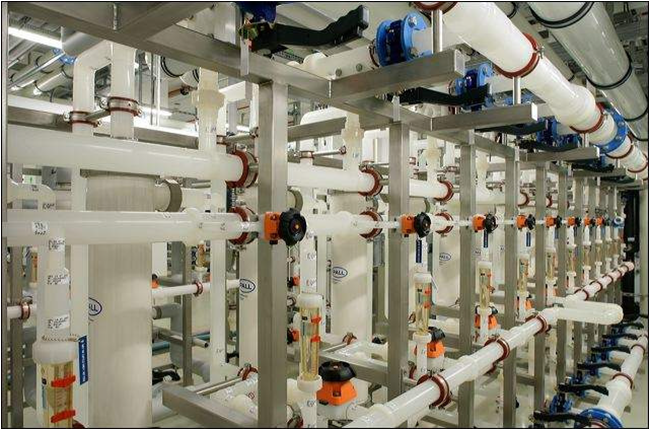
A UPW installation using PVDF piping.

Stainless steel remains a piping material of choice for the pharmaceutical industry. Due to its metallic contribution, most steel was removed from microelectronics UPW systems in the 1980s and replaced with high performance polymers of polyvinylidene fluoride (PVDF), perfluoroalkoxy (PFA), ethylene chlorotrifluoroethylene (ECTFE) and polytetrafluoroethylene (PTFE) in the US and Europe. In Asia, polyvinyl chloride (PVC), chlorinated polyvinyl chloride (CPVC) and polypropylene (PP) are popular, along with the high performance polymers.
