= List of paper mills =

This is a list of paper mills and pulp mills sorted by country.

== Algeria ==
- GIPEC SPA, Baba-Ali Mill, Bilda

== Argentina ==
- Papel Prensa, San Pedro Pulp and Paper Mill, San Pedro, Buenos Aires Province

== Australia ==
- ABC Tissue Products, Sydney
- Asaleo Care
  - Box Hill Mill, Box Hill, Victoria
- Australian Paper
  - Alphington Paper Mill, Alphington, Victoria
  - Maryvale Mill, Morwell, Victoria
  - Shoalhaven Mill, S3, Bomaderry, New South Wales (closed July 2015)
- Orora Fibre and Packaging
  Orora Botany Mill, Botany, New South Wales
- Encore Tissue, Melbourne
- Kimberly-Clark, Millicent
- Norske Skog
  Norske Skog Albury, Albury, New South Wales (sold to Visy in 2019)
  Boyer Mill, Boyer, Tasmania
- Queensland Tissue Products, Brisbane
- Visy Paper
  Visy Smithfield Mill, Smithfield, New South Wales
  Visy Coolaroo Mill, Coolaroo, Victoria
  Visy Gibson Island Mill, Gibson Island, Queensland
  Visy Reservoir Mill, Reservoir, Victoria
  Visy Tumut Mill, Tumut, New South Wales

== Austria ==
- Mayr-Melnhof
  Frohnleiten Mill, Frohnleiten
  Hirschwang Mill, Reichenau an der Rax
- Norske Skog Bruck
- Salzer Paper
- Smurfit Kappa Nettingsdorfer
- Wattenspapier
- Steyrermühl
- Sappi Gratkorn
- Brigl & Bergmeister
- Mondi Frantschach

== Bangladesh ==
- Azmat Ali Paper and Board Mills Pvt Ltd
- Bashundhara Paper Mills
- Karnaphuli Paper Mills, Chittagong
- Manz-Fi Paper Mills Ltd. (Munshigonj)
- Odyssey Multilink Ltd. Diakhaly, Zirabo, Ashulia.
- Hakkani Paper & Board Mills Pvt. Limited. Chattogram
- Creative Paper Mills Limited (Narayanganj)
- Meghna Pulp and Paper Mills Ltd.
- Tanveer Paper Mills Ltd.
- Alnoor Paper Mills Ltd.
- Mainuddin Paper Mills Ltd.
- Mohiuddin Paper Mills Ltd.
- Lipy Paper Mills Ltd.
- Afil Paper Mills Ltd. (Cigarettes paper)
- Asian Paper Mills Ltd
- TK Paper and Board Mills Ltd.
- Sonali Paper Mills Ltd.
- Younus Paper Mills Ltd.
- Ananta Paper Mills Ltd.
- Astia Paper Mills Ltd.
- Base Papers Ltd.
- Haji Paper Industries Ltd.
- Capital Paper and Board Mills Ltd.
- Purbachal Paper Mills Ltd.
- Partex Paper Mills Ltd.
- Amber super and Board Mills Ltd.
- Makka Paper and Board Mills Ltd.
- Lina Paper Mills Ltd.
- Ajmatali Paper Mills Ltd.
- Raja Paper Mills Ltd.
- Kibria Paper Mills Ltd.
- Bhai bhai board Mills Ltd.
- Azad Paper Industries Ltd.
- Mohera Paper Mills Ltd.
- Ali Paper Mills Ltd.
- Hakkaki Board Mills Ltd.
- Adhunik Paper and Board Mills Ltd.
- Bangladesh Paper Mills Ltd.
- MAP Paper Mills Ltd.
- SA Paper Mills Ltd.
- Hasan Paper and Board Mills Ltd.
- Shahjalal Paper Mills Ltd.
- Najma Paper Mills Ltd
- Project Ehsan Paper Products (Pvt.) Ltd

== Belgium ==
- Sappi, Lanaken Paper Mill, Lanaken
- Stora Enso, Langerbrugge
- Burgo, Burgo Ardennes mill, Virton

== Brazil ==
- Celulose Irani, Vargem Bonita Mill, Vargem Bonita
- Fibria
  Aracruz Barra do Riacho Mill, Aracruz
  VCP Três Lagoas Pulp Mill, Três Lagoas
- Jari Celulose
  Nova Campina Mill, Nova Campina
  Paulínia Mill, Paulínia
  Suzano Mill, Suzano
- Klabin
- Munksjö Paper, Jacarei Paper Mill, Jacareí
- Suzano Papel e Celulose
- Stora Enso and Suzano Papel e Celulose joint venture, Veracel, Eunápolis

== Canada ==
- Domtar
  Windsor Mill, Windsor, Quebec
  Espanola Mill, Espanola, Ontario (Indefinitely Idled 2023)
- Kruger
  Bromptonville Mill, Brompton, Quebec
  Corner Brook Pulp & Paper, Corner Brook
  Trois-Rivieres Mill, Trois-Rivières, Quebec
- Nordic Kraft
  Lebel-sur-Quévillon Kraft Mill, Lebel-sur-Quévillon, Quebec
- Paper Excellence Group
  - Howe Sound Pulp & Paper, Sunshine Coast (British Columbia), BC
- Resolute Forest Products
  Alma Mill, Quebec
  Amos Mill, Quebec
  Clermont Mill, Quebec
  Kenogami Mill, Quebec
  Dolbeau Mill, Quebec
  Thunder Bay Mill, Ontario
  Barber Paper Mill, Ontario
- WestRock, La Tuque Mill, La Tuque, Quebec

== Chile ==
- Celulosa Arauco y Constitución
  Arauco Pulp Mill, Arauco
  Constitución Pulp Mill, Constitución
  Licancel Pulp Mill, Licantén
  Nueva Aldea Pulp Mill, Nueva Aldea
  Valdivia Pulp Mill, San José de la Mariquina
- CMPC
  Laja Mill, Laja
  Maule Mill, Maule
  Pacifico Mill, Mininco
  Santa Fe Mill, Nacimiento
  Valdivia Mill, Valdivia

== China ==
- Asia Pacific Resources International Holdings (APRIL)
- APRIL SSYMB (former Shandong Rizhao SSYMB Pulp and Paper), Shandong
- C&S Paper Chengdu, Sichuan
- C&S Paper Jiangmen, Guangdong
- Chenming Paper
- Chenzhou Yunong Paper
- Chongqing Wei Er Mei Paper, Chongqing
- Dongguan Jianhui Paper
- Dongguan Jinzhou Paper
- Fook Woo Group Huizhou, Guangdong
- Fujian Hengli, Nanan, Fujian
- Fushun Paper Co Ltd, Liaoning
- Gold East Paper, Jiangsu
- Guangxi Nanning Phoenix Pulp & Paper, Nanning, Guangxi
- Jinhai Pulp Mill, Yangpu Economic Development Zone, Hainan
- Lee & Man Paper, Chongqing
- Panda Thermal Paper Roll Company
- Sichuann Jinan Pulp & Paper, Suining, Sichuan
- Sichuan Yibin Lizhuang, Yibin, Sichuan
- Vinda International, Guangdong
- Weifang Henglian Paper Group, Weifang, Shandong
- Xiamen Xinyang Paper, Xiamen, Fujian
- Yuen Foong Yu Paper, Yangzhou, Jiangsu
- Zhejiang JingXing Paper, Pinghu, Zhejiang
- Zhenjiang Gold River Pulp & Paper
- Taizhou Forest Packing Group

== Denmark ==
- Bruunshaab Gamle Papfabrik
- Dansk Bølgepap Industri
- De forenede Papirfabrikker
- Frederiksberg Papirfabrik
- Havreholm Papirfabrik
- Silkeborg Papirfabrik
- Skarrildhus
- Strandmøllen
- Ørholm

== Egypt ==
- Solo Soft for Hygienic Paper, 6th of October Industrial Zone
- Al Zeina Tissue Mill, 10th of Ramadan City
- Mediterranean Tissue Mill, Alexandria
- Nuqul Group

- Al Bardi Paper Mill, 6th of October City
- Al Sindian Paper Mill, 6th of October City

- Shotmed Paper Industries

== Finland ==
- Ahlstrom, Kauttua Paper Mill, Eura
- BillerudKorsnäs
  Pietarsaari Paper Mill, Jakobstad
  Tervasaari Paper Mill, Tervasaari
- Georgia-Pacific, Nokia Paper Mill, Nokia
- Metsä Board
  Kyro Paper Mill, Hämeenkyrö
  Simpele Paper Mill, Rautjärvi
  Äänekoski Paper Mill, Äänekoski
- Metsä Tissue, Mänttä Paper Mill, Mänttä
- Mondi, Lohja Paper Mill, Lohja (closed 2015)
- Sappi
  Kangas Paper Mill, Jyväskylä (closed 2010)
  Kirkniemi Paper Mill, Lohja
- Stora Enso
  Anjala Paper Mill, Anjalankoski
  Kaukopää Paper Mill, Imatra
  Oulu Paper Mill, Oulu
  Tainionkoski Paper Mill, Imatra
  Varkaus Paper Mill, Varkaus
  Veitsiluoto Paper Mill, Kemi
- UPM-Kymmene Corporation
  Jämsänkoski Paper Mill, Jämsä
  Kaukas Paper Mill, Lappeenranta
  Kymi Paper Mill, Kouvola
  Rauma Paper Mill, Rauma
  Tervasaari Paper Mill, Valkeakoski
  Wisapaper Paper Mill, Jakobstad

== France ==
- DS Smith
  Chouanard Paper Mill, Coullons
  Kaysersberg Paper Mill, Kaysersberg
  Nantes Paper Mill, Nantes
- Glatfelter, Glatfelter Scaer SAS, Scaer
- M-real, Alizay Paper Mill, Alizay
- Munksjö Paper (sv:Munksjö)
  Munksjö Arches SAS, Arches
  La Gère Paper Mill, Pont-Évêque
  Rottersac Paper Mill, Lalinde

== Germany ==
- DS Smith
  Aschaffenburg Paper Mill, Aschaffenburg
  Witzenhausen Paper Mill, Witzenhausen
- Heinzel,
  Raubling Papier GmbH, Raubling
- Glatfelter
  Glatfelter Dresden GmbH, Dresden
  Gernsbach
- Klingele Paper mill
- Mayr-Melnhof
  Baiersbronn Frischfaser Karton, Baiersbronn
  Mayr-Melnhof Gernsbach, Gernsbach
  FS-Karton, Neuss
- Mercer
  Mercer Zellstoff Rosenthal, Rosenthal
  Mercer Zellstoff Stendal, Stendal
- M-real, Zanders Paper Mill, Zanders
- Munksjö Paper (sv:Munksjö)
  Dettingen Paper Mill, Dettingen an der Erms
  Unterkochen Paper Mill, Aalen
- Norske Skog Walsum Duisburg
- Palm Paper
  Aalen
  Eltmann
  Wörth am Rhein
- Mitsubishi Paper Mills, HiTec Paper
  Bielefeld
  Flensburg
- Sappi
  Alfeld Paper Mill, Alfeld
  Ehingen Paper Mill, Ehingen
  Stockstadt Paper Mill, Stockstadt am Main

Schoellershammer's logo

- Schoellershammer
- Stora Enso
  Eilenburg Paper Mill, Eilenburg
  Hagen Paper Mill, Hagen
  Maxau Paper Mill, Maxau
- UPM-Kymmene Corporation, Nordland Papier

== Greece ==
- Diana (Thrace Paper Mill), Bankrupt, Aigaleo
- Elina (Komotini Paper Mill S.A.), Aigaleo

== India ==
- Paswara Papers Limited
- Shree Ajit Pulp and Paper Limited
- Disha Industries Pvt Limited
- Hindustan Paper Corporation
  Hindustan Paper Corporation Ltd. Township Area Panchgram - Cachar Paper Mill, Panchgram, Assam
  Nagaon Paper Mills, Kagaj Nagar, Jagiroad, Assam
- JK Paper Ltd
- Ballarpur Industries
- Century Pulp & Paper, Lalkua
- Khanna Paper Mills
- Millenium Papers, Morbi
- Mysore Paper Mills
- Bluecat Paper
- Orient Paper Mills
- Punalur Paper Mills, Punalur
- Sirpur Paper Mills
- Tamil Nadu Newsprint and Papers Limited
- Seshasayee Paper And Boards
- The South India Paper Mills
- Trident Paper Mills
- West Coast Paper Mills, Dandeli
- Bellona Paper Mill Pvt Ltd, Morbi, Gujarat
- Andhra Paper Ltd, Rajahmundry
- Jodhani Papers Pvt Ltd, Bengaluru
- Chandpur Enterprises Ltd.
- Proton Paper Industry, Morbi, Gujarat
- Amaravathi Sri Venkatesa Paper Mills Ltd, Udumalpet, Tamil Nadu.

== Iran ==
- Security Paper Mill (TAKAB), Amol County, Mazandaran Province
- Mazandaran Wood and Paper mill (Mazandaran Wood and Paper Company), Sari County, Mazandaran Province

Pars Paper Co., producer of bagasse pulp from sugarcane, it is located in south of Iran. Bagasse pulp is used for making paper also tissue and food contact biodegradable tableware and food containers.

== Israel ==
- Hadera Paper Mill, Hadera, Israel

== Italy ==
- DS Smith, Lucca Paper Mill, Lucca
- Fedrigoni
  Arco Paper Mill, Arco, Trentino
  Varone Paper Mill, Varone
  Verona Paper Mill, Verona
  - Cartiere Miliani Fabriano, Fabriano
    Fabriano Paper Mill, Fabriano
    Pioraco Paper Mill, Pioraco
    Rocchetta Paper Mill, Fabriano
- Industria Cartaria Pieretti
- Cartiera San Martino

== Indonesia ==
- Asia Pulp & Paper
- Asia Pacific Resources International Holdings (APRIL)
  - Indah Kiat Perawang Paper Mill

== Japan ==
- Chuetsu Pulp
- Daio Paper
- Hokuetsu Corporation
- Mitsubishi Paper Mills
- Nippon Paper Industry
- Oji Paper Company
- Rengo Co.
  Amagasaki Mill
  Kanazu Mill
  Tonegawa Mill
  Yashio Mill
  Yodogawa Mill
- Tokushu-Tokai Paper
- Tomoegawa Paper
- Hyogo Pulp

== Jordan ==
- Nuqul Group

- Al-Keena Paper Mill, Amman
- Al-Snobar Paper Mill, Amman

== Korea ==
- Hansol Paper
- Moorim Paper
- Hankuk Paper

== Malaysia ==
- Sabah Forest Industries, Sipitang, Sabah
- Nibong Tebal Paper Mill

== Netherlands ==
- DS Smith, De Hoop Paper Mill, Eerbeek
- Mayr-Melnhof, Mayr-Melnhof Eerbeek, Eerbeek
- Sappi

Maastricht Paper Mill, Maastricht
Nijmegen Paper Mill, Nijmegen, (Closed 2015)

- Schut Papier, Heelsum
- Smurfit Kappa, Roermond
- Coldenhove Papier, Eerbeek
- Crown Van Gelder, Velsen-Noord

== Nepal ==
Shree Maruti Paper & Chemical Industries Limited

== New Zealand ==
- Norske Skog Tasman, Kawerau
- Oji Fibre Solutions
  - Tasman Mill, Kawerau
  - Kinleith Mill, Tokoroa
  - Penrose Mill, Auckland
- Asaleo Care Tasman, Kawerau
- Whakatane Board Mill Whakatane, Whakatane
- PanPacific Forest Products, Napier
- Winstone Pulp International Karioi, Ohakune

== Norway ==
- Bamble Cellulosefabrikk (Closed 1978)
- Hunsfos Fabrikker, Vennesla (Closed 2011)
- Mayr-Melnhof, MMK FollaCell, Follafoss
- Nordic Paper, Greåker Paper Mill, Greåker
- Norske Skog
  Norske Skog Follum, Hønefoss (Closed 2012)
  Norske Skog Saugbrugs, Halden
  Norske Skog Skogn, Levanger
  Norske Skog Union, Skien (Closed 2006)
- Peterson, Ranheim Papirfabrikk, Ranheim
- Union (Union CO) Skotfoss Bruk, Skotfoss (Closed 1986)

== Pakistan ==
Bulleh Shah Packaging (Pvt) Ltd. Kasur, Punjab Pakistan

- Century Paper & Board Mills, Bhai Pheru
- Pakistan papersack division thal limited hub, Karachi

https://thalpackaging.com/

DATA Paper Mill, Kasur Road Punjab, Pakistan Ceo: Ishtiaq Malik.

== Poland ==
- International Paper - Kwidzyn
- Arctic Paper - Kostrzyń nad Odrą
- Polska Wytwórnia Papierów Wartościowych - Warszawa

== Portugal ==
- Portucel Soporcel
  Cacia Pulp and Paper Mill,
  Figueira da Foz Pulp and Paper Mill, Figueira da Foz
  Setúbal Pulp and Paper Mill, Setúbal
- Altri
  Celbi, Celulose Beira Industrial S.A, Figueira da Foz
  Caima-Indústria de Celulose S.A., Constância
  Celtejo, Empresa de Celulose do Tejo, S.A., Vila Velha de Ródão

== Russia ==
- Mondi, Syktyvkar Paper Mill, Syktyvkar
- ZAO International Paper (former OAO Svetogorsk), Svetogorsk
- Ilim Group (previously Kotlas Pulp and Paper Mill), Koryazhma

== Slovakia ==
- Mondi, Ruzomberok

== Slovenia ==
- Mayr-Melnhof, Kolicevo Karton, Količevo

== South Africa ==
- Sappi, South Africa
- Mondi, South Africa

== Sri Lanka ==
- Valaichchenai Paper Mill, Valaichchenai
- Embilipitiya Paper Mill, Embilipitiya

== Sweden ==
- Aditya Birla Group, Domsjö Fabriker, Örnsköldsvik
- Arctic Paper
  Grycksbo Paper Mill, Grycksbo
  Munkedal Paper Mill, Munkedal
- BillerudKorsnäs
  Frövi/Rockhammar Paper Mill, Frövi
  Gruvön Paper Mill, Grums
  Gävle Paper Mill, Gävle
  Karlsborg Paper Mill, Karlsborg, Kalix
  Skärblacka Paper Mill, Skärblacka
- Crane & Co., Tumba Bruk, Tumba
- Gustavsfors Paper Mill, Gustavsfors
- Holmen AB
  Braviken Paper Mill, Norrköping
  Hallsta Paper Mill, Hallstavik
  Iggesund Paperboard, Iggesund, Hudiksvall
- Lafarge, Örebro Paper Mill, Örebro (Closed 2010)
- Lessebo Bruk AB, Lessebo Paper Mill, Lessebo
- Metsä Board, Husum Paper Mill, Husum
- Metsä Tissue
  Katrinefors Mill, Mariestad
  Nyboholm Mill, Kvillsfors
  Pauliström Mill, Pauliström
- Mondi, Dynäs Paper Mill, Dynäs
- Munksjö Paper
  Aspa Paper Mill, Aspa
  Billingsfors Paper Mill, Billingsfors
  Jönköping Paper Mill, Jönköping
- Nordic Paper
  Bäckhammar Paper Mill, Bäckhammar
  Säffle Paper Mill, Säffle
  Åmotfors Paper Mill, Åmotfors
- Rottneros AB
  Rottneros Paper Mill, Rottneros
  Vallvik Paper Mill, Vallvik
- Smurfit Kappa, Lövholmen Paper Mill, Lövholmen
- Stora Enso
  Fors Paper Mill, Fors
  Hylte Paper Mill, Hyltebruk
  Kvarnsveden Paper Mill, Kvarnsveden
  Nymölla Paper Mill, Nymölla
  Skoghall Paper Mill, Skoghall
  Skutskär Pulp Mill, Skutskär
- Svanskogs Bruk, Svanskog
- SCA
  Edet Paper Mill, Edet
  Munksund Paper Mill, Munksund
  Obbola Paper Mill, Obbola
  SCA tissue, Jönköping
  Östrand Paper Mill, Timrå
  Ortviken Paper Mill, Sundsvall
- Svenska Pappersbruket, Klippan Paper Mill, Klippans bruk
- Swedish Tissue, Kisa Paper Mill, Kisa
- Södra
  Mönsterås Paper Mill, Mönsterås
  Mörrum Paper Mill, Mörrum
  Värö Paper Mill, Väröbacka
- Waggeryd Cell, Waggeryd Paper Mill, Vaggeryd

== Switzerland ==
- Sappi, Biberist Paper Mill, Biberist (Closed 2011)

== Taiwan ==
- Yuen Foong Yu Paper, Taipei
  Chang Kung Mill, Wu Zu
  Chiu Tang Mill, Ta Shu Hsiang
  Hsin Wu Mill, Hsin Wu
  Taitung Paper Mill, Taitung
  Yangmei Mill, Taoyuan City

== Trinidad & Tobago ==
- Grand Bay Paper Products/Trinidad Tissues Limited,

== Thailand ==
- Double A (1991) Plc Co Ltd, Pulp & Paper
- SCG Paper, Pulp & Paper

== United Kingdom ==
- Pelta Medical Papers, Beetham, Cumbria
- Bridgewater Paper Co, Ellesmere Port (Closed 2010)
- DS Smith
  Kemsley Paper Mill, Kemsley
  Wansbrough Paper Mill, Watchet
- Frogmore Paper Mill, Hemel Hempstead, Hertfordshire
- Glatfelter, Glatfelter Lydney Ltd, Lydney, England
- Higher Kings Mill, Cullompton
- Holmen AB, Workington Mill, Workington
- Palm Paper, King's Lynn Mill, King's Lynn
- UPM-Kymmene Corporation, UPM Shotton Paper Mill, Shotton, North Wales
- Smurfit Kappa, Townsend Hook, Snodland.

== United States ==
- Allied Paper Corporation, Kalamazoo, Michigan
- Clearwater Paper, Spokane, Washington
  Arkansas Paperboard Mill, Arkansas City, Arkansas
  Lewiston Paper Mill, Lewiston, Idaho
  Warren Paper Mill, Warren, Arkansas
- Cincinnati Steam Paper Mill
- Congoleum Corp., Construction Paper Mill, Finksburg, Maryland
- Cottrell Paper Co Inc., Rock City Falls Paper Mill, Rock City Falls, New York
- Crane & Co., Dalton, Massachusetts (Main supplier of paper for the U.S. dollar)
- Curtis Paper Mill, Newark, Delaware (Closed paper mill also known as the Nonantum Mill)
- Domtar
  Ashdown Paper Mill, Ashdown, Arkansas
  Hawesville Paper Mill, Hawesville, Kentucky
  Johnsonburg Paper Mill, Johnsonburg, Pennsylvania
  Kingsport Paper Mill, Kingsport, Tennessee
  Marlboro Paper Mill, Bennettsville, South Carolina
  Nekoosa Paper Mill, Nekoosa, Wisconsin
  Plymouth Paper Mill, Plymouth, North Carolina
  Port Huron Paper Mill, Port Huron, Michigan (closed 2021)
  Rothschild Paper Mill, Rothschild, Wisconsin
- French Paper Company, Niles, Michigan
- Georgia-Pacific
  Camas Paper Mill, Camas, Washington
  Crossett Paper Mill, Crossett, Arkansas
  Palatka Paper Mill, Palatka, Florida
  Toledo Mill, Toledo, Oregon
- Glatfelter, Charlotte, North Carolina
- Graham Paper Company

- Cupples Station Paper Mill, St. Louis, Missouri (opened in 1900)
- North Broadway Paper Mill, St. Louis, Missouri (opened in 1957)

- Great Northern Paper Company, East Millinocket, Maine (closed 2011)
- Green Bay Packaging, Green Bay, Wisconsin

- Green Bay Packaging, Morrilton, Arkansas

- Hollingsworth & Vose, Walpole, Massachusetts
- International Paper, Memphis, Tennessee
  Albany Paper Mill, Albany, Oregon (Closed in 2009, demolished in 2012)
  Augusta Paper Mill, Augusta, Georgia
  Bogalusa Paper Mill, Bogalusa, Louisiana
  Cedar Rapids Paper Mill, Cedar Rapids, Iowa
  Courtland Paper Mill, Courtland, Alabama (Closing completely in 2014)
  Franklin Paper Mill, Franklin, Virginia (Closed in 2009 but recommissioned in 2012)
  Georgetown Paper Mill, Georgetown, South Carolina
  Henderson Paper Mill, Henderson, Kentucky
  Louisiana Paper Mill, Bastrop, Louisiana (Closed in 2008)
  Mansfield Paper Mill, Mansfield, Louisiana
  Pensacola Paper Mill, Cantonment, Florida
  Pine Hill Paper Mill, Pine Hill, Alabama
  Pineville Paper Mill, Pineville, Louisiana (Closed in 2009)
  Prattville Paper Mill, Prattville, Alabama
  Red River Paper Mill, Campti, Louisiana
  Riegelwood Paper Mill, Riegelwood, North Carolina
  Riverdale Paper Mill, Selma, Alabama
  Rome Paper Mill, Rome, Georgia
  Savannah Paper Mill, Savannah, Georgia
  Texarkana Paper Mill, Texarkana, Texas
  Valliant Paper Mill, Valliant, Oklahoma
  Vicksburg Paper Mill, Redwood, Mississippi
- Kalamazoo Vegetable Parchment Company (2 Mills), Parchment, Michigan (Closed paper mill operated by Crown Vantage prior to closure.)
- Kapstone, Northbrook, Illinois
  Charleston Kraft Paper Mill, North Charleston, South Carolina
  Cowpens Recycled Paper Mill, Cowpens, South Carolina
  Longview Kraft Paper Mill, Longview, Washington
  Roanoke Rapids Kraft Paper Mill, Roanoke Rapids, North Carolina
- Kimberly-Clark, Irving, Texas
- Kraft Group
  - Catawba paper mill
- Lincoln Paper and Tissue, Lincoln, Maine (closed in 2013 tissue part recommissioned in 2014 paper part still closed)(Filed for Chapter 11 bankruptcy September 28, 2015)(Closed December 2015)
- ND Paper
  Biron Paper Mill, Biron, Wisconsin
  Old Town paper mill, Old Town, Maine
  Rumford Paper Mill, Rumford, Maine
- Monadnock Paper Mills, Benington, New Hampshire
- Packaging Corporation of America
  Counce Paper Mill, Counce, Tennessee
  DeRidder Paper Mill, DeRidder, Louisiana
  Filer City Paper Mill, Filer City, Michigan
  International Falls Paper Mill, International Falls, Minnesota
  Jackson Paper Mill, Jackson, Alabama
  St. Helens Paper Mill, St. Helens, Oregon
  Tomahawk Paper Mill, Tomahawk, Wisconsin
  Valdosta Paper Mill, Valdosta, Georgia
  Wallula Paper Mill, Wallula, Washington
- Parsons Paper Company, Holyoke, Massachusetts (closed 2005)
- Pixelle Specialty Solutions (formerly Glatfelter Specialty Papers)
  Androscoggin Paper Mill, Jay, Maine
  Chillicothe Paper Mill, Chillicothe, Ohio (closing 2025)
  Fremont Paper Mill, Fremont, Ohio
  Spring Grove Paper Mill, Spring Grove, Pennsylvania
  Stevens Point Paper Mill, Stevens Points, Wisconsin
- Port Townsend Paper Company Port Townsend, Washington
- Resolute Forest Products, Augusta, Georgia
  Calhoun Mill, Calhoun, Tennessee
  Coosa Pines Mill, Childersburg, Alabama
  Grenada Paper Mill, Grenada, Mississippi
  Hialeah Tissue Mill, Hialeah, Florida
  Menominee Mill, Menominee, Michigan
  Sanford Tissue Mill, Sanford, Florida
  Resolute Forest Products, Catawba, South Carolina
- Sappi
  S. D. Warren Paper Mill, Westbrook, Maine
  Somerset Paper Mill, Skowhegan, Maine
  Cloquet Paper Mill, Cloquet, Minnesota
- Scott Paper Company, Philadelphia, Pennsylvania (defunct)
- Sylvamo
  Ticonderoga Mill, Ticonderoga, New York
  Eastover Mill, Eastover, South Carolina
- Twin Rivers Paper Company, Madawaska, Maine
  HQ & Maine Paper Operation, Madawaska, Maine
  New York Paper Operations
  Arkansas Operations Pulp Operation
  Lumber Operation, Plaster Rock, NB
- UP Paper, Manistique, Michigan
- Verso Corporation, Memphis, Tennessee
  Duluth Paper Mill, Duluth, Minnesota; acquired in NewPage merger January 2015
  Escanaba Paper Mill, Escanaba, Michigan; acquired in NewPage merger January 2015
  Luke Paper Mill, Luke, Maryland; acquired in NewPage merger January 2015, closed in May 2019
  Quinnesec Mill, Quinnesec, Michigan
  Wisconsin Rapids Paper Mill, Wisconsin Rapids, Wisconsin; acquired in NewPage merger January 2015
- Weyerhaeuser, Federal Way, Washington
- Wausau Paper
  Missota Mill, Brainerd, Minnesota (closed)
  Brokaw Paper Mill, Brokaw, Wisconsin (closed)
  Harrodsburg Paper Mill, Harrodsburg, Kentucky
  Middletown Paper Mill, Middletown, Ohio
- WestRock, Demopolis Paper Mill, Demopolis, Alabama

== Uruguay ==
- UPM-Kymmene Corporation
  - Fray Bentos Pulp Mill, Fray Bentos
  - Paso de los Toros Pulp Mill, Centenario
- Stora Enso and Celulosa Arauco y Constitución joint venture, Montes del Plata, Conchillas

== Vietnam ==
- Bãi Bằng, northwest of Hanoi
