= Eelanadu =

Sri Lankan Tamil language newspaper

- Type: Daily
- Owner: K. C. Thangaraja
- Founded: 1959
- Language: Tamil
- Headquarters: Jaffna, Sri Lanka

Eelanadu (Tamil: ஈழநாடு, romanized: īḻanāṭu) is a Tamil language newspaper. The first issues were produced in 1959, published by K. C. Thangaraja, a businessman from Jaffna, who was the Chairman of the Eastern Paper Mills Corporation in Valaichenai. The office and presses of Eelanadu were burnt in 1981 along with Burning of Jaffna Public Library and Poobalasingam Book depot during the riots.
