= Economy of Amritsar =

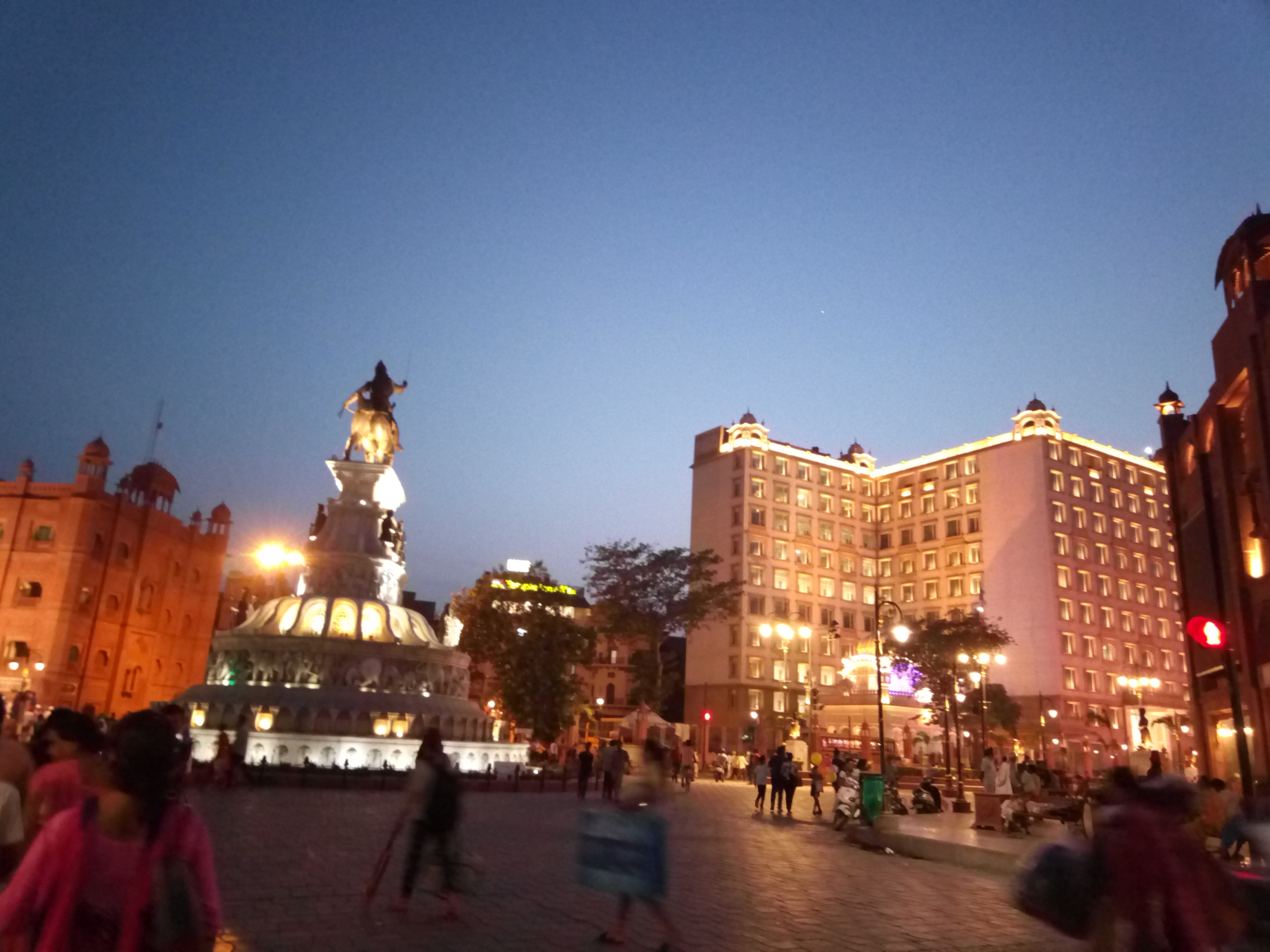
Saragarhi Sarai on the right side of Maharaja Ranjit Singh Statue in Heritage Street

Amritsar is and was the second largest city of East Punjab and United Punjab. It is a Big Commercial, Trading, Textile and Tourist hub of Punjab. There is a proposed Software Technology Park at Amritsar to make it an IT hub. This STPI centre will be functional by the next fiscal year.

== Textile Industry ==
Amritsar was famous for its Textile industry in India, but it has lost its charm to cities like Ludhiana and Ahmedabad because of Indo-Pak Border. But still, there are many textile industrial units present in the city. The city is famous for its Pashmina Shawls.

== Tourism ==
The city is known for religious, cultural, or general tourism. It is also called the Cultural Capital of Punjab, like Lahore. The holiest shrine of the Sikh community, the Golden Temple, has 350,000-400,000 visitors per day, which can increase to 1.5 million people on special occasions and festivals. It provides business to shopkeepers, transporters, and hotel owners, and employment to thousands of young people living in the city.

Other places like Durgiana Temple, Gobindgarh Fort, Wagah Border, and Bhagwan Valmiki Tirath Sthal are also famous.

== Industries ==
Apart from the Textile industry, the city is also famous for making Chess Boards and Kirpan. Khanna Paper Mill, situated in the city, is in the top 10 Paper Mills of India and the first one to use recycled paper.

== IT Park ==
Government of India has proposed a Software Technology Park in city. Which will be functional by next fiscal year. This will be a great step because Amritsar is well connected by Road, Rail and Air to all cities in India and Abroad. It is a gateway to countries like Pakistan, Afghanistan, and many others.

== Handicrafts ==
The craft of the Thatheras of Jandiala Guru in Amritsar district was listed on UNESCO's List of Intangible Cultural Heritage in 2014, and the effort to revive this craft under the umbrella of Project Virasat is among India's biggest government-sponsored craft revival programs.

== See also ==
- Amritsar rugs and carpets
