= Dayane Mello =

Brazilian naturalized Italian model and television personality

- Born: Dayane Cristina Mello; 27 February 1989 (age 37); Joinville, Brazil
- Occupations: Model; television personality
- Height: 1.77 m (5 ft 9.69 in)
- Partner(s): Nicolás Massú (2008-2012); Stefano Sala (2013-2017); Carlo Gussalli Beretta (2017-2019)
- Website: Dayane Mello

Dayane Cristina Mello (born 27 February 1989 in Joinville, Brazil) is a Brazilian naturalized Italian model and television personality.

== Biography ==
=== Model ===
Born in Joinville in the State of Santa Catarina, Brazil, she began her career as a model at the age of sixteen after being discovered by a talent scout. She later moved to Chile at the age of seventeen, after winning a beauty contest, to work in a small fashion agency; Thanks to this work, she quickly became one of the most sought-after models in Latin America.

She was under contract with the Elite Model Management agency. She starred in several covers and photo sessions, in 2011 she lent her image to an editorial in Sportweek magazine made in the Virgin Islands for the collector's edition dedicated to swimsuits. Selected for the advertising campaigns of renowned international brands such as L'Oréal and Breil, Mello has also worked for Yamamay, Intimissimi, Pollini, Angelo Marani and Colmar. He has also been in some music videos released by rappers will.i.am and Emis Killa.

In 2015, she posed for the sexy calendar of For Men magazine, which was distributed with the November issue of the previous year. In 2016, she is one of the Guess models. In the same year, she walked the catwalk during the Venice Film Festival, causing a media sensation due to the slit in the dress and the apparent absence of underwear.

In June 2021, Mello also launched DAY Dayane And You, a line of body products inspired by various cities around the world to which she is associated.

=== Television personality ===
Under a contract with the Benegas Management agency, in autumn 2014 she made her official debut on Italian television, participating as a contestant in the tenth edition of Ballando con le Stelle, broadcast on Rai 1, together with the dancer Samuel Peron; the pair took sixth place in the semifinals. In autumn 2015, Mello participated, along with mountaineer Stefano Degiorgis, in the first edition of the reality show Rai 2 Monte Bianco - Sfida verticale; she made it to the semifinal getting fourth place.

She also participated in the twelfth edition of the reality show on Canale 5 L'isola dei famosi broadcast in winter 2017. She participated, forming the Le Top couple together with the model Ema Kovač, in the eighth edition of the reality show Rai 2 Pechino Express broadcast on early 2020, placing third.

From September 14, 2020, to March 1, 2021, she was a contestant in the fifth edition of Grande Fratello VIP, organized by Alfonso Signorini, where she finished in fourth place. From September 14, 2021 to December 3, 2021 he participated a thirteenth edition of the reality show on A Fazenda, broadcast in Brazil by RecordTV, a program in which he was in tenth place.

From March 15 to May 3, 2022, together with Andrea Dianetti, she hosts Pupa Party, a web-series linked to La pupa e il secchione broadcast on the Mediaset Infinity platform.

== Personal life ==
From 2008 to 2012, she was in a relationship with former Chilean tennis player Nicolás Massú.

Mello was later romantically linked from 2013 to 2017 with the Italian model Stefano Sala; the couple had a daughter named Sofia in 2014.

From 2017 to 2019, she was in a relationship with Carlo Gussalli Beretta, heir to the Beretta family.

In February 2021, while participating in Grande Fratello VIP as a contestant, she received the news of the death of his brother Lucas, which occurred in a car accident in Brazil; however, Mello has decided to stay in the game.

== Disputes ==
In September 2021, during Mello's participation in the reality show A Fazenda 13, some videos of her went viral in which she allegedly receives, while drunk and almost unconscious, harassment by another competitor, the singer Nego do Borel, later disqualified from the show.

== Television programs ==
Year	Title	Network	Role
2014	Ballando con le Stelle 10	Rai 1	Herself / Contestant
2015	Monte Bianco – Sfida verticale	Rai 2	Herself / Contestant
2017	L'isola dei famosi 12	Canale 5	Herself / Contestant
2020	Pechino Express 8	Rai 2	Herself / Contestant
2020–2021	Grande Fratello VIP 5	Canale 5	Herself / Contestant
2021	A Fazenda 13	RecordTV	Herself / Contestant
2022	Miss Teenager Original 2022	Odeon TV	Co-conductor
2022	Alessandro Borghese – Celebrity Chef 1	TV8	Herself / Contestant

== Web TV ==
Year	Title	Platform	Role
2022	Pupa Party	Mediaset Infinity	Co-Conductor

== Other activities ==
=== Calendars ===
Year	Title
2014	For Men

=== Advertising campaigns ===
Year	Title
2011	Breil
2013	Pollini
2015	Impero Couture
2016	Yamamay

=== Music video ===
Year	Title	Artist
2013	I Wanna Trust in Santa (... a Christmas Tale)	The Crocs
2014	Blocco Boyz	Emis Killa
