= JPMS =

JPMS may refer to:

- Java Platform Module System, a distribution format for Java software elements
- John Paul Mitchell Systems, a U.S. hair care products maker
- Journal of Pakistan Medical Students, Dow University of Health Sciences
- Journal of Pioneering Medical Sciences, Dow University of Health Sciences
- Journal of Popular Music Studies, International Association for the Study of Popular Music
- Audea tegulata (Catalog of Life abbreviation: JPMS), a species of moth

== See also ==
- JPM (disambiguation), for the singular of JPMs
