= JPM =

JPM may refer to:

== People ==
- James Paul McCartney, English singer
- Jean-Baptiste Poquelin Molière, French playwright, actor and poet
- Jean-Pierre Massiera, French musician
- Joannes Paulus Magnus ("John Paul the Great"), a Latin epithet applied to Pope John Paul II
- Johann Prokop Mayer, an Austrian naturalist and botanist. He created the flower gardens at the Würzburg Residence.
- John P. McLeod, an Australian writer and broadcaster
- John Peter McArthur, a Canadian politician
- John Pierpont "JP" Morgan, banker, lobbyist, founder of the eponymous financial institution
- John Piersol McCaskey, an American politician. He served as the 23rd mayor of Lancaster, Pennsylvania from 1907 to 1911
- Joseline Peña-Melnyk, an American politician serving as the 109th Speaker of the Maryland House of Delegates since 2025
- Juan Pablo Montoya, Colombian racing car (Formula One, CART, NASCAR and others) driver

Fictional characters

- Jacqueline Payne Marone, a character from the long-running U.S. daytime soap opera The Bold and the Beautiful

== Places ==
- Jacksonville, Pensacola and Mobile Railroad (JP&M), Florida, USA
- James Pennell Mansion, a mansion that stands in the Pennellville Historic District in Brunswick, Maine, USA
- Jinhai Pulp Mill, the largest pulp mill in China, and the world's largest single-line pulp mill
- JPM Airport, a private airport located 2 miles west of Monmouth in Polk County, Oregon, USA

== Groups, organizations ==
- JPM (band), a Taiwanese Mandopop band
- Jabatan Perdana Menteri, the Malay initialism for Prime Minister's Department (Malaysia)
- Jawa Pos Multimedia, an Indonesian television network owned by Jawa Pos
- Les Avions Jean-Pierre Marie, a French aircraft design firm
- Jingle Punks Music, a music licensing and production music company based in New York
- JPMorgan Chase, whose NYSE ticker symbol is JPM

== Arts, entertainment, media ==
- Jahan Pyar Mile, a 1970 Hindi film
- Jimi Plays Monterey, a posthumous live album by Jimi Hendrix released in February 1986
- Jin Ping Mei, a 1610 Chinese naturalistic novel composed in the vernacular (baihua) during the late Ming Dynasty

== Other ==
- .jpm, a file format used by JPEG2000
- JPM Coin, a stablecoin cryptocurrency

== See also ==
- JPMS
