= For Men =

Italian men's magazine

- Categories: Men's magazine
- Frequency: Monthly
- Founded: 2003; 23 years ago
- Company: Cairo Editore
- Country: Italy
- Based in: Milan
- Language: Italian
- Website: For Men

For Men is an Italian monthly men's magazine devoted to sex, health, nutrition, hobby, sport and other men's issues published in Milan, Italy.

== History and profile ==
For Men was established in 2003. The magazine is published on a monthly basis in Milan by the publishing company Cairo Editore. On the cover has appeared celebrities like Edoardo Costa, Gonzalo Canale, Alessandro Petacchi, Stefano Tempesti, Vin Diesel, Antonio Rossi, Jury Chechi, Tom Cruise and Filippo Magnini.

== Calendars ==
Over the years, For Men has made some annual sexy calendars of female nude: each calendar is published in the month of November of the previous year compared with the RCY (referring calendar year). In some years For Men has made 2 different calendars. Taylor Mega donated to charity all her remuneration received for the 2020 For Men calendar.

RCY	Nude calendar(s) of
2004	Nina Morić
2005	Carolina Marconi – Samantha De Grenet
2006	Magda Gomes – Francesca Lodo
2007	Antonella Mosetti
2008	Nina Morić – Keyla Espinoza
2009	Sara Varone (single model calendar); Aline Domingose and Regina Fioresi
2010	Veridiana Mallmann
2011	Claudia Galanti – Nina Seničar
2012	Cecilia Capriotti
2013	Cecilia Rodríguez
2014	Raffaella Fico
2015	Dayane Mello
2016	Mariana Rodríguez
2017	Raffaella Modugno
2018	Ria Antōniou
2019	Manuela Ferrera – Fabiana Britto
2020	Taylor Mega
2021	Paola Caruso
2022	Marialuisa Jacobelli

== See also ==
- List of magazines in Italy
