= Fine Hygienic Holding =

- Native name: مجموعة فاين القابضة
- Formerly: Fine Hygienic Paper Company
- Type: Holding Company
- Industry: Productions: Wellness & Hygienic Products
- Founded: 1958 in Amman, Jordan
- Founder: Elia Nuqul
- Headquarters: Amman and Dubai
- Area served: Middle East and North Africa primary; 80 countries globally.
- Products: Hygienic Products: sterilized facial tissues, kitchen towels and toilet paper, baby and adult diapers, antiviral PPE, germ protection solutions, nutrition supplements and healthy beverages
- Brands: Fine®, Fine Guard®, Motiva®, plus others
- Services: Middle East
- Owner: Elia Nuqul
- Website: https://www.finehh.com

Fine Hygienic Holding (Arabic: الصحية القابضة مجموعة فاين, abbreviated FHH), is a wellness company with dual headquarters in Amman, Jordan and Dubai, UAE, founded in 1958 by Elia Nuqul. Its current CEO is Maurizio Patarnello. FHH specializes in the production of wellness and hygienic products, including sterilized facial tissues, kitchen towels and toilet paper, baby and adult diapers, as well as healthy beverages after obtaining a majority stake in the Arabian natural food and beverage brand, Nai Arabia Food Co, and a recent addition of personal protective equipment (PPE), germ protection solutions and nutrition supplements. FHH employs over 3,000 people of more than 30 different nationalities, operating in Jordan, Egypt, Saudi Arabia, the UAE, and serves over 80 markets across the Middle East, Africa, Europe, Asia, and the United States.

== History ==
=== Origin ===
In 1952 Elia Nuqul established Nuqul Brothers Company, a modest trade and import business for food and consumer goods. Nuqul went on to expand his original business into the production of hygienic paper products and founded Fine Hygienic Holding (formerly known as Fine Hygienic Paper Company) in 1958.

=== Expansion ===
After its beginning in Jordan, the company opened a converting factory in Saudi Arabia, then Egypt, then the UAE, and in 1991 Fine Hygienic Holding opened its first paper mill in Egypt. Following this expansion, the company began to expand beyond the region to enter markets on an international scale in Europe, Asia and Africa.

In 2015, Standard Chartered Private Equity acquired a minority stake in FHH, investing US$175 Million. Then, in 2019, the long-standing senior leadership of Standard Chartered Private Equity formed a company called Affirma Capital which now owns that stake of FHH.

In 2019, FHH further expanded into the wellness industry, acquiring a major stake, in the Arabian natural food and beverage brand, Nai Arabia Food Co. In early 2020, FHH responded to the COVID-19 pandemic by launching the Fine Guard line of long-term germ protection products. First out was a reusable antiviral mask, later expanded to a range of masks, including for sports and children, as well as gloves, hand sanitizers, surface disinfectants, and fabric sprays.

== Operations ==
FHH operates a total of 5 full-scale paper mills in Jordan, Egypt, and the UAE, with a total annual production of around 210,000 tons, as well as 5 converting factories in Jordan, Egypt, Morocco, Saudi Arabia and the UAE.

FHH currently has ten brands, under which a range of wellness and hygienic goods are produced, including Fine, Fine Guard, and Motiva.

== Awards ==
In 2019, FHH received three of the Global Gender Diversity and Leadership Excellence Awards at the annual Leonie Awards.

In 2019, At the GCC Best Employer Brand Awards FHH was awarded Best Employer Brand and the award for promoting health in the Workplace. In that same year, FHH received the Fitbit Award for Physical Activity from Daman Corporate Health and Wellness.

FHH was the recipient of the Aon Hewitt Award in 2009 and 2014, classifying it among the top 15 employers in the Middle East.

== Environmental Record and Sustainability ==
Fine Hygienic Holding is an active participant and signatory to the United Nations Global Compact.

== Corporate social responsibility ==
In 2007, FHH launched its flagship CSR program, Khair Al Koura, which promotes sustainable socioeconomic development in Al-Kourah District of Jordan's Irbid Governorate. It is the first public – private partnership for a sustainable development program in Jordan and focuses on empowering women and providing them with a sustainable income.

During the COVID-19 epidemic FHH established a relief fund which exceeded $2M USD.

In 2021, FHH launched its new CSR initiative Fine Academy, which trains students in sector-relevant areas where there is a recognized skills-gap, including in supply chain management.

FHH supports programmes for women's empowerment, education, health and well-being, independently and in cooperation with governments and civil society organizations in the countries where it operates.
