= Graham Paper Company =

American paper company

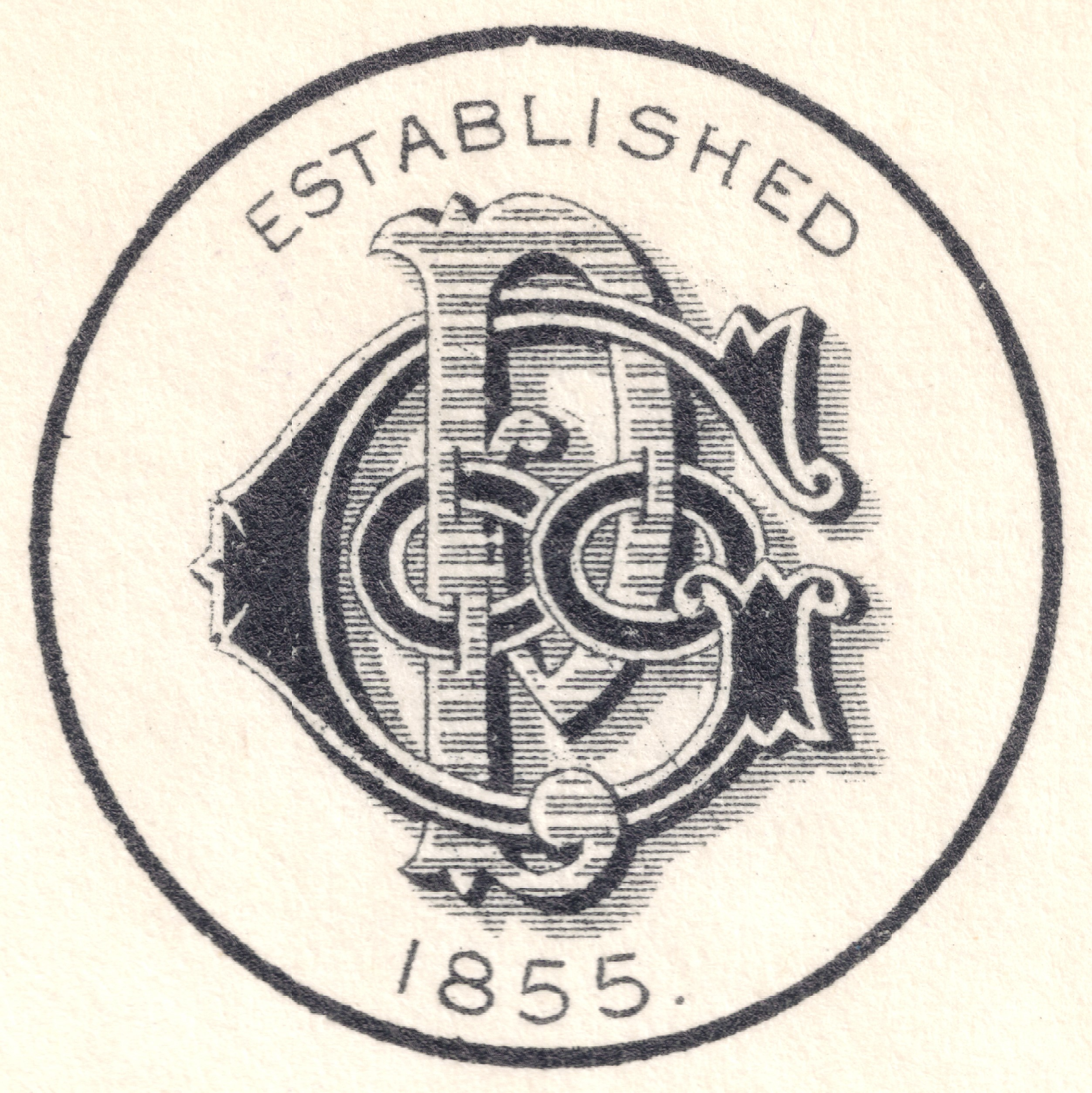

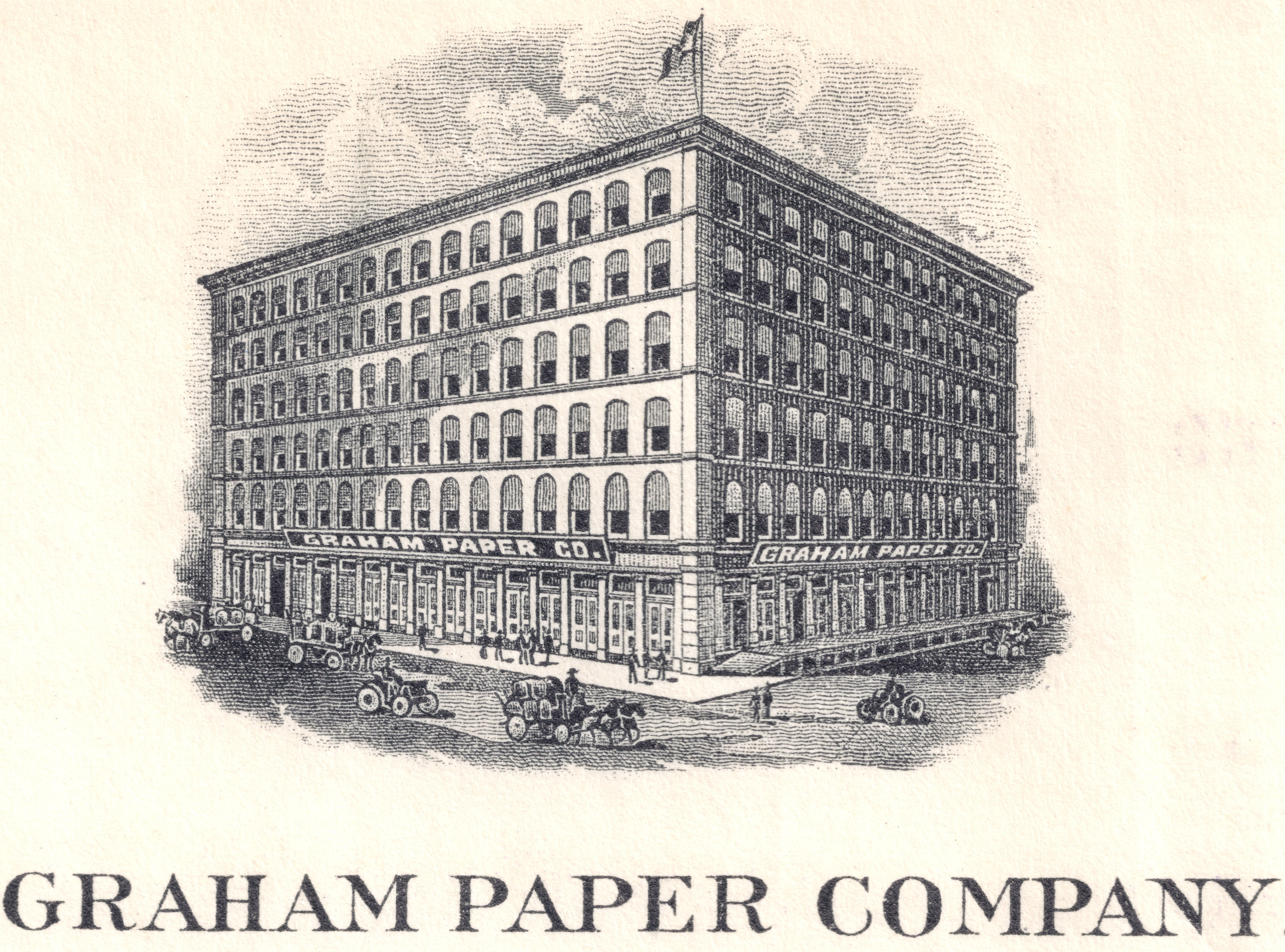
- Formerly: H. B. Graham and Brothers
- Industry: Manufacturing
- Genre: Paper
- Founded: 1855 in St. Louis, Missouri, U.S.
- Founder: Henry Brown Graham
- Defunct: November 10, 1977
- Fate: Acquired
- Successor: Star Industries, Inc. (1970–1977); Jim Walter Paper, Inc. (1977-1989); Butler Paper Company (1989-1996); Unisource Worldwide (1996-present)
- Headquarters: 1014 Spruce Street, St. Louis, Missouri, U.S.
- Number of locations: 27 (1970)
- Key people: Benjamin Graham (President); H. M. French (President); J. P. Tirrill (President); Martin J. Collins (President); Harry W. Henry, Sr. (President); J. P. Wilson (President); Harry W. Henry, Jr. (President)
- Products: Books, newspapers, flat and label papers, binders, boards, twines
- Revenue: $63,500,000 (1969)
- Net income: $684,000 (1969)
- Total equity: $9,685,639 (1970)

Graham Paper Company, formerly known as H. B. Graham and Brothers and originally known as H. B. Graham, was a privately owned American printer, manufacturer, and distributor of paper products. It is the oldest paper company in the United States west of the Mississippi River. By the 1960s, Graham Paper was the largest wholesaler of paper in the United States. At its height, the company had 27 distribution centers throughout the country, including in every major city. The company sold stationery, paperboard, newsprint sheets, spools of twine, machine-finished coated papers, wood-free uncoated papers, coated fine papers, and special fine papers. Major clients included national and regional newspaper companies, book publishers, boards of education, and state governments.

== History ==
Graham Paper was founded in 1855 by Henry Brown Graham. A Cincinnati native, Graham moved to St. Louis where he became a pioneering industrialist in printing and paper manufacturing. He is credited with constructing the first paper mills west of the Mississippi River. The company was founded during the beginning stages of the Second Industrial Revolution. In the 1840s, Charles Fenerty in Nova Scotia and Friedrich Gottlob Keller in Saxony, both invented a successful machine which extracted the fibres from wood, as well as rags, in order to generate paper. This revolution in technology introduced a new era for paper making and was a core element of the Second Industrial Revolution, in general. It was within this historical context, of the fast-growing demand and technological change in paper making, that led Henry Graham to found his company in St. Louis, as a means of entering this new market.

In 1855, St. Louis was the most populated city west of the Mississippi River and the second largest port city, by aggregate tonnage, in the United States. With its strategic location along the major steamboat transportation routes, as well as its central proximity to the city's waterfront lumberyards, St. Louis was geographically and economically primed to become a major paper producing center during the Second Industrial Revolution. Indeed, these conditions proved to be conducive to Graham Paper's financial success, as the company grew rapidly following the Civil War era. Among the first buildings Henry Graham had built included a rag warehouse, for the storage of raw materials in the production of cotton paper. The company located its facilities in the waterfront district of St. Louis for easy access to river shipping. There were also a number of lumberyards located in the waterfront district during this era.

Graham Paper was incorporated in August 1880. In 1897, the company experienced a major financial setback with the loss of large stock inventory, due to a fire that destroyed half of the Security warehouse in St. Paul, Minnesota. In the late 1890s, the company decided to relocate from the waterfront district to the Cupples block, a state-of-the-art industrial development project being constructed in the Mill Creek Valley area of St. Louis. According to geographer Virginia Henry, many business elite considered the move ill-advised, as it was commonly believed that Graham Paper was moving too far from its business contacts in the downtown area. She notes, however, that "the move proved to be a wise one for not long afterward many of the printers in the old town began moving out and locating further west." Additionally, she notes:

Among the numerous economies furnished to the tenants in the Cupples Station Blocks were those of elimination of delay and expense of drayage, saving of waste and damage to goods in handling, and transaction of business entirely under cover, especially advantageous during inclement weather. Also, they were able to make use of the practice of less-than-carload lots--the assembling of less-than-carload shipments into carloads.

In 1901, Graham Paper bought out one of its most successful rivals, the Brown & Clark Company, based in St. Louis. The company had been founded by former Graham Paper employees.

=== Successors ===
In 1970, Graham Paper was bought out by the Kansas City Star Company. As part of the agreement, Graham Paper was merged with Flambeau Paper, a wholly owned subsidiary of Kansas City Star. The merger was completed on July 12, 1971, at which time the new parent company became known as Star Industries, Incorporated. In 1977, Graham Paper was sold to Jim Walter Paper, Inc., a subsidiary of Jim Walter Corporation of Jacksonville, Florida. At this time, the Graham Paper name ceased to exist, although Harry W. Henry II and other senior management of the company continued unchanged after the acquisition. Henry continued on until 1978, becoming the last president of Graham Paper Company. In 1989, Jim Walter Paper was sold to Butler Paper Company, a subsidiary of Alco Standard. In 1996, Alco split into two companies based on Alco's two major divisions: Ikon and Unisource. Ikon Office Solutions became an office copier, whereas Unisource Worldwide became a paper sales and distribution company. The latter company is the most recent successor to Graham Paper and is likewise headquartered in St. Louis.

== Facilities ==
In 1900, under the management of Benjamin Graham, the Graham Paper Company built a new headquarters in downtown St. Louis at the corner of 11th and Spruce Streets. The seven-story brick building was one of twenty built between 1897 and 1917 that became known as the Cupples Station Historic District. In 1988, the National Park Service approved the addition of the Cupples Station Warehouse District to the National Register of Historic Places. At the time, only 8 of the original 20 structures remained. In 2013, the former headquarters of the Graham Paper Company was unregistered from the National Register of Historic Places and subsequently destroyed by a demolition crew. The destruction of the Graham Paper building, also known as Cupples 7, generated controversy in St. Louis. As a result of the loss of the historic building, a group of city leaders held a series of meetings in 2013 to discuss reforms to historic building preservation in St. Louis, in the hope that another "Graham Paper Company" would not occur in a similar loss to the city's historic architecture.

In 1957, under the management of Harry W. Henry, the company finished construction of a 40,000 square foot manufacturing facility in St. Louis. The single floor concrete, brick, and steel plant was constructed to manufacture paper for the national chain of 25 paper distributors. The facility was necessary in order to deal with the expansion of market share and was thus built with approximately 30,000 square feet of storage space and three separate rail lines. The historic Spruce Street headquarters continued on as the central office for the company.

== Presidents ==
- Henry Graham (1855–1885)
- Benjamin B. Graham (1885–1904)
- H. M. French (1904–1912)
- Jacob Porter Tirrill (1912–1926)
- Colonel Martin J. Collins (1926–1942)
- Harry W. Henry, Senior (1942–1958)
- Jim P. Wilson (1958–1975)
- Harry W. Henry, Junior (1975–1977)

== See also ==
- Cotton paper
- Paper mill
- List of paper mills
- Kansas City Star
- Unisource Worldwide
