= Krika =

- Location within Skåne Location within Sweden
- Coordinates: 56°06′N 13°08′E
- Country: Sweden
- Province: Skåne
- County: Skåne County
- Municipality: Klippan Municipality

Area
  - Total: 0.36 km^{2} (0.14 sq mi)

Population (2005-12-31)
  - Total: 208
  - Density: 576/km^{2} (1,490/sq mi)
- Time zone: UTC+1 (CET)
  - Summer (DST): UTC+2 (CEST)

Krika is a village situated in Klippan Municipality, Skåne County, Sweden with 208 inhabitants in 2005.
