= Steam mill =

Steam-powered mechanism

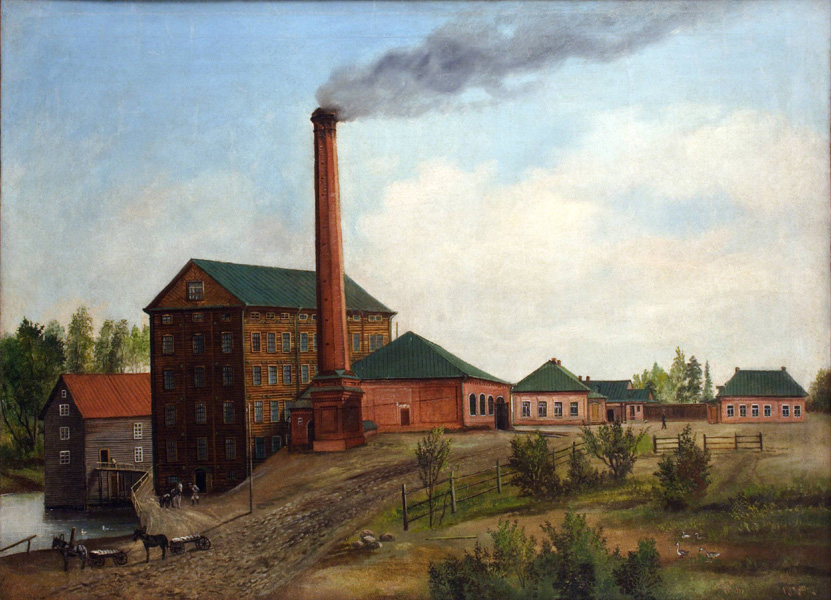
A type of steam mill in Yaroslavl, Russia, with a body of water and a high chimney

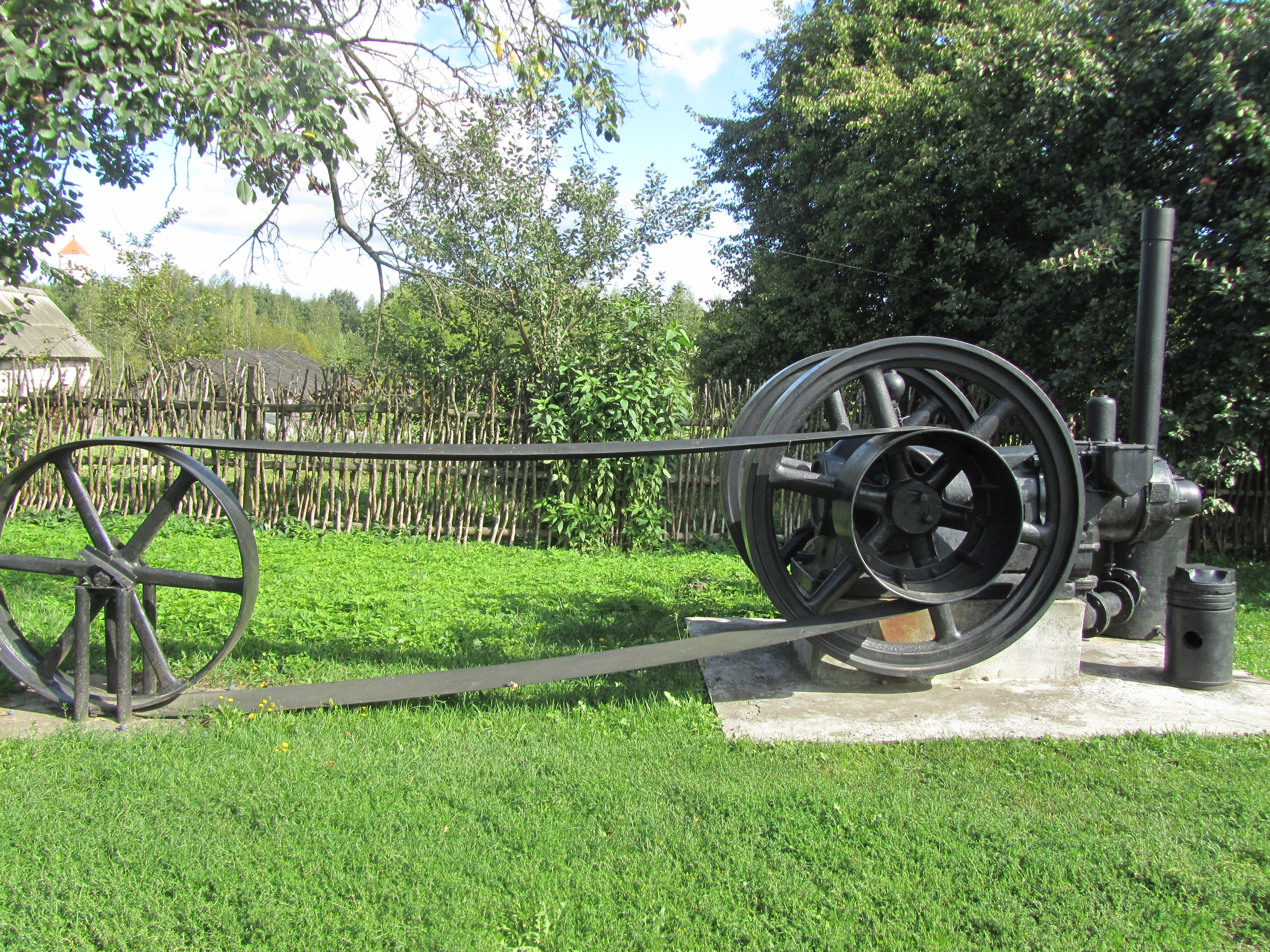
Steam engine that used to be a part of a steam mill. Zaslawye, Belarus

A steam mill is a type of grinding mill using a stationary steam engine to power its mechanism.

- Albion Flour Mills, first steam mill in London from around 1790
- Aurora Steam Grist Mill, a historic grist mill located in Aurora, Cayuga County, New York, United States
- Cincinnati Steam Paper Mill, the first steam-powered mill in Cincinnati, Ohio, United States
- Sutherland Steam Mill Museum, a restored steam woodworking mill from the 1890s located in Denmark, Nova Scotia, Canada
