= Varone =

Varone is a surname. Notable people with the surname include:

- Doug Varone, American dancer and cinematographer
- Phil Varone (born 1967), American rock drummer, music producer and songwriter
- Phil Varone (ice hockey) (born 1990), Canadian ice hockey player
- Sara Varone (born 1972), Italian television presenter
- Toni Varone, Canadian senator
