= Binda Group =

Italian watch, jewellery, leather accessories corporate group

- Company type: Watch Maker
- Industry: Watch and jewelry manufacturing
- Founded: 1906
- Headquarters: Milan, Italy
- Area served: Worldwide
- Key people: Gianni Pieraccioni, Managing Director; Marcello Binda, Binda co-CEO; Simone Binda, Binda co-CEO; Jeff Gregg, Geneva CEO
- Products: Wristwatches, jewellery and leather accessories
- Revenue: ▲€297 million (2007)
- Number of employees: 3200
- Website: www.bindagroup.com

The Binda Group is an Italian watch, jewellery, leather accessories corporate group founded by Innocente Binda in 1906, headquartered in Milan and headed by brothers Marcello and Simone Binda, grandsons of the founder.

== Organization ==
The company owns subsidiaries in eight countries. Binda's three main business units are watches, jewellery and leather. It produces and distributes its own brands, including several companies. The group also licences watch and jewellery brands from Dolce & Gabbana with brands D&G Time and D&G Jewels, from Moschino with brands Moschino CheapAndChic and Love Moschino, from Ducati Corse and from Nike. In 1997, Binda acquired the distribution rights to Seiko and Lorus for the Italian market.

Binda operates in more than 70 markets with approximately 400 employees worldwide, and ended 2007 with consolidated revenues of €297 million and sales of approximately 5 million pieces. Its watches include those made in the Far East, retailing under $100 (75 euros), Swiss-made ones, averaging about $1,400 (1,000 euros), and complicated tourbillon watches, retailing above $184,000 (130,000 euros). Breil Milano’s two brand ambassadors are Oscar-winning actress Charlize Theron and film actor Edward Norton.

== Subsidiaries ==
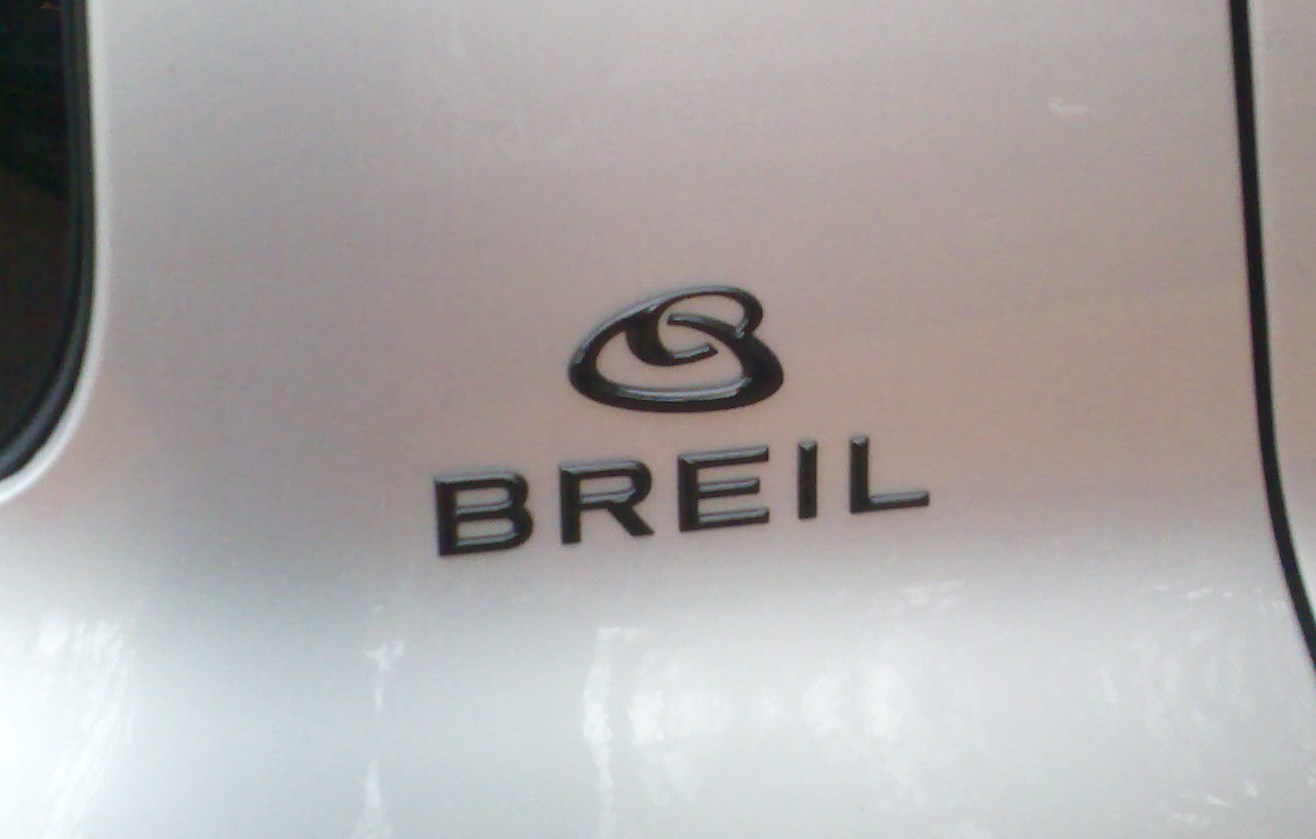
The Breil Milano logo apply on a special edition of Renault Modus

The following companies are wholly owned subsidiaries of Binda Group:

- Breil (company),
- Vetta (company),
- Wyler Genève,
- Hip Hop (company),
- Chronotech,
- Freestyle California,
- Think Big Jewels,
- Feelo.
