= Mitsubishi Paper Mills =

Japanese company, part of the Mitsubishi group

Mitsubishi Paper Mills Limited 三菱製紙株式会社
- Company type: Subsidiary KK
- Traded as: TYO: 3864
- Industry: Pulp and paper
- Founded: April 1, 1898
- Headquarters: Sumida, Tokyo, Japan
- Key people: Kunio Suzuki (President)
- Number of employees: 2,832 (2024)
- Parent: Oji Holdings Corporation (32.89%)
- Website: mitsubishi-paper.com (en)

Mitsubishi Paper Mills Limited (三菱製紙株式会社, Mitsubishi Seishi Kabushiki-kaisha) (TYO: 3864) is a Japanese company based in Sumida, Tokyo. It is part of the Mitsubishi and Oji Paper group.
