= Catawba paper mill =

Paper factory in Catawba, South Carolina

- Location within South Carolina
- Built: 1959
- Location: 5300 Cureton Ferry Rd, Catawba, SC 29704; Catawba, York County, South Carolina
- Coordinates: 34.84°N 80.89°W
- Industry: Pulp and paper
- Products: Pulp
- Employees: 450
- Buildings: 94,000 square feet
- Owners: Schwarz Partners and New Indy LLC (a subsidiary of Kraft Group)
- Website: newindycatawba.com

Catawba paper mill is a paper factory in Catawba, South Carolina part owned by a subsidiary of Kraft Group.

The mill's owners were fined $1.1 million by the Environmental Protection Agency in response to odours emitted from the plant.

== Description ==
Catawba paper mill is a paper factory located on a 1,800-acre site in Catawba, York County, South Carolina located approximately 5,000 feet from the Catawba River upstream of Chester, South Carolina.

It is owned by Kraft Group subsidiary New Indy LLC, sometimes known as New Indy Containerboard.

Wastewater from the mill flows through the mill's Aeration Stabilization Basin and an Equalization Basin, both designed to reduce the emission of hydrogen sulfide from the mill.

The site 94,000 square foot factory employs 450 people.

== History ==
The mill was built in 1959. Prior to New Indy buying the mill, it was owned by Bowater. Schwarz Partners and New Indy purchased the site from (Bowater's successor) Resolute Forest Products in 2019 and switched activities away from bleached paper towards unbleached pulp.

In 2020, the mill's owners were the subject of litigation by residents suing for damages they linked to odors from the plant. Local residents claimed that the mill's emission caused headaches, nose bleeds, and nausea. By 2021, over 30,000 public complaints had been made about the smells from the mill.

The Environmental Protection Agency fined the owners $1.1 million relating to emissions of fumes from the plant. In 2022, mill manager Tony Hobson admitted that "We let the community down from an overall standpoint ...We started up. We ran into some issues at start-up and that ended up cascading into more than what we had hoped for." In 2022, dioxins were identified in four 1960s-built waste sludge lagoons at the mill. An engineering report by S&ME Inc states that leaks from the lagoons seep into the adjacent river's embankment and that a repair was necessary. Owners acknowledge the presence of dioxins in the lagoons, noting that this is a legacy of activities of prior owners.

The mill is featured in the 2015 book The Slain Wood: Papermaking and Its Environmental Consequences in the American South written by UCLA law professor William Boyd In the book, Boyd advocates for the mechanical removal of the sludge from the lagoons. and encouraged the site's current owners to solve the problems they inherited with their purchase of the mill.

== See also ==
- List of paper mills
- Old Town paper mill
