= Klippan Municipality =

Klippan Municipality Klippans kommun
- Municipality
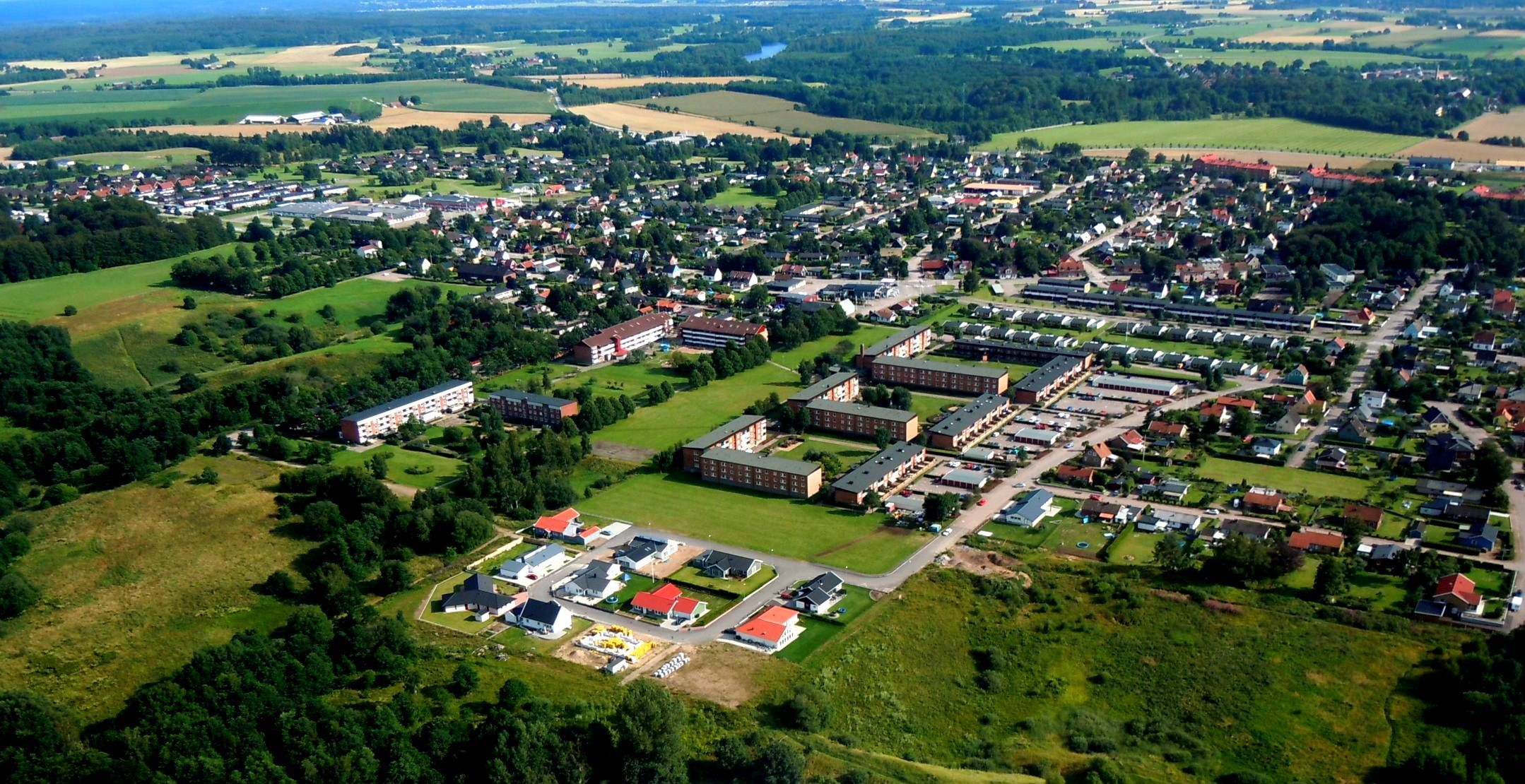

- Flag Coat of arms

- Coordinates: 56°08′N 13°08′E
- Country: Sweden
- County: Skåne County
- Seat: Klippan

Area
  - Total: 379.41 km^{2} (146.49 sq mi)
  - Land: 374.32 km^{2} (144.53 sq mi)
  - Water: 5.09 km^{2} (1.97 sq mi)
- Area as of 1 January 2014.

Population (30 June 2025)
  - Total: 17,670
  - Density: 47.21/km^{2} (122.3/sq mi)
- Time zone: UTC+1 (CET)
  - Summer (DST): UTC+2 (CEST)
- ISO 3166 code: SE
- Province: Scania
- Municipal code: 1276
- Website: www.klippan.se

Klippan Municipality (Swedish: Klippans kommun) is a municipality in Skåne County in southern Sweden. Its seat is located in the town of Klippan.

The municipality was created in 1974 through the amalgamation of the market town Klippan (itself instituted in 1945) with the rural municipality of Riseberga and part of Östra Ljungby.

Söderåsen National Park is partly situated within the municipality.

== Localities ==
There were five localities in the municipality in 2018.

| Locality | Population |
|---|---|
| Klippan | 8,819 |
| Ljungbyhed | 2,168 |
| Östra Ljungby | 1,819 |
| Klippans bruk | 319 |
| Krika | 196 |

== Demographics ==
This is a demographic table based on Klippan Municipality's electoral districts in the 2022 Swedish general election sourced from SVT's election platform, in turn taken from SCB official statistics.

In total there were 17,742 residents, including 12,988 Swedish citizens of voting age. 33.6% voted for the left coalition and 64.7% for the right coalition. Indicators are in percentage points except population totals and income.

| Location | Residents | Citizen adults | Left vote | Right vote | Employed | Swedish parents | Foreign heritage | Income SEK | Degree |
| Location | | | % | % | | | | | |
|---|---|---|---|---|---|---|---|---|---|
| Klippan N-Gråmanstorp | 1,708 | 1,207 | 37.5 | 60.8 | 74 | 66 | 34 | 20,729 | 27 |
| Klippan NÖ-Solslätt | 1,680 | 1,202 | 37.0 | 62.0 | 78 | 73 | 27 | 23,484 | 29 |
| Klippan SÖ-Nyslätt | 2,266 | 1,667 | 35.9 | 61.8 | 71 | 73 | 27 | 20,850 | 23 |
| Klippan V | 2,107 | 1,496 | 37.4 | 60.5 | 70 | 64 | 36 | 19,950 | 26 |
| Krika-Bonnarp | 1,363 | 997 | 28.5 | 70.9 | 83 | 81 | 19 | 27,632 | 27 |
| Ljungbyhed N | 1,440 | 1,078 | 32.7 | 66.2 | 70 | 79 | 21 | 20,946 | 27 |
| Ljungbyhed S | 1,268 | 972 | 32.3 | 66.5 | 76 | 85 | 15 | 21,989 | 32 |
| Riseberga-Färingtofta | 1,258 | 986 | 34.1 | 64.6 | 77 | 84 | 16 | 23,404 | 37 |
| Stidsvig | 995 | 696 | 32.6 | 65.4 | 80 | 79 | 21 | 24,801 | 27 |
| Storäng-Vedby | 2,101 | 1,581 | 30.9 | 67.5 | 86 | 86 | 14 | 26,815 | 30 |
| Östra Ljungby | 1,556 | 1,106 | 29.0 | 69.0 | 78 | 79 | 21 | 23,065 | 23 |
Source: SVT

== Buildings ==
The Church of St. Peter, designed by Sigurd Lewerentz, was completed in 1966.
