= Breil (company) =

Italian luxury brand

Coordinates: 45.4765165°N 9.1699483°E

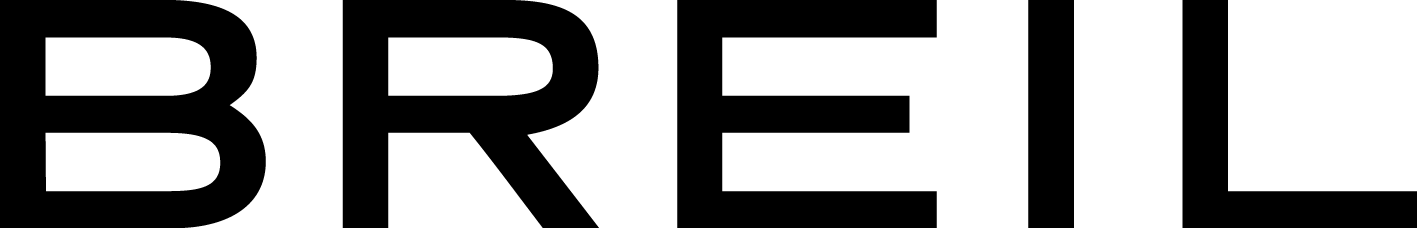
- Type: Public
- Industry: Watch manufacturing and jewelry
- Founded: 1939
- Founder: Innocente Binda
- Headquarters: Milan, Italy
- Area served: Worldwide
- Products: Wristwatches, jewels, eyewear, fragrances, leather accessories
- Services: Timing systems
- Revenue: €120 million
- Website: Breil.com

Breil is an Italian luxury company of Binda Group. Its products include watches, jewels, eyewear, fragrances, and leather accessories.

== History ==
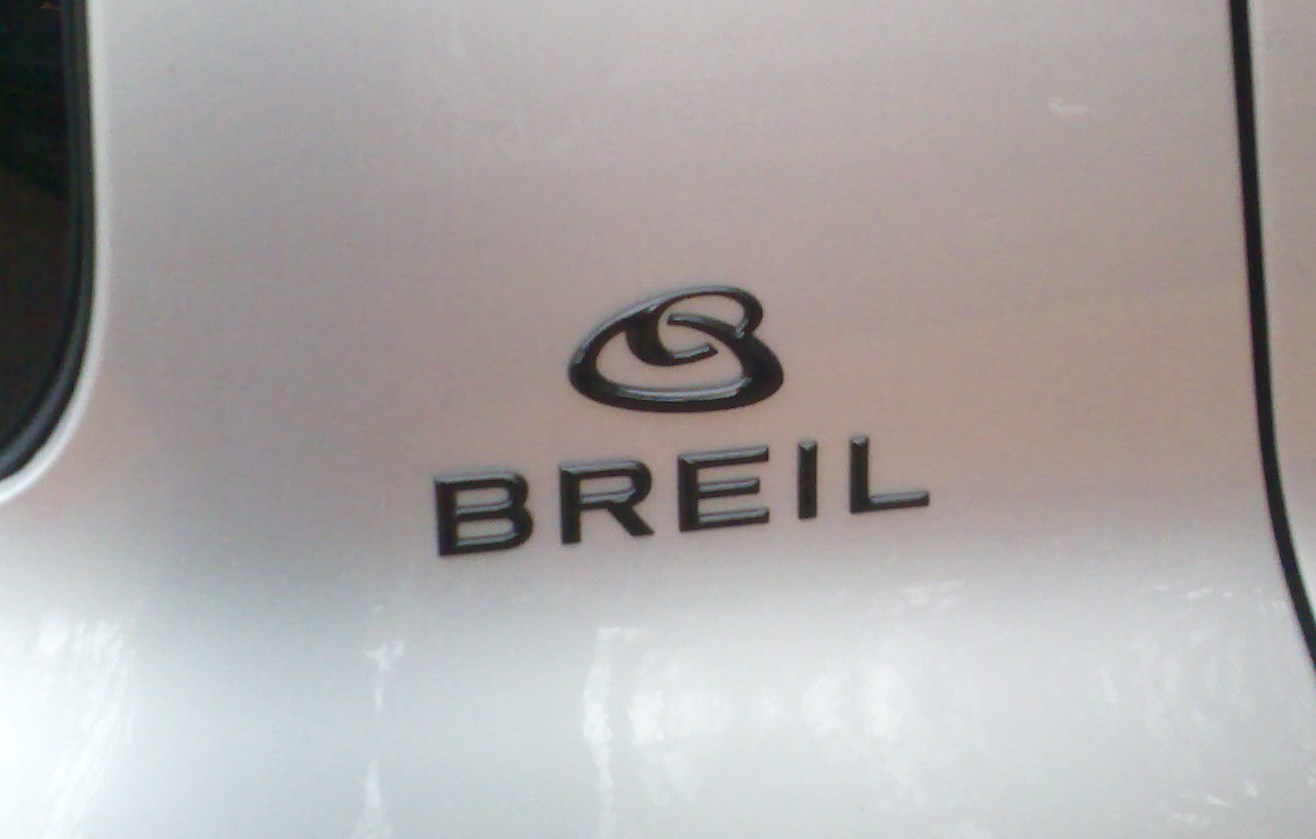
The Breil Milano logo apply on a special edition of Renault Modus

This brand started in Milan in 1939, named after a Swiss municipality. In 1942, the first Breil wristwatch was introduced. Initially, the company made a line of alarm clocks and a few years later, wristwatches too. In 1956, the producer Innocente Binda made an unusual promotional action: he dropped some watches from his production from the Eiffel Tower in Paris to show that after a flight of 302 meters, his watches proved to have been fully functional.

== Operations ==
In commercials of the early 1990s, the company created a line of wristwatch models, typically used by men, that were marketed to women; Monica Bellucci, Shana (singer), Carré Otis, Charlize Theron, Jessica Alba, Laura Chiatti were the chosen models for this campaign.

In 2001, Breil launched steel jewelry. In 2009, the company made the Bloom collection, the first range of jewels that can be worn together. In 2012, Breil launched the Infinity collection.

== Products ==
Lines of watches are several and with various names in related countries; among these lines or collections, some famous are: Beaubourg in 1979, Breil Tribe in 1996, Breil Milano in 2001, Breil Manta in 2010, Infinity in 2012, Gent in 2014. Jewels made are rings, bracelets, necklaces, earrings, and accessories. In 2006, started production of fragrances. In 2007, started production of frames for eyeglasses.

== See also ==
- Binda Group
