= Glatfelter =

Manufacturing company

- Company type: Public
- Traded as: NYSE: GLT
- Industry: Manufacturing
- Founded: 1864
- Headquarters: Charlotte, North Carolina, U.S.
- Key people: Thomas Fahnemann (CEO)
- Revenue: ▲US$1.1 Billion (FY 2020)
- Operating income: ▲US$49.2 Million (FY 2020)
- Net income: ▲US$21.3 Million (FY 2020)
- Total assets: ▲US$1.3 Billion (FY 2020)
- Total equity: ▲US$557.9 Million (FY 2020)
- Number of employees: 3,250

Glatfelter was a global manufacturer of engineered solutions. It merged with Berry Global’s Health, Hygiene and Specialties Global Nonwovens and Films business (the “HHNF Business”), to form Magnera Corporation (NYSE: MAGN), the largest nonwovens company in the world. Magnera provides a broad platform of solutions for the specialty materials industry.

The company's products are found in tea and single-serve coffee filtration, personal hygiene and packaging products as well as home improvement and industrial applications. Headquartered in Charlotte, North Carolina, the company's annualized net sales approximate $1 billion with customers in over 100 countries and approximately 2,560 employees worldwide. Operations include twelve manufacturing facilities located in the United States, Canada, Germany, France, the United Kingdom, and the Philippines.

The company was started by Philip Henry Glatfelter in 1864 in Spring Grove, Pennsylvania. Glatfelter's annual revenues are approximately $1.1 Billion annually, and its common stock is traded on the New York Stock Exchange under the ticker symbol GLT. Glatfelter and its subsidiaries employ approximately 3,250 people worldwide.

== History ==
- As early as 1880, Glatfelter led the industry with the installation of the world's largest paper machine.
- Glatfelter switched to making paper using wood fiber instead of rags in the 1880s.
- In 1934, Glatfelter began its forestry management initiative, encouraging farmers to plant more trees and prevent soil erosion.
- In 1947, Glatfelter launched a tree farm managed for the growing of sustainable forest crops in Pennsylvania and Maryland.
- Glatfelter's previous president and CEO, George Henry Glatfelter II, is the great-great grandson of the founder, Philip Henry Glatfelter (1837–1907), who also founded York Ice Company, which became York Heating and Air Conditioning.
- Glatfelter's work with sustainable tea packaging was highlighted in the September 2009 issue of the Tea & Coffee Trade Journal.
- In August 2018, Glatfelter announced an agreement to sell its Specialty Papers division to private investment firm Lindsay Goldberg for $360 million, with the sale to close before 2019. This formed a new privately held company, Pixelle Specialty Solutions.
- In February 2020, Glatfelter announced it would relocate its corporate headquarters from York, Pennsylvania, to Charlotte, North Carolina later in the year.
- In June 2021, Glatfelter acquired the Mount Holly and Memphis sites. The transaction included Georgia-Pacific’s Mount Holly, North Carolina airlaid manufacturing operation and an R&D development in Memphis Tennessee. The Mount Holly site produces airlaid products focused on table top materials.
- In October 2021, Glatfelter acquired Jacob Holm. Glatfelter acquired four additional manufacturing sites and six sales offices located in the Americas, Europe, and Asia, and approximately 760 employees world-wide.
- August 25, 2022, Glatfelter announced Thomas Fahnemann has been appointed to the role of president and chief executive officer. He replaced chairman and chief executive officer, Dante C. Parrini, who left the company following a 25-year career. The Board also appointed Kevin Fogarty, independent Glatfelter board director and chairman of the nominating and corporate governance committee, to the role of non-executive chairman.
- February 14, 2024, US packaging producer Berry Global Group signed a definitive agreement with fellow US Glatfelter Corporation on 7 February for the spin-off and merger of the majority of Berry’s Health, Hygiene ad Specialties segment, including nonwovens and films ("HHNF”), with Glatfelter. The merger reportedly aims to create a leading, publicly traded company in the specialty materials industry.
- November 4, 2024, Glatfelter merged with Berry Global’s Health, Hygiene and Specialties Global Nonwovens and Films business (the “HHNF Business”), forming Magnera Corporation.

== Environmental concerns ==
In 2016, Glatfelter's Spring Grove paper mill was listed just outside the top 1% of toxic air pollution sources in the United States, according to the U.S. Environmental Protection Agency, ranking 160 out of 15,461 sites evaluated. The Pennsylvania Department of Environmental Protection cited the company for two significant violations since 2013, and the company has been federally cited for significant violations of the Clean Air Act. In response to these violations and subsequent press coverage, a Glatfelter representative stated to the York Daily Record that the company maintains a commitment to improving its environmental performance. Glatfelter sold the Spring Grove mill in 2018.

== Products ==
- Airlaid materials
- Composite fibers
- Composite laminates
- Engineered products
- Food and beverage papers
- Home improvement and industrial applications
- Metallized films and papers
- Personal hygiene materials
- Packaging products
- Technical specialties
