= Oji Paper Company =

Japanese manufacturer

Coordinates: 35°40′17″N 139°46′0″E

Oji Holdings Corporation

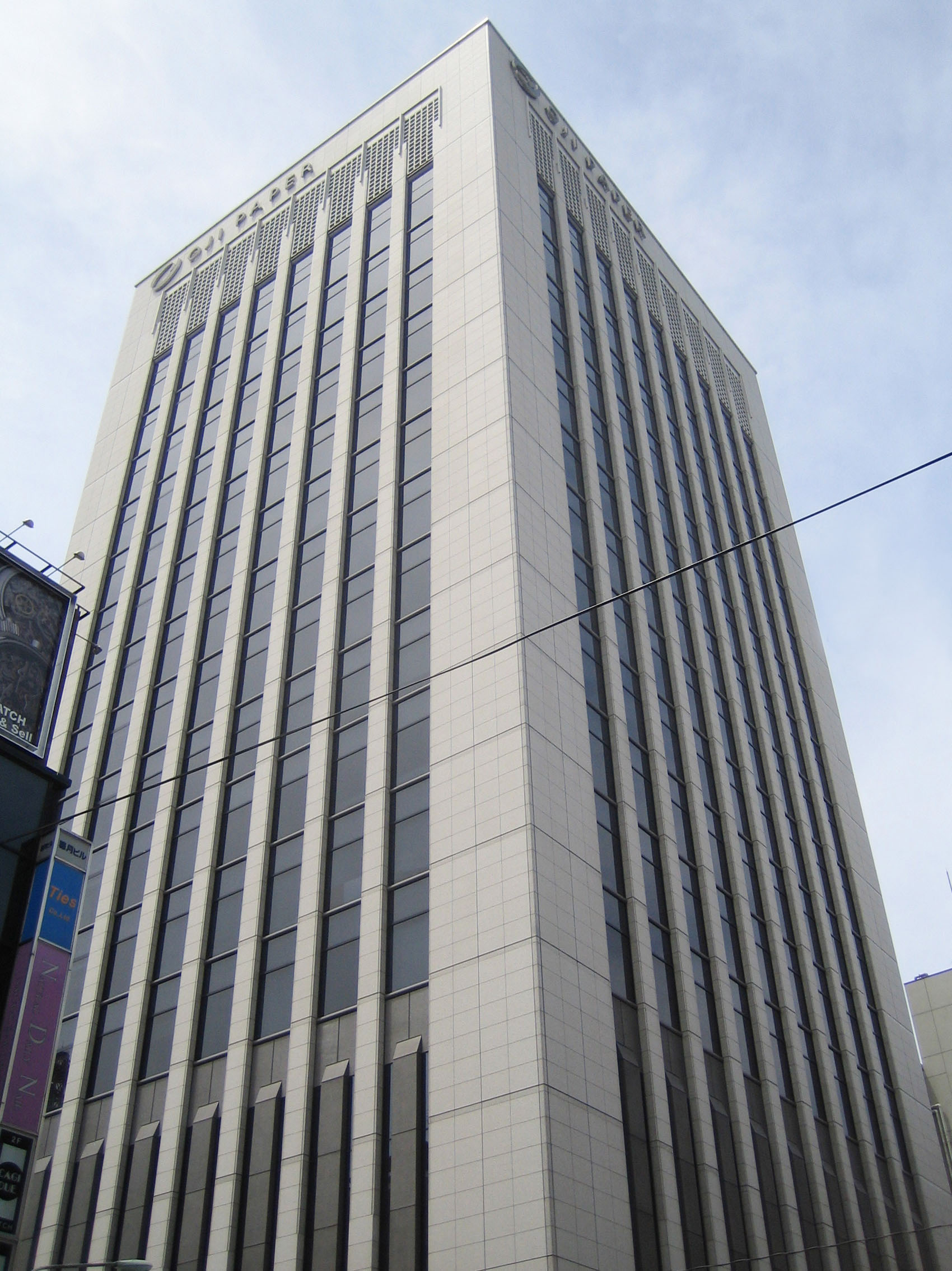
- Native name: 王子ホールディングス株式会社
- Romanized name: Ōji Hōrudingusu Kabushiki-gaisha
- Formerly: Tomakomai Paper Co., Ltd. (1949-1952); Oji Paper Industries Co., Ltd. (1952-1960); Oji Paper Co., Ltd. (1960-1993); New Oji Paper Co., Ltd. (1993-1996); Oji Paper Co., Ltd. (1996-2012)
- Type: Public (K.K)
- Traded as: TYO: 3861; Nikkei 225 Component
- Industry: Pulp and Paper
- Founded: February 12, 1873; 153 years ago (as Shoshi Keisha); August 1, 1949; 77 years ago (as Tomakomai Paper)
- Founder: Ei-ichi Shibusawa
- Headquarters: 7-5, Ginza 4-chome, Chūō, Tokyo, Japan
- Key people: Kiyotaka Shindo, (CEO and President)
- Products: Paper; Containerboard; Household paper products; Specialty papers; Lumber and pulp; Chemicals; Functional films; Adhesive products; Renewable energy
- Revenue: ▲$ 13.20 billion USD (FY 2012) (¥ 1,241 billion JPY) (FY 2012)
- Net income: ▲$ 272.202 million USD (FY 2012) (¥ 25.6 billion JPY) (FY 2012)
- Number of employees: ▲27,360 (consolidated) (as of 31 March 2013)
- Subsidiaries: 156 (86 in Japan and 70 overseas)
- Website: ojiholdings.co.jp

Oji Paper Co., Ltd.
- Native name: 王子製紙株式会社
- Romanized name: Ōji Seishi Kabushiki-gaisha
- Type: Subsidiary
- Industry: Pulp and paper
- Founded: October 1, 2012; 13 years ago
- Headquarters: 7-5, Ginza 4-chome, Chūō, Tokyo, Japan
- Key people: Takao Funada (president and CEO)
- Website: ojipaper.co.jp

Oji Holdings Corporation (王子ホールディングス株式会社, Ōji Hōrudingusu Kabushiki-gaisha) is a Japanese manufacturer of paper products. In 2012, the company was the third-largest company in the global forest, paper, and packaging industry. Its stock is listed on the Tokyo Stock Exchange and is a constituent of the Nikkei 225 stock index.

In 2012, Oji Paper restructured as a holding company, spinning off its paper division into a separate, wholly owned subsidiary under the original Oji Paper name.

== Operations ==
Oji Paper produces paper for printing, writing, and packaging. It also manufactures containers made from paper products, chemicals used in paper production, and paper packaging equipment.

The company has 86 production sites throughout Japan, and forestry operations in Australia, Brazil, Canada, China, Germany, New Zealand, and other countries worldwide.

== History ==
Oji Paper Company was founded on February 12, 1873, by industrialist Shibusawa Eiichi as Shoshi Kaisha (抄紙会社). Mills were established in 1875 in the village of Ōji (then a suburb of Tokyo) and in 1889 in Shizuoka. In 1893, Shibusawa renamed the company Oji Paper after the location of its first mill. Earlier, in 1871, William Anderson had traveled to Japan to oversee the construction of the initial paper mill.

In 1933, Oji Paper merged with Fuji Paper and Karafuto Industries, developing into an oligopolistic corporation that produced 80 percent of Japan's Western-style paper.

Following World War II, the Excess Economic Powers Decentralization Act was implemented to prevent anti-competitive activities caused by overconcentration. This law broke the company up into three separate entities: Tomakomai Paper, Jujo Paper, and Honshu Paper.

Tomakomai Paper began as a single-plant operation. However, upon expanding into Kasugai, Aichi, in 1952, the company was renamed Oji Paper Industries, and in 1960, it was renamed Oji Paper again. The company expanded its business by acquiring competitors, including Kita Nippon Paper, Nippon Pulp Industries, and Toyo Pulp.

In 1993, Oji Paper merged with Kanzaki Paper to become New Oji Paper. In 1996, New Oji Paper and Honshu Paper merged to become Oji Paper once again.

In 2012, Oji Paper transitioned to a pure holding company system and started anew under the trade name Oji Holdings Corporation.

=== New Zealand operations ===
In September 2024, Oji Fibre Solutions announced the closure of its Auckland pulp and paper recycling mill in mid-December 2024. While the company intended to continue operations at its Kinleith Mill near Tokoroa, it also confirmed it would shift the processing of recycled paper waste from New Zealand to its Malaysian paper mill in Banting. Malaysian environmentalist Lay Peng Pua expressed concern that this increased volume of paper waste would pollute the nearby Langat River.

In mid-November 2024, Oji Fibre Solutions proposed halting paper processing at the Kinleith Mill by 2025, a move affecting 230 jobs. Oji CEO Jon Ryder said that manufacturing paper had become unprofitable, though he noted the mill would continue to produce pulp. The company said it would consult with workers and finalize its decision by mid-January 2025. In mid-February 2025, Oji Fibre Solutions confirmed its plans to halt paper processing operations at Kinleith Mill by the end of June.

== Gallery ==
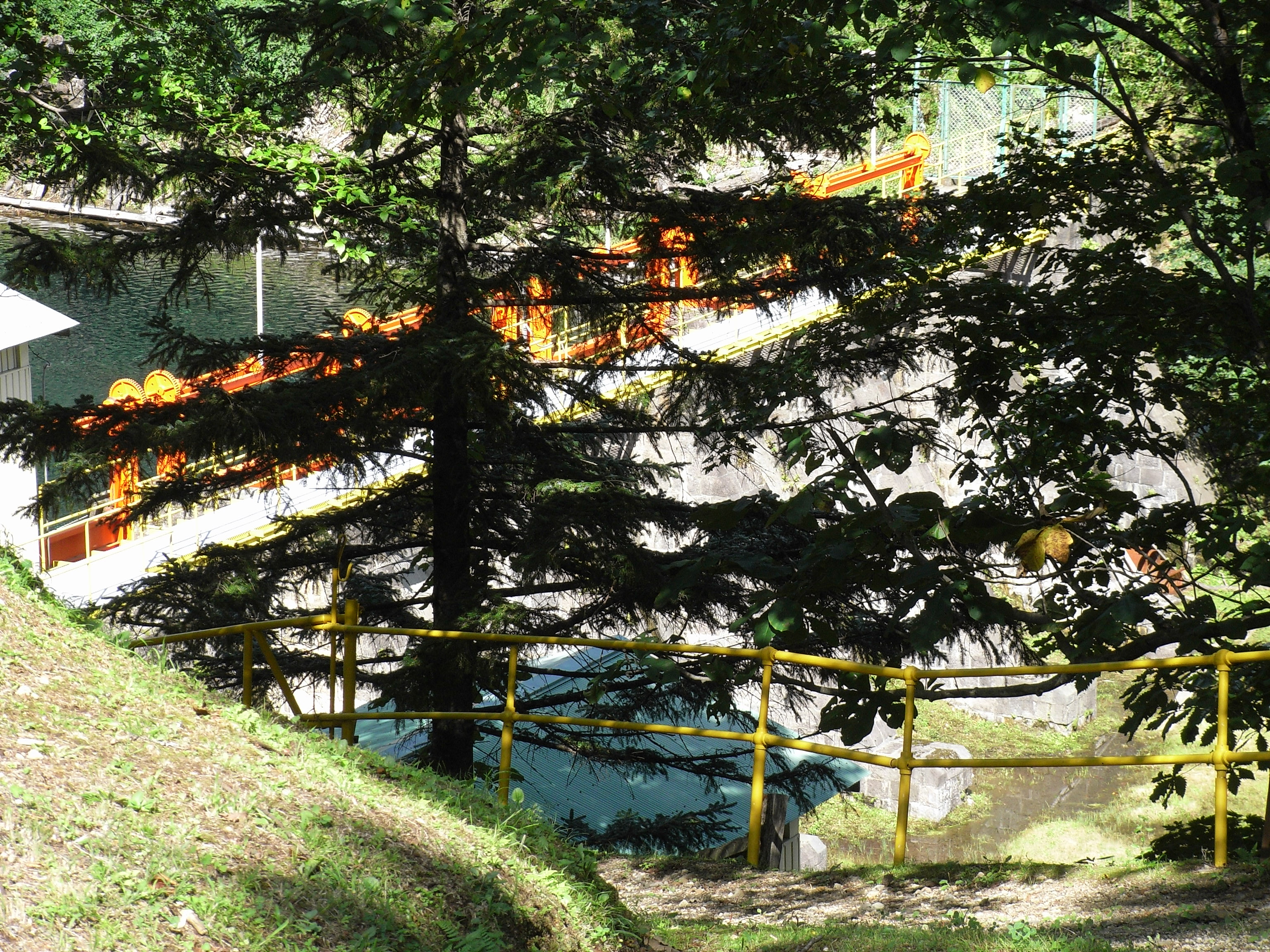
Chitose Dam plant intake facility

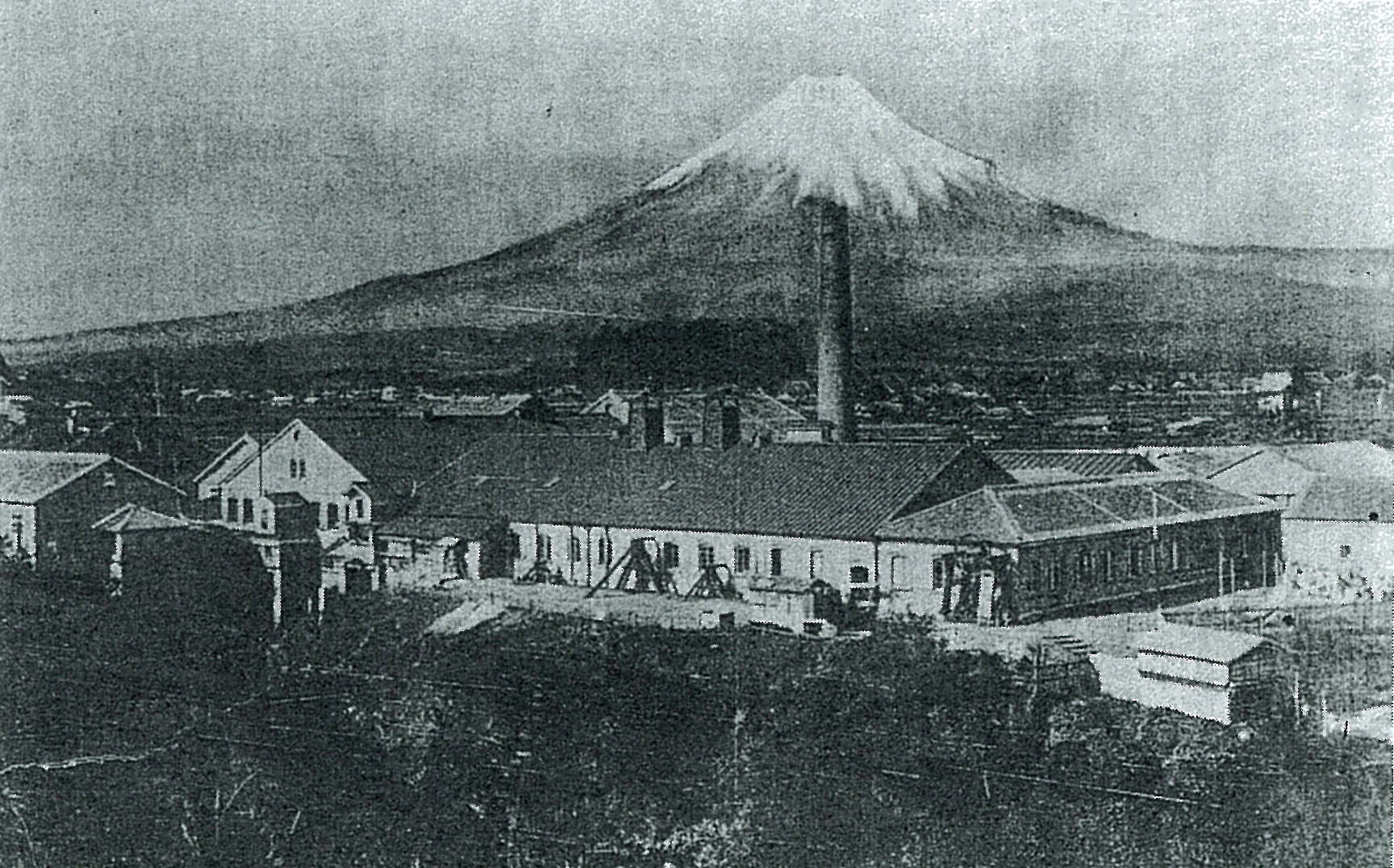
Fuji Paper factory c. 1890

== See also ==
- Ginjirō Fujiwara
- Oji Eagles
- Pulp and paper industry
