= Pulp and Paper =

Trade magazine

Pulp and Paper was the largest United States–based trade magazine for the pulp and paper industry. It was owned by RISI and based in Boston. The magazine existed between 1998 and 2015. In 2016 it merged with Paper360° Magazine, owned by the Technical Association of the Pulp and Paper Industry (TAPPI).

== See also ==
- Paper engineering
