= Edet =

Edet is a given name and surname. The Edet is given to male children born on Ederi day (Sundays) in the Efik Calendar.

- Glory Emmanuel Edet, Nigerian advocate for women and child-rights
- Emilie Edet (born 1946), Nigerian sprinter
- Louis Edet (1914–1979), Inspector General of the Nigeria Police Force
- Nicolas Edet (born 1987), French road cyclist
- Victor Edet (born 1966), Nigerian sprinter

== Given name ==
- Edet Asuquo Okon (born 1994), Management consultant and Chief executive officer of Okuts Farms
- Donatus Edet Akpan (born 1952), Nigerian bishop of the Roman Catholic Diocese of Ogoja
- Edet Amana (born 1938), Nigerian engineer
- Edet Belzberg, American documentary filmmaker
- Eyo Edet Okon (1914–2010), Nigerian Christian clergy
- Edet Otobong (born 1986), Cameroonian footballer
- Joseph Edet Akinwale Wey (1918–1991) Nigerian Navy admiral and Vice President of Nigeria

== See also ==
- Edet FK, Swedish football club
- Lilla Edet, is a locality and the seat of Lilla Edet Municipality in Västra Götaland County, Sweden
- Lilla Edets IF, Swedish football club
- Lilla Edet Municipality, is a municipality in Västra Götaland County in western Sweden
