= Elia Nuqul =

Palestinian business person

Elia Nuqul (1928 – June 2022) was a Palestinian Jordanian businessperson based in Amman. He founded the Nuqul Group, a business conglomerate with 31 companies, including Fine Hygienic Holding.

== Early life ==
Nuqul was born in Ramla to a Palestinian Christian family with three brothers and four sisters. Growing up, he had aspirations to become an engineer. His father Costandi was a greengrocer and his mother sold embroidery from their home. He had begun his studies at the American University of Beirut when his family were expelled from their home during the Nakba in 1948. They fled to Ramallah, Al Salt, and then Amman.

== Career ==
In 1952, Nuqul founded the Nuqul Group under the name Nuqul Brothers. It started off by trading and importing food and consumer goods. Nuqul included "Brothers" in the name with expectations that it would eventually become a family business. In the late 1950s, the company started producing hygienic paper products. In 1958, Nuqul founded Fine, a tissue and paper product manufacturer, and is considered the first Arab to bring such industry into that region. By 2009, the Nuqul Group included 31 companies and over 5,500 employees.

The Elia Nuqul Foundation was formed in 2008. The Foundation provides education to people in underprivileged areas. The idea for the Foundation was from Nuqul's time in Ramla when he was unable to complete his education due to financial conditions and his refugee status.

== Personal life and death ==
Nuqul had a wife Samira and four children. He died in June 2022 at the age of 93.
