= Klippans bruk =

- Location within Skåne Location within Sweden
- Coordinates: 56°07′N 13°09′E
- Country: Sweden
- Province: Skåne
- County: Skåne County
- Municipality: Klippan Municipality

Area
  - Total: 0.44 km^{2} (0.17 sq mi)

Population (31 December 2010)
  - Total: 16 715
  - Density: 721/km^{2} (1,870/sq mi)
- Time zone: UTC+1 (CET)
  - Summer (DST): UTC+2 (CEST)

Klippans bruk is a locality situated in Klippan Municipality, Skåne County, Sweden with 314 inhabitants in 2010.
