= Valaichchenai Paper Mill =

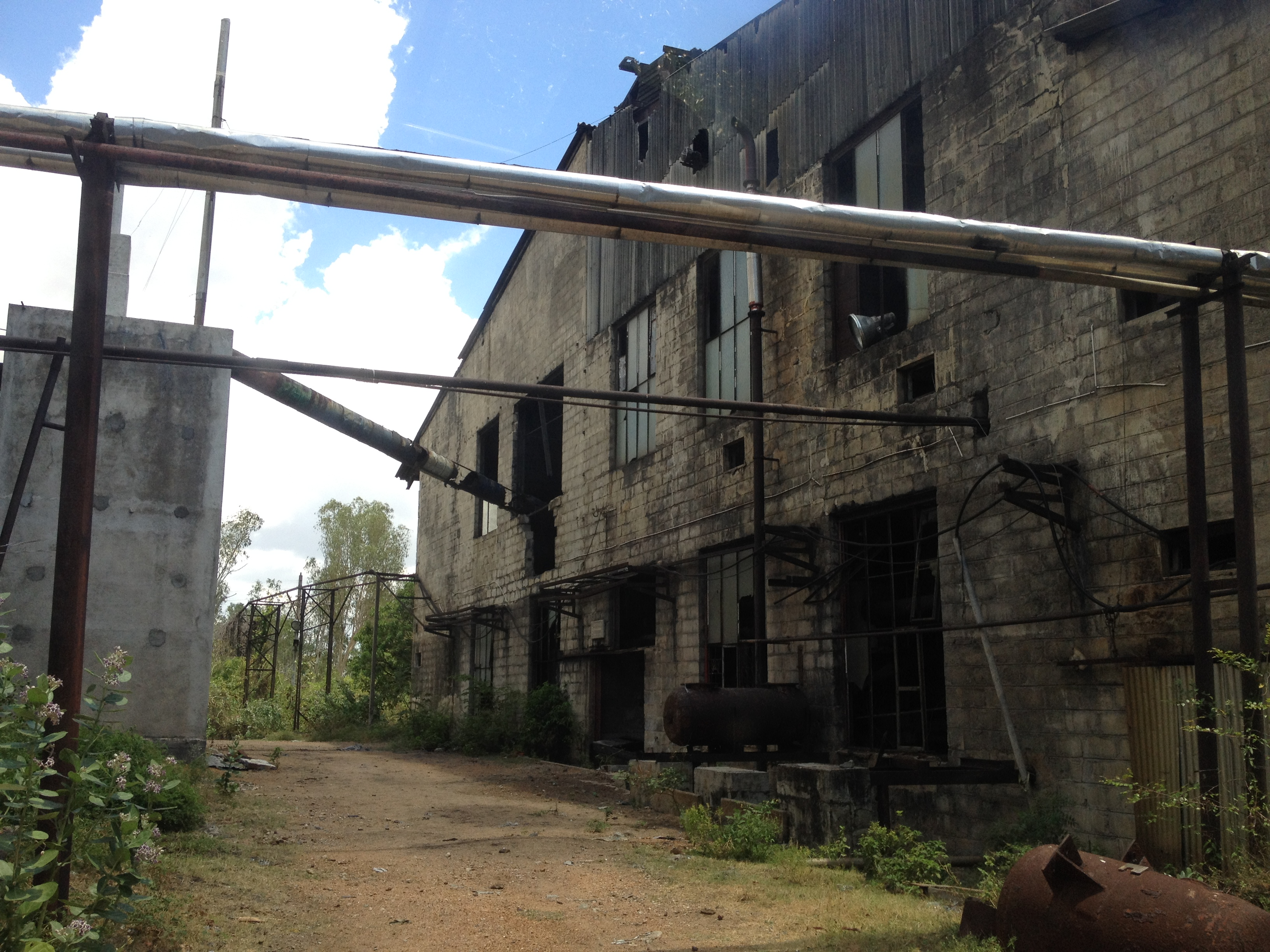
- Dilapidated buildings at Paper Mill
- Built: 1955
- Location: Valaichchenai, Batticaloa, Sri Lanka
- Coordinates: 7°55′34.04″N 81°30′13.95″E
- Industry: Paper mill

Valaichchenai Paper Mill is a state-owned paper mill located in the town of Valaichchenai, Batticaloa District, Sri Lanka. It is considered that this mill is the first paper factory established in Sri Lanka.

== History ==
Valaichchenai paper mill was established in 1955 with a total investment of about 32 million rupees and it was commissioned for commercial operation in 1956. In 1958 it was renamed as Eastern Paper Mills Corporation. At that time this paper mill was considered as the biggest factory in the Eastern province, especially in the Batticaloa district. In the period of 1970s, the mill had around 3,000 employees. In 1976 it became state-owned and then run as a state venture. With the expansion programme, carried out by the funds generated from the Valaichchennai, a second paper mill was established at Embilipitiya in 1976. These two State corporations satisfied 70% of the total paper demand of the country. The name of the Eastern Paper Mills Corporation was subsequently changed to the National Paper Corporation (NPL).

With the escalation of the Sri Lankan Civil War during the 1990s in the Eastern province, the government implemented new changes in the market policies with regard to the import of paper. That directly caused industrial difficulties for the Paper Corporation and also resulted in the lowering of production levels at the paper mill drastically in the latter part of the 1990s. It was then largely converted into a waste paper recycling centre with a newly established network of collecting sub-centres. As time passed, production operations at the paper mill were disrupted gradually with the reasons of bad financial situation and lack of experienced staff.

== Present ==
After the defeat of LTTE, the government recommenced the operations of the Valaichchenai paper mill again, but which is now on a very low profile.

== See also ==
- List of paper mills
