= Johann Prokop Mayer =

Austrian naturalist and botanist

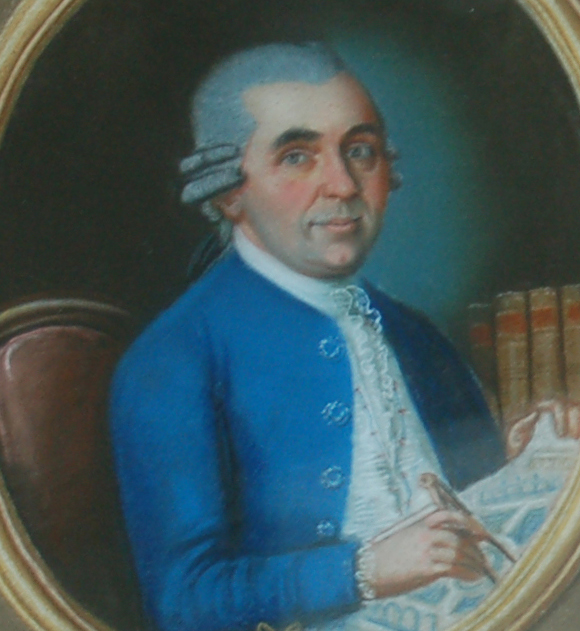
Johann Prokop Mayer

Johann Prokop Mayer (2 July 1737, Muncifaj, Bohemia – 25 July 1804) was an Austrian naturalist and botanist. He created the flower gardens at the Würzburg Residence.

== Biography ==
After three years of apprenticeship in Prague, Mayer travelled as a journeyman through Germany, Austria, France, Holland and England from 1755. In the years 1760/61 Mayer worked for 15 months as a journeyman in the Veitshöchheim court garden with the then court gardener Georg Joseph Ott.

In 1770 he succeeded Johann Demeter as court gardener to the Würzburg Prince-Bishop Adam Friedrich von Seinsheim and held this position until his death. It was here, among other things, that he drew up the plans for the redesign of the Court Garden until 1779, which were also largely implemented. At the same time, he worked as a planner and advisor for aristocratic houses in neighbouring estates and ran a nursery for fruit trees himself.

Between 1776 and 1801 he published his three-volume textbook on the study of fruit varieties Pomona Franconica with botanical book illustrations by the Nuremberg native Wolfgang Adam. In his pomological standard work, Mayer described all the fruit varieties cultivated in the court garden as well as his many years of experience in fruit tree cultivation. On full-page plates, artistically cut shaped fruit trees and on hand-coloured copperplate engravings, over 500 ripe fruits are shown. In 2007, the Würzburg University Library and the Martin von Wagner Museum, together with the Bavarian Palace Department, organized an exhibition on this book in the Würzburg Residence. As a result, a Munich art dealer became aware of the book and privately procured a double portrait of the court gardener and his wife Eleonora Winterstein from Gaibach, which the Martin von Wagner Museum purchased in May 2009. It is only with these portraits that a portrait of the Würzburg court gardener can be shown to the public for the first time from autumn 2009. The two pastels from 1786 were painted by the Moravian-born painter Peter Straßburger, who lived in Würzburg from 1774. The portraits bear Mayering's signature on the reverse, from which experts conclude that both portraits are from the family of Mayer's youngest daughter.

== Works ==
- 1776–1801 Pomona Franconica oder natürliche Abbildung und Beschreibung der besten und vorzüglichsten europäischen Gattungen der Obstbäume und Früchte, welche in dem Hochfürstlichen Hofgarten zu Würzburg gezogen werden, Verlag Winterschmidt, Nürnberg
- 1779 Bemerkungen über natürliche Gegenstände der Gegend um Schüttenhofen in Böhmen, und eines Theils der benachbarten Gebirge. Abhandlungen einer Privatgesellschaft in Böhmen, zur Aufnahme der Mathematik, der vaterländischen Geschichte, und der Naturgeschichte 4: 132–184.
- 1786 Verzeichniß der in- und ausländischen Gewächse an Blumen, Stauden, Sträuchern und Bäumen, welche sich dermalen im hiesigen Hochfürstlichen Hof- und Residenzgarten vorfinden, uns sowohl im freyen, als in Glas- und Treibhäusern gezogen, und verwahrt werden: Zur Bequemlichkeit und Erinnerung der ..., Verlag Sartorius, 1786
