= Chitose Dam =

Dam in Hokkaido Prefecture, Japan

Chitose No.3 Dam
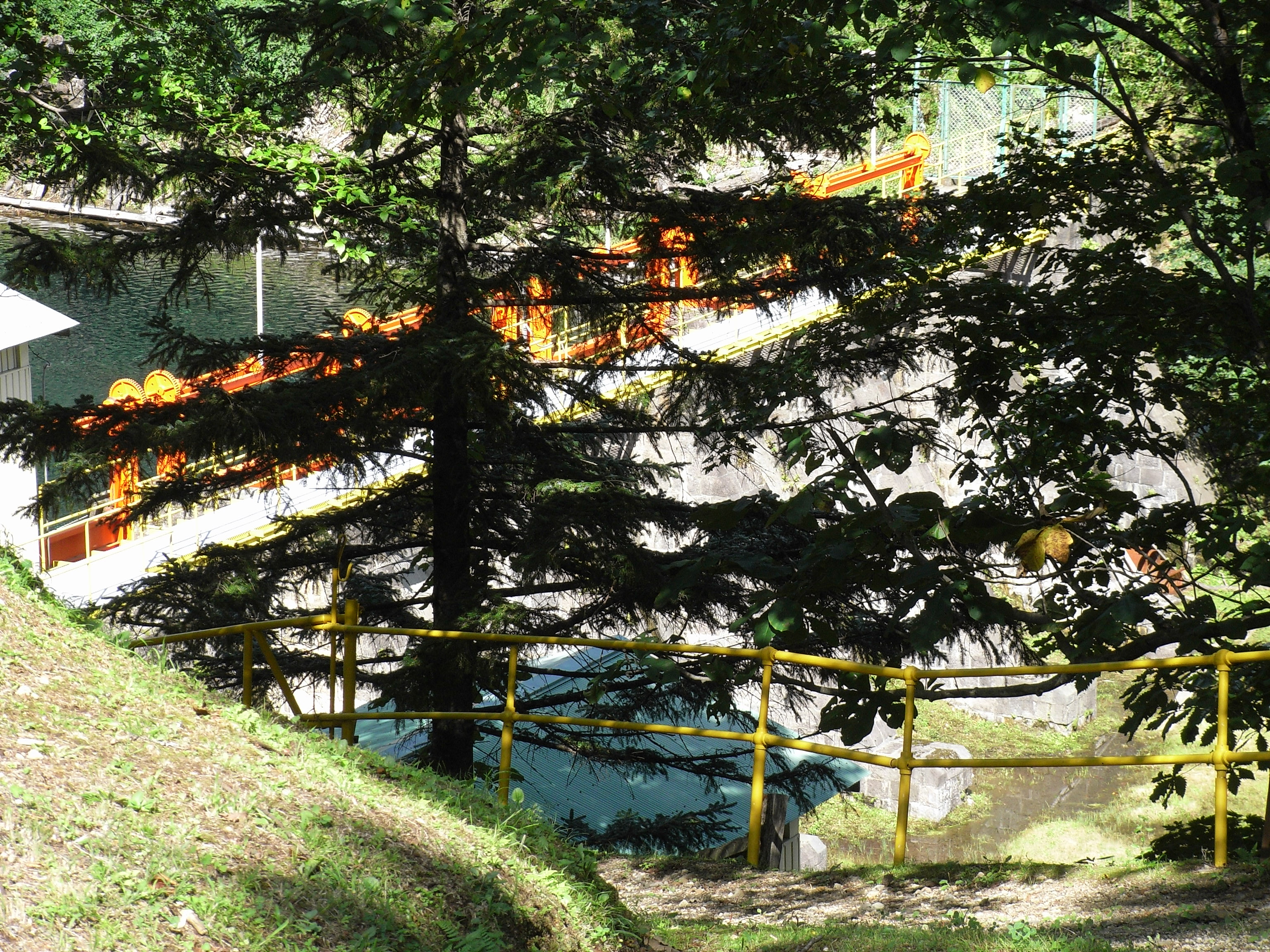

- Location within Japan
- Location: Chitose, Hokkaido, Japan.
- Coordinates: 42°47′46″N 141°30′21″E
- Construction began: 1916
- Opening date: 1918

Dam and spillways
- Impounds: Chitose River
- Height: 23.6 m (77 ft)
- Length: 119.4 m (392 ft)

Reservoir
- Total capacity: 3648 thousand cubic meters
- Catchment area: 243.4 km^{2}
- Surface area: 54 hectares

Chitose No.3 Dam (Japanese: 千歳第三ダム) is a gravity dam located in Hokkaido, Japan. The dam is used for power production. The catchment area of the dam is 243.4 km^{2}. The dam impounds about 54 ha of land when full and can store 3648 thousand cubic meters of water. The construction of the dam began in 1916 and was completed in 1918.
