= Amritsar rugs and carpets =

Amritsar rugs and carpets are produced in Amritsar, located in the northwest of India, near the Kashmir region. While India does in fact boast a long history of weaving fine rugs and carpets, Amritsar rugs are unique in the wide gamut of traditional Indian styles. This is because the weavers of Amritsar had not developed a distinctive style of rug making until the early nineteenth century – hundreds of years after other regions of India had first developed their own weaving traditions. While regions of southern and western India began weaving Persian-influenced rugs during the reign of the Mughal emperors, who preferred the traditional aesthetics and design elements of the Persians, the weavers of Amritsar took their direction from somewhere different: the sensibilities of the West.

Generally speaking, Amritsar rugs are based upon European influence and Western taste, a decision made by the weavers following the incredible explosion in demand for carpets in both the United States and Europe during the nineteenth century. Basing design elements on Western tastes as opposed to Indian traditions, the weavers of Amritsar fashioned a style that is unique and easily distinguished from other Indian styles. Using high quality wool, Amritsar rugs are manufactured with a cotton foundation, double weft and an asymmetrical knot - all of which contribute to its luxurious feel.

== History ==
After a fashion, the Western influence present in the design of Amritsar rugs is a reflection of the influence of Colonial rule on India. Amritsar rugs may be seen, collectively, as an attempt by the craftspeople of Northern India to capitalize on the demand for exotic rugs and textiles that followed on the heels of Queen Victoria's 1851 Great Exhibition in the Crystal Palace, an affair that exposed a tremendous volume of laypeople to the treasures of the Orient. Exotic art became extraordinarily fashionable during this time, especially in London, where pride in the unparalleled scope and influence of the British Empire, combined with the huge amount of wealth that was pouring into the United Kingdom because of this influence, created a market for luxurious, "Oriental" artwork, the scale of which had never been seen before.

Featuring designs that center upon elegant, curvilinear botanical motifs, and consisting of superior materials, Amritsar carpets were intentionally manufactured to be desirable and easy to appreciate for the metropolitan collectors of London, the United States, Canada, and other Western markets. Amritsar rugs are generally made with a softer, earthier palette, often with a tendency to burgundy or aubergine tones.

In today's rug world, Amritsar rugs remain highly desirable and widely collected, largely because of their flexible formal repertoire and coloration. So long-lasting and deep was the Western influence on nineteenth century India that the unique styles that emerged from this place at this time are widely admired by art historians, critics, and commentators centuries after their debut onto the world stage.
