= Cincinnati Steam Paper Mill =

Steam mill in Cincinnati, Ohio, US

The Cincinnati Steam Paper Mill was the first steam mill in Cincinnati, Ohio, established in 1825 (200 years ago) and owned by the Messrs. Phillips & Spear company. It provided paper for the surrounding area as well as surplus shipped to New Orleans, Louisiana.
