= Security Paper Mill =

Iranian government secure paper mill

- Native name: کارخانه تولید کاغذ اسناد بهادار
- Romanized name: Kārkhaneh-e Tolid-e Kāqaz va Asnād-e Bahādār
- Type: State-owned enterprise
- Industry: Papermaking
- Founded: 2002; 24 years ago
- Headquarters: Amol County
- Area served: Iran
- Products: Security paper
- Parent: Central Bank of Iran
- Website: cbi.ir

The Security Paper Mill (Persian: کارخانه تولید کاغذ اسناد بهادار, Kārkhāneh-ye Tolid-e Kāghaz-e Asnād-e Bahādār, 'security paper manufacturing plant', acronym in transliteration TAKAB) is a paper mill and a subsidiary of the Central Bank of Iran responsible for production of security papers, including those used for Iranian rial banknotes.

TAKAB is Iran’s principal facility for the production of security paper used in banknotes and other financial instruments. The complex is located in Amol, in Mazandaran Province, on a 25-hectare (62-acre) site approximately 7 kilometres (4.3 mi) along the Amol–Chamestan road, with built structures totaling about 37,950 square metres (408,500 sq ft). According to the Central Bank of Iran (CBI), the Banknote Printing and Minting Organization established TAKAB to transition toward domestic production of banknote paper—which had previously been fully imported from Europe until 1983—thus reducing reliance on foreign suppliers.

The CBI has reported that complex is equipped with specialized personnel and advanced machinery designed to produce a wide range of high-security papers, including multi-tone watermark substrates and papers incorporating embedded security threads and other features. It has furthermore stated that TAKAB's manufacturing line became fully operational in 2002, when it began producing security paper; on which paper it later that year started printing 10,000-rial banknotes using that paper.

Products manufactured at the facility has included banknote paper for 100, 200, 500, 1,000, 5,000, 10,000, 20,000, and 50,000 rial banknkotes, the Iran Cheque series (500,000 rials and upward), also effectively used as banknotes, as well as participation papers and ordinary cheques. The CBI states that these meet quality standards comparable to similar foreign-produced security papers.
