= Green Bay Packaging =

American pulp and paper company based in Green Bay, Wisconsin

- Type: Private
- Industry: Pulp and paper
- Founded: 1933
- Founder: George F. Kress
- Headquarters: Green Bay, Wisconsin, U.S.
- Number of locations: 40
- Area served: United States
- Key people: William Kress, Chairman and CEO
- Products: Corrugated packaging; folding cartons; containerboard; POP displays; pressure-sensitive labels
- Number of employees: 4,500
- Website: www.gbp.com

Green Bay Packaging is a privately held American manufacturer of fiber-based packaging products based in Green Bay, Wisconsin. Established in 1933, the company operates as a vertically integrated enterprise, with activities including timberland management, containerboard and paper production, and the manufacturing of corrugated packaging, folding cartons, point-of-purchase (POP) displays and coated label products. It operates facilities across 16 U.S. states

GBP has implemented environmental programs, including a closed-loop process water system and Net-Zero Water validation at its Green Bay mill. The company has expanded through acquisitions and infrastructure investments, such as construction of a paper mill in Wisconsin and modernization of its kraft linerboard facility in Arkansas.

== History ==
=== Early years (1930s – 1960s) ===
The business originated as the Green Bay Box Company, established in 1933 by George F. Kress. It initially manufactured corrugated shipping boxes. In 1942, Green Bay Box Company established its Folding Carton Division. Six years later, in 1948, it formed Green Bay Pulp and Paper to produce corrugated medium.

In 1957, the company began recovering and processing old corrugated containers (OCC) to manufacture medium-grade paperboard. During the 1950s and 1960s, it expanded through the creation of a research and development unit, and the purchase of Briggs Packaging in Chicago. Additional locations were also established in Cincinnati, Ohio; Tulsa, Oklahoma; and Fort Worth, Texas.

In 1961, Jim Kress became president. In 1963, the company merged with Green Bay Pulp & Paper to form Green Bay Packaging. A factory was opened in Wausau, Wisconsin, in 1964. In 1965, construction began on the Arkansas Kraft Pulp and Paper Mill in Morrilton, Arkansas. That same year, GBP opened another factory in Fremont, Ohio.

=== Expansion (1970s – 1990s) ===
In 1991, GBP redesigned its Green Bay mill to produce containerboard from 100% recycled fiber and introduced a closed-loop process water system, one of the first of its kind in the industry. In 1992, it was among the first companies to eliminate liquid effluent discharge.

Will Kress became president in 1995. Founder George F. Kress was inducted into the Paper Industry International Hall of Fame in 1996.

=== 2000s – 2010s ===
In 2005, Jim Kress was also inducted into the Paper Industry International Hall of Fame.

In 2014, the company acquired Midland Packaging and Display of Franksville, Wisconsin and Great Lakes Packaging Corporation of Germantown, Wisconsin.

In 2015, the company acquired Baird Display of Waukesha, Wisconsin.

In 2018, the company acquired Wisconsin Packaging Corporation Fort Atkinson, Wisconsin, Grand Traverse Container, and Citadel Industries. That year, it also began construction of a new paper mill in Green Bay and a 170,000-square-foot sales and distribution center in Downers Grove, Illinois.

=== Recent Developments (2020s) ===
In 2020, GBP acquired Third Dimension Inc., an Ohio-based packaging and design company.

In 2021, the company opened a $500 million paper mill in Green Bay, the state’s first new mill in over 35 years. The same year, it began construction of a 600,000-square-foot corrugator plant in Fort Worth, Texas. In December 2021, its Green Bay mill achieved Net-Zero Water validation under UL’s Environmental Claim Validation Procedure, the first 100% recycled containerboard facility to do so.

In June 2022, GBP acquired Interstate Packaging Corp., based in Albert Lea, Minnesota.

In June 2024, it completed the acquisition of SMC Packaging Group of Springfield, Missouri. That year, GBP also broke ground on a 270,000-square-foot corrugated plant in Germantown, Wisconsin, acquired land in Casa Grande, Arizona for a new plant, and leased space in Aurora, Illinois.

On June 3, 2025, the company announced Project PowerPack, a multiyear, $1 billion capital investment to modernize its kraft linerboard mill in Morrilton, Arkansas. The project includes infrastructure upgrades, a new electric turbine generator, and the acquisition of approximately 300 acres for future expansion. The project is expected to create 35 jobs, adding to the facility’s existing workforce of 620.

In 2025, Green Bay Packaging ranked #69 on Forbes’ list of America’s Best Midsize Employers.

== Operations ==
The company operates facilities in multiple U.S. states, including Arizona, Arkansas, California, Georgia, Illinois, Michigan, Maryland, Minnesota, Missouri, North Carolina, Ohio, Oklahoma, Tennessee, Texas, Virginia, Wisconsin, as well as in Mexico.

As part of Project PowerPack, the Morrilton mill is undergoing upgrades expected to nearly double production capacity and reduce greenhouse gas emissions through on-site power generation.

== Sustainability ==
GBP’s Green Bay, Wisconsin mill uses a closed-loop process-water system that avoids direct process-water discharge. In December 2021, UL validated the mill’s net-zero-water claim; local coverage followed in February 2022. The Council of the Great Lakes Region also summarized the validation and its context.

GBP participates in third-party fiber-sourcing and chain-of-custody programs. An NSF third-party audit posted in the Sustainable Forestry Initiative database found the company’s Fiber Resources Division in conformance with the SFI Forest Management Standard in 2020, specifying the scope and audit findings.

In 2021, the American Forest & Paper Association recognized the Green Bay mill with a Leadership in Sustainability award for water stewardship.

== Community involvement ==
The George Kress Foundation, established in 1953, supports charitable, educational, and cultural initiatives, particularly in the communities where the company operates.

== See also ==
- Pulp and paper industry in the United States
- Corrugated box design
- Sustainable packaging
- Recycling in the United States
