= Valaichchenai =

Valaichchenai வாழைச்சேனை වාලසේන
- Town
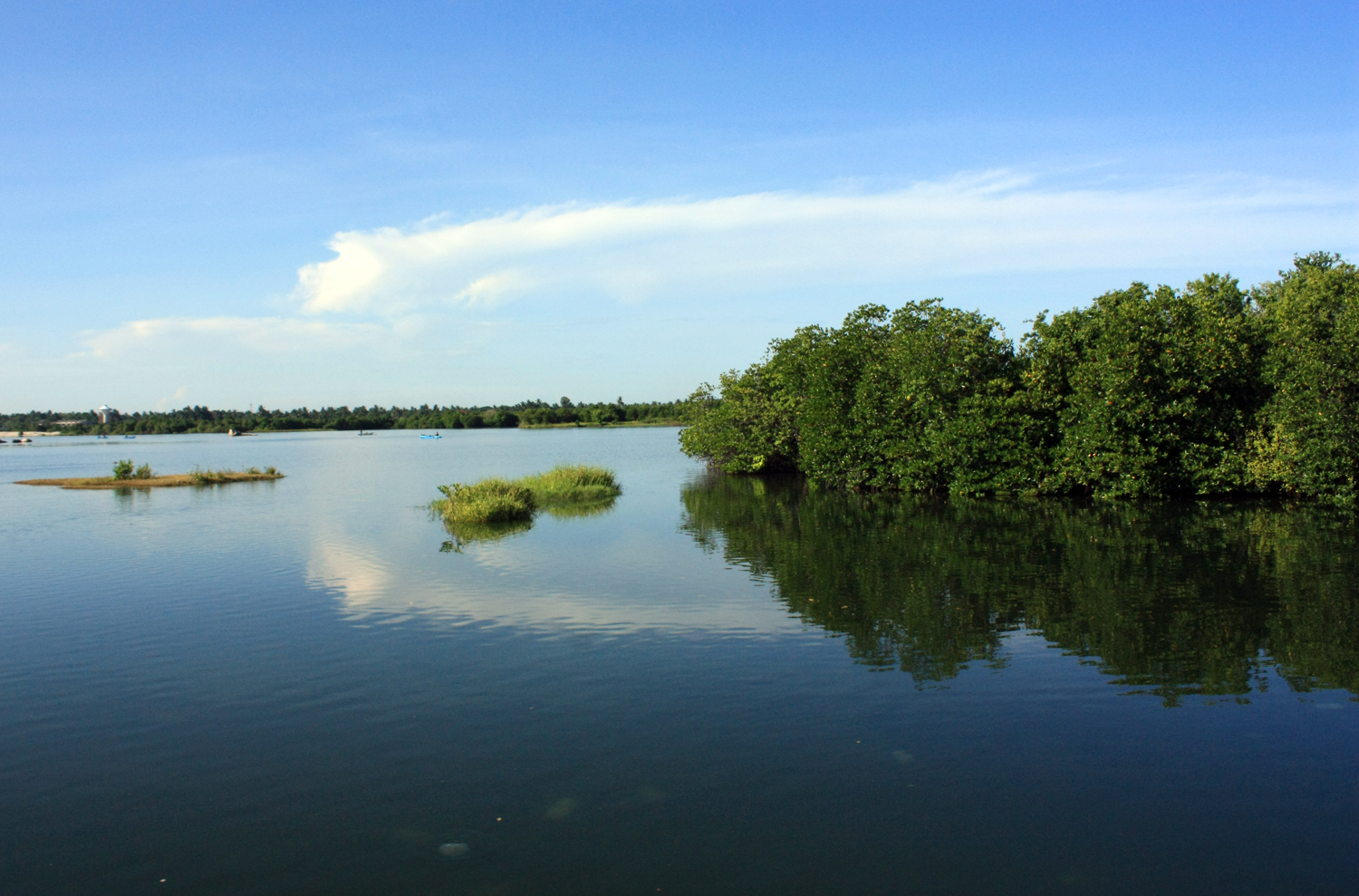
- The lagoon at Valaichchennai

- Location within Sri Lanka
- Coordinates: 7°55′10″N 81°31′53″E
- Country: Sri Lanka
- Province: Eastern
- District: Batticaloa
- DS Division: Koralai Pattu

Valaichchenai (Tamil: வாழைச்சேனை Valaichchenai; Sinhala: වාලසේන / වාලච්චේන waalasena / Valaichchena) is a town in the Eastern Province of Sri Lanka. It could also be spelled as Valaichenai or Valachchenai. The world-famous Pasikudah Beach is located about 3 km east of Valaichenai along the Indian Ocean. Pasikudah beach is famous for shallow and calm sea water.

== Population ==
Valaichchchenai is home to Tamil communities and also some Muslims communities. Tamil people are the majority here and some Muslim people live in the west of the Valaichchenai Main Street. There were banana, coconut and paddy plantations which provided the main income along with some fishing. This changed with the establishment of a paper manufacturing plant.

== Transport ==
It has a railway station on the broad gauge system of Sri Lanka Railways.

== Schools ==
There are several schools in Valaichenai, including:

- Valaichenai Hindu College, also known as the first school of Valaichenai
- Valaichchenai Ayisha Balika M V (Valaichchenai Ayisha Mahalir M V)
- AN-NOOR NATIONAL SCHOOL
- Kalkudah namagal vidyalayam
- Peththelai Vipulananda Vidiyalayam
- Chndrakanthan vidyalayam
- Vani Vidyalayam
- Karuwakerni Vigneswara Vidyalayam
- Vinayagaapuram Vinayagar Vidyalayam
- Sri Krishna School

== See also ==
- The American Batticaloa Development Fund, provided electricity connection to Sri Krishna School
