= Khanna Paper Mills =

Indian paper mill

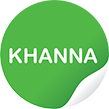
Logo

Khanna Paper Mills Ltd(KPM) is an Amritsar, India based business, which manufactures and supplies writing and printing papers, newsprint papers, and paperboards, and is the largest plant in the country using paper waste. It is the first paper mill in India to produce writing and printing paper from de-inked pulp. The paper is exported to SAARC countries, Africa, and the Middle East.

== History ==
The company was incorporated in 1985 by Rattan Chand Khanna, as the senior founders promoter, and his wife Satyawati Son Charanjit. Their family contributed to the founding. Now, his sons are directors of the company.

== Business ==
Khanna Paper Mills Ltd annually produces 10000 million tons of writing printing paper, news print and paper board using approximately 15000 million tons of recycled fiber.

The paper mill has a 200-kg-per-day sun dried board unit, and produces 100 tons of newsprint daily, and a plant produces 100 tons of writing and printing paper daily.
