= Sara Varone =

Italian model

- Born: Sara Varone; 27 December 1972 (age 53); Rome, Italy
- Occupations: Actress, television presenter
- Years active: 2006–present

Sara Varone (born 27 December 1972) is an Italian television host.

In 2006 her TV first appearance on Mediaset main channel Canale 5 in the Sunday afternoon show Buona Domenica hosted by Paola Perego. In the show together with Elisabetta Gregoraci held a regular session devoted to "Gossip". She remained part of the cast until 2009.

In 2009 she appeared on stage in a production of "Airplane" (a theater adaptation of the movie of the same name). And in 2010 in the play "Un giorno lungo quarant'anni" with Gianfranco D'Angelo.

== Additional ==
Earned a BS degree in Psychology at La Sapienza university in Rome with the goal to become a sexual psychologist.
