= Jinhai Pulp Mill =

Coordinates: 19.773172°N 109.175177°E

Jinhai Pulp Mill (Hainan Jinhai Pulp and Paper Industry Co., Ltd.)
- Type: NGO
- Industry: Pulp and paper
- Founded: November 2004
- Headquarters: Yangpu Economic Development Zone, Hainan, China
- Number of locations: 1
- Number of employees: 1,600
- Parent: Asia Pulp & Paper

The Jinhai Pulp Mill also known as Hainan Jinhai Pulp and Paper is the largest pulp mill in China, and the world's largest single-line pulp mill.

Located on a 4 km^{2} area in Yangpu Economic Development Zone, the mill uses the Hainan PM 2, the world's largest paper machine. The machine is 428m long and 11.6m wide, producing paper that is 10.96m wide.

Using nine large presses, the mill has a capacity of 1,200,000 metric tons per year.

The first phase of the project involved an investment of 10.2 billion RMB.

The mill produces hardwood kraft paper using roughly equal volumes of fibre from Eucalyptus grandis and Acacia crassicarpa sourced largely from Asia Pulp and Paper's 233,300 hectare plantation forests located on Hainan island, with additional pulp imported from Indonesia, Cambodia, and Vietnam.

== Technical specifications ==
=== Stock preparation ===
- DIP 355 tons per day
- NBKP 710 tons per day
- LBKP 1,655 tons per day
- BCTMP 1,185 tons per day
- PCC 700 tons per day

=== Paper machine ===
- Uncoated paper weight: 151.1 g/m^{2}
- Finished paper weight: 255.3 g/m^{2}
- Wire width: 11,800 mm
- Maximum operating speed: 1,700 m/min
- Design speed: 2,000 m/min
- Speed of Janus: 1,500 m/min
- Speed of VariPlus: 2,500 m/min
- Parent roll diameter: 3,500 mm
- Maximum production: 4,537 tons per day
