= List of Superfund sites in Maryland =

This is a list of Superfund sites in Maryland designated under the Comprehensive Environmental Response, Compensation, and Liability Act (CERCLA) environmental law. The CERCLA federal law of 1980 authorized the United States Environmental Protection Agency (EPA) to create a list of polluted locations requiring a long-term response to clean up hazardous material contaminations. These locations are known as Superfund sites, and are placed on the National Priorities List (NPL).

The NPL guides the EPA in "determining which sites warrant further investigation" for environmental remediation. As of March 10, 2011, there were 19 Superfund sites on the National Priorities List in Maryland. Two additional sites are currently proposed for entry on the list. Four sites have been cleaned up and removed from the list.

== Superfund sites ==
Proposed for addition to National Priorities List
Deleted from National Priorities List

CERCLIS ID	Name	County	Reason	Proposed	Listed	Construction completed	Partially deleted	Deleted
MDD980691588	Limestone Road	Allegany	Inorganic chemicals and heavy metals including zinc and lead were detected in on-site soils. Surface water is contaminated with chromium, cadmium, and zinc. Site and residential wells have been found to contain manganese and nickel.	12/30/1982	09/08/1983	09/28/2000	–	–
MD4690307844	Curtis Bay Coast Guard Yard	Anne Arundel	Soil is contaminated in certain areas with semi-volatile organic compounds, metals, polychlorinated biphenyls (PCBs), pesticides and dioxin.	09/13/2001	09/05/2002	–	–	–
MD9210020567	Fort George G. Meade	Anne Arundel	Tetrachloroethylene (PCE), trichloroethylene (TCE), other volatile organic compounds, atrazine and certain pesticides.	04/01/1997	07/28/1998	–	11/12/1999	–
MDD064882889	Mid-Atlantic Wood Preservers, Inc.	Anne Arundel		10/15/1984	06/10/1986	09/23/1993	–	07/18/2000
MDD980705099	Middletown Road Dump	Anne Arundel		12/30/1982	09/08/1983	03/17/1986	–	04/18/1988
MDD980918387	68th Street Dump	Baltimore		01/19/1999	–	–	–	–
MDD980555478	Chemical Metals Industries, Inc.	Baltimore City		10/23/1981	–	12/30/1982	–	12/30/1982
MDD980923783	Kane & Lombard Street Drums	Baltimore City		10/15/1984	06/10/1986	–	–	–
MDD981038334	Sauer Dump	Baltimore		03/10/2011	03/13/2012	–	–	–
MDD985366756	Dwyer Property Ground Water Plume	Cecil		10/21/2010	03/10/2011	–	–	–
MDD982364341	Ordnance Products, Inc.	Cecil		05/10/1993	09/25/1997	–	–	–
MDD980705164	Sand, Gravel & Stone	Cecil		12/30/1982	09/08/1983	–	–	–
MDD000218008	Spectron, Inc.	Cecil		10/14/1992	05/31/1994	–	–	–
MDD980504344	Woodlawn County Landfill	Cecil		01/22/1987	07/22/1987	06/25/2001	–	–
MD7170024684	Indian Head Naval Surface Warfare Center	Charles		02/13/1995	09/29/1995	–	–	–
MDD985397249	Fort Detrick Area B Ground Water	Frederick		09/03/2008	04/09/2009	–	–	–
MD2210020036	Aberdeen Proving Ground (Edgewood Area)	Harford		04/10/1985	02/21/1990	–	–	–
MD3210021355	Aberdeen Proving Ground (Michaelsville Landfill)	Harford		04/10/1985	10/04/1989	06/11/2001	–	–
MDD980504195	Bush Valley Landfill	Harford		06/24/1988	03/31/1989	08/02/2001	–	–
MD0570024000	Andrews Air Force Base	Prince George's		07/28/1998	05/10/1999	–	–	–
MD0120508940	Beltsville Agricultural Research Center (USDA)	Prince George's		05/10/1993	05/31/1994	–	–	–
MD9570024803	Brandywine Defense Reutilization and Marketing Office	Prince George's		07/28/1998	05/10/1999	–	–	–
MD7170024536	Patuxent River Naval Air Station	St. Mary's		01/18/1994	05/31/1994	–	–	–
MDD980704852	Southern Maryland Wood Treating	St. Mary's		10/15/1984	06/10/1986	04/23/2001	–	04/05/2005
MDD003061447	Central Chemical (Hagerstown)	Washington		06/17/1996	09/25/1997	–	–	–

== See also ==
- List of Superfund sites in the United States
- List of environmental issues
- List of waste types
- TOXMAP
