= List of Superfund sites in Puerto Rico =

This is a list of Superfund sites in Puerto Rico designated under the Comprehensive Environmental Response, Compensation, and Liability Act (CERCLA) environmental law. The CERCLA federal law of 1980 authorized the United States Environmental Protection Agency (EPA) to create a list of polluted locations requiring a long-term response to clean up hazardous material contaminations. These locations are known as Superfund sites, and are placed on the National Priorities List (NPL). The NPL guides the EPA in "determining which sites warrant further investigation" for environmental remediation. As of March 10, 2011, there were 16 Superfund sites on the National Priorities List in Puerto Rico. No sites are currently proposed for addition to the list. Five sites have been cleaned up and removed from the list.

== Superfund sites ==
Proposed for addition to National Priorities List
Deleted from National Priorities List

CERCLIS ID	Name	Municipality	Reason	Proposed	Listed	Construction completed	Partially deleted	Deleted
PRD987367349	Pesticide Warehouse I	Arecibo		09/23/2004	09/27/2006	–	–	–
PRD090370537	RCA Del Caribe	Barceloneta		12/30/1982	09/08/1983	09/06/2000	–	06/17/2005
PRD980301154	Upjohn Facility	Barceloneta		09/08/1983	09/21/1984	09/09/1998	–	–
PRN000206319	Cabo Rojo Ground Water Contamination	Cabo Rojo		10/21/2010	03/10/2011	–	–	–
PRN000206359	Hormigas Ground Water Plume	Caguas		10/21/2010	03/10/2011	–	–	–
PRN000204538	Cidra Ground Water Contamination	Cidra		03/08/2004	07/22/2004	–	–	–
	Dorado Ground Water Contamination	Dorado				–	–	–
PRD980509129	Barceloneta Landfill	Florida		12/30/1982	09/08/1983	09/27/2000	–	–
PRD980763783	Fibers Public Supply Wells	Guayama		09/08/1983	09/21/1984	09/16/1999	–	–
PRD980640965	Frontera Creek	Humacao		12/30/1982	09/08/1983	09/30/1997	–	12/29/1998
PRD090282757	GE Wiring Devices	Juana Díaz		12/30/1982	09/08/1983	06/20/2000	–	10/16/2000
PRD980512362	Juncos Landfill	Juncos		12/30/1982	09/08/1983	09/19/2005	–	–
PRD987367299	Pesticide Warehouse III	Manatí		09/05/2002	04/30/2003	–	–	–
PRN000205831	Maunabo Area Ground Water Contamination	Maunabo		04/19/2006	09/27/2006	–	–	–
PRN000205957	San German Ground Water Contamination	San Germán		09/19/2007	03/19/2008	–	–	–
PR4170027383	Naval Security Group Activity	Toa Baja		06/24/1988	10/04/1989	09/30/1997	–	10/07/1998
PRD987376662	Scorpio Recycling, Inc.	Toa Baja		10/22/1999	02/04/2000	–	–	–
PRD090290685	Papelera Puertorriquena, Inc.	Utuado		04/09/2009	09/23/2009	–	–	–
PRD980763775	Vega Alta Public Supply Wells	Vega Alta		09/08/1983	09/21/1984	03/25/2003	–	–
PRD987366101	V&M/Albaladejo	Vega Baja		06/17/1996	12/23/1996	09/29/2000	–	10/22/2001
PRD980512669	Vega Baja Solid Waste Disposal	Vega Baja		04/23/1999	07/22/1999	–	–	–
PRN000204694	Atlantic Fleet Weapons Training Area - Vieques	Vieques		08/13/2004	02/11/2005	–	–	–

== See also ==
- List of Superfund sites in the United States
- List of environmental issues
- List of waste types
- TOXMAP
- List of Superfund sites in Hawaii
