= List of Superfund sites in Alaska =

A map of Superfund sites in Alaska. Red dots are current sites, while green dots are sites that have been cleaned up and removed from the NPL.

This is a list of Superfund sites in Alaska designated under the Comprehensive Environmental Response, Compensation, and Liability Act (CERCLA) environmental law. The CERCLA federal law of 1980 authorized the United States Environmental Protection Agency (EPA) to create a list of polluted locations requiring a long-term response to clean up hazardous material contaminations.

These locations are known as Superfund sites, and are placed on the National Priorities List (NPL). The NPL guides the EPA in "determining which sites warrant further investigation" for environmental remediation. As of May 7, 2020 there were six Superfund sites on the National Priorities List in Alaska. No additional sites are currently proposed for entry on the list. Three sites have been cleaned up and removed from the list.

== Superfund sites ==
Deleted from National Priorities List

CERCLIS ID	Name	Borough or Census Area	Reason	Proposed	Listed	Construction completed	Partially deleted	Deleted
AK4170024323	Adak Naval Air Station	Aleutians West	Groundwater, sediments, surface water, and soil in several locations on the island are contaminated with petroleum-related constituents, polychlorinated biphenyls (PCBs), metals, chlorinated solvents, ordnance, explosives, and unexploded ordnance. Groundwater contaminated with petroleum and organic chemicals.	10/14/1992	05/31/1994	–	–	–
AK8570028649	Elmendorf Air Force Base	Anchorage	Soil and shallow groundwater beneath the various landfills, fuel storage facilities, training areas, and maintenance hangars located on base have been contaminated with petroleum hydrocarbons and other fuel contaminants, volatile organic compounds (VOCs), polycyclic aromatic hydrocarbons (PAHs), polychlorinated biphenyls (PCBs), pesticides, asphalt and associated chemicals, and heavy metals including lead.	07/14/1989	08/30/1990	–	–	–
AK6214522157	Fort Richardson (USARMY)	Anchorage	Sediment and surface water contaminated with white phosphorus. Soil at the Roosevelt Road Transmitter Site is contaminated with volatile organic compounds (VOCs), heavy metals, and polychlorinated biphenyls (PCBs). Soil and groundwater at the Poleline Road Disposal Area is contaminated with VOCs.	06/23/1993	05/31/1994	09/28/2006	–	–
AKD980978787	Standard Steel & Metals Salvage Yard (USDOT)	Anchorage	Soil contaminated with lead, polychlorinated biphenyls (PCBs), solvents, dioxins, and furan.	07/14/1989	08/30/1990	09/16/1999	–	09/30/2002
AKD004904215	Alaska Battery Enterprises	Fairbanks North Star	Soil contaminated with lead that had been released from the battery yard.	06/24/1988	03/31/1989	03/02/1993	–	07/26/1996
AKD980988158	Arctic Surplus	Fairbanks North Star	On-site groundwater contaminated with trichloroethylene (TCE). On-site soil contaminated with industrial solvents, polychlorinated biphenyls (PCBs), and lead.	10/26/1989	08/30/1990	04/18/2005	–	09/25/2006
AK1570028646	Eielson Air Force Base	Fairbanks North Star	Groundwater contains lead and volatile organic compounds (VOCs) such as benzene, xylene, and toluene (BTEX compounds). Several areas of subsurface petroleum-contaminated soil and floating petroleum product are the sources of continuing groundwater contamination.	07/14/1989	11/21/1989	09/30/1998	–	–
AK6210022426	Fort Wainwright	Fairbanks North Star	Groundwater and soil contaminated with solvents, petroleum products, pesticides, fuel additives, lead and polynuclear aromatic hydrocarbons (PAHs). Sediments contain PAHs and low level pesticides.	07/14/1989	08/30/1990	09/27/2002	–	–
AK0001897602	Salt Chuck Mine	Outer Ketchikan	Water and sediments in Kasaan Bay and Lake Ellen Creek contaminated with heavy metals from mine tailings.	09/23/2009	03/04/2010	Estimated May–July 2022	–	–

Note: There are also two NPL equivalent sites in the state of Alaska, which are not included in the table above.

== See also ==
- List of Superfund sites in the United States
- List of environmental issues
- List of waste types
- TOXMAP
