= List of Superfund sites in North Carolina =

This is a list of Superfund sites in North Carolina designated under the Comprehensive Environmental Response, Compensation, and Liability Act (CERCLA) environmental law. The CERCLA federal law of 1980 authorized the United States Environmental Protection Agency (EPA) to create a list of polluted locations requiring a long-term response to clean up hazardous material contaminations. These locations are known as Superfund sites, and are placed on the National Priorities List (NPL).

The NPL guides the EPA in "determining which sites warrant further investigation" for environmental remediation. As of December 16, 2010, there were 35 Superfund sites on the National Priorities List in North Carolina. Two additional sites have been proposed for entry on the list. One site has been cleaned up and removed from the list, and four other sites have been partially deleted from the NPL.

== Superfund sites ==
Proposed for addition to National Priorities List
Deleted from National Priorities List

CERCLIS ID	Site Name	County	Reason	Proposed	Listed	Construction completed	Partially deleted	Deleted
NCN000409895	Ore Knob Mine	Ashe		04/09/2009	09/23/2009	–	–	–
NCD981475932	FCX, Inc. (Washington Plant)	Beaufort		06/24/1988	03/31/1989	09/22/2005	–	–
NCD981023260	Potter's Septic Tank Service Pits	Brunswick		06/24/1988	03/31/1989	09/27/2000	–	–
NCD044447589	Blue Ridge Plating Company	Buncombe		04/27/2005	09/14/2005	09/27/2007	–	–
NCD095459392	Chemtronics, Inc.	Buncombe		12/30/1982	09/08/1983	03/25/1993	–	–
NCD003149556	CTS of Asheville	Buncombe		03/10/2011	–	–	–	–
NCD044440303	Bypass 601 Ground Water Contamination	Cabarrus		10/15/1984	06/10/1986	03/11/1999	09/28/1998	–
NCD003446721	Celanese Corp. (Shelby Fiber Operations)	Cleveland		10/15/1984	06/10/1986	03/25/1993	04/17/1998	–
NCD024766719	Wright Chemical Corporation	Columbus		03/04/2010	–	–	–	–
NC1170027261	Marine Corps Air Station Cherry Point	Craven		08/23/1994	12/16/1994	–	–	–
NCD003188828	Cape Fear Wood Preserving	Cumberland		06/10/1986	07/22/1987	09/25/2001	–	–
NCD003188844	Carolina Transformer Co.	Cumberland		01/22/1987	07/22/1987	08/10/2005	–	–
NCD986175644	Davis Park Road TCE	Gaston		07/28/1998	01/19/1999	09/27/2000	–	–
NCD980729602	Jadco-Hughes Facility	Gaston		10/15/1984	06/10/1986	12/19/1996	–	–
NCD986187128	North Belmont PCE	Gaston		04/23/1999	07/22/1999	06/21/2004	–	–
NCD122263825	JFD Electronics/Channel Master	Granville		06/24/1988	10/04/1989	09/29/2000	–	–
NCSFN0406989	Barber Orchard	Haywood		01/11/2001	09/13/2001	–	–	–
NCD981026479	Benfield Industries, Inc.	Haywood		06/24/1988	10/04/1989	09/19/2001	–	–
NCD079044426	General Electric Co/Shepherd Farm	Henderson		02/07/1992	12/16/1994	09/28/2000	11/01/1996	–
NCD095458527	FCX, Inc. (Statesville Plant)	Iredell		06/24/1988	02/21/1990	09/29/2001	–	–
NCD062555792	Sigmon's Septic Tank Service	Iredell		09/23/2004	04/27/2005	09/30/2009	–	–
NCD001810365	Martin-Marietta, Sodyeco, Inc.	Mecklenburg		12/30/1982	09/08/1983	09/29/1999	–	–
NCD982096653	Ram Leather Care	Mecklenburg		04/30/2003	09/29/2003	–	–	–
NCN000407447	Aberdeen Contaminated Ground Water	Moore		03/19/2008	09/03/2008	–	–	–
NCD980843346	Aberdeen Pesticide Dumps	Moore		01/22/1987	03/31/1989	09/30/2003	–	–
NCD981927502	Geigy Chemical Corp. (Aberdeen Plant)	Moore		06/24/1988	10/04/1989	07/20/1998	–	–
NCN000407480	Horton Iron and Metal	New Hanover		10/21/2010	–	–	–	–
NCD981021157	New Hanover County Airport Burn Pit	New Hanover		06/24/1988	03/31/1989	08/26/2003	–	–
NCD986187094	Reasor Chemical Company	New Hanover		09/13/2001	09/05/2002	09/25/2007	–	–
NCD024644494	ABC One Hour Cleaners	Onslow		06/24/1988	03/31/1989	08/08/2002	–	–
NC6170022580	Marine Corps Base Camp Lejeune	Onlsow		06/24/1988	10/04/1989	–	–	–
NCN000410161	GMH Electronics	Person		04/09/2009	09/23/2009	–	–	–
NCD980840409	Charles Macon Lagoon and Drum Storage	Richmond		01/22/1987	07/22/1987	11/06/1996	–	–
NCD991278953	National Starch & Chemical Corp.	Rowan		04/10/1985	10/04/1989	09/29/2010	–	–
NCD003200383	Koppers Co., Inc. (Morrisville Plant)	Wake		06/24/1988	03/31/1989	09/11/1997	09/02/1997	–
NCD980557656	NC State University (Lot 86, Farm Unit 1)	Wake		10/15/1984	06/10/1986	09/27/2006	–	–
NCD003202603	Ward Transformer	Wake		09/05/2002	04/30/2003	–	–	–
NCD980602163	Roadside PCB Spill	Warren		12/30/1982	09/08/1983	03/07/1986	–	03/07/1986

== See also ==
- List of Superfund sites in the United States
- List of environmental issues
- List of waste types
- TOXMAP
