= List of Superfund sites in Mississippi =

This is a list of Superfund sites in Mississippi designated under the Comprehensive Environmental Response, Compensation, and Liability Act (CERCLA) environmental law. The CERCLA federal law of 1980 authorized the United States Environmental Protection Agency (EPA) to create a list of polluted locations requiring a long-term response to clean up hazardous material contaminations. These locations are known as Superfund sites, and are placed on the National Priorities List (NPL).

The NPL guides the EPA in "determining which sites warrant further investigation" for environmental remediation. As of May 1, 2010, there were four Superfund sites on the National Priorities List in Mississippi. Two more sites have been proposed for entry on the list and three others have been cleaned up and removed from it.

== Superfund sites ==
Proposed for addition to National Priorities List
Deleted from National Priorities List

CERCLIS ID	Name	County	Reason	Proposed	Listed	Construction completed	Partially deleted	Deleted
MSD004006995	American Creosote Works, Inc.	Winston	Soil and sediment contamination by PAHs from former wood treatment operations. Potential for groundwater and surface water contamination.	06/14/2001	09/13/2001	–	–	–
MSD008154486	Chemfax, Inc.	Harrison	Groundwater, sediment and soil contamination by base neutral acids, PAHs and VOCs.	06/23/1993	–	–	–	–
MSD046497012	Davis Timber Company	Lamar	PCP, dioxins, and furans contamination of on-site soil and sediments in local creek and lake from former wood treatment operations.	05/11/2000	07/27/2000	–	–	–
MSD980710941	Flowood Site	Rankin	Lead contamination of wetland soil and sediments.	09/08/1983	09/21/1984	09/17/1993	–	02/16/1996
MSD980840045	Newsom Brothers/Old Reichhold Chemicals, Inc.	Marion	Waste, soil, sediments and surface water contamination by benzene, ethyl benzene, xylenes, PAHs and PCP from former wood derivatives manufacture and chemical processing.	10/15/1984	06/10/1986	08/08/1997	–	09/27/2000
MSD065490930	Picayune Wood Treating	Pearl River	Former wood treatment operations have contaminated soil with dioxins, PAHs and naphthalene, potentially contaminated groundwater and sediments with creosote.	03/08/2004	07/22/2004	–	–	–
MSD056029648	Potter Co.	Copiah	Soil contamination by PCBs and groundwater contamination by TCE. Two nearby municipal wells have been closed because of TCE contamination.	05/10/1993	–	–	–	–
MSD086556388	Sonford Products	Rankin	Soil, surface water and groundwater contamination by PCP, dioxins, pesticides and metals from chemical production.	09/27/2006	03/07/2007	–	–	–
MSD980601736	Walcotte Chemical Co. Warehouses	Washington	Primary contaminants in the warehouses were formic acid, various pesticides, and volatile organic compounds (VOCs), such as toluene.	Cleanup completed before formal creation of NPL.		12/30/1982	–	12/30/1982
MSD008182081	Hercules Inc.	Forrest	On-Site soil and groundwater is contaminated with substances that were used at the facility prior to its closing. These are varnishes, pesticides, and insecticides such as toxaphene.	03/18/2022	12/20/2022			
MSD990866329	Kerr-McGee Chemical Corp - Columbus	Lowndes	Contaminated groundwater, soil, and sediment. Possible contaminants include pentachlorophenol and creosote.		09/16/2011			
MSD000272385	Red Panther Chemical Company	Coahoma	Contaminated soil by pesticides, arsenic, toxaphene, and dieldrin.	03/10/2001	09/16/2011			09/30/2020
MSD007037278	Rockwell International Wheel & Trim	Grenada	Contamination of TCE and hexavalent chromium in groundwater and in subsurface soil.		09/13/2018			
MSD000828558	Southeastern Wood Preserving	Madison	Contaminated soil, surface water, and sediment. Potential contaminants are coal tar, creosote, and pentachlorophenol.	March 2011	05/15/2012			

== See also ==
- List of Superfund sites in the United States
- List of environmental issues
- List of waste types
- TOXMAP
