= List of Superfund sites in Kansas =

This is a list of Superfund sites in Kansas designated under the Comprehensive Environmental Response, Compensation, and Liability Act (CERCLA) environmental law. The CERCLA federal law of 1980 authorized the United States Environmental Protection Agency (EPA) to create a list of polluted locations requiring a long-term response to clean up hazardous material contaminations. These locations are known as Superfund sites, and are placed on the National Priorities List (NPL).

The NPL guides the EPA in "determining which sites warrant further investigation" for environmental remediation. As of March 26, 2010, there were 11 Superfund sites on the National Priorities List in Kansas. One more site has been proposed for entry on the list. Five sites have been cleaned up and removed from the list.

== Superfund sites ==
Proposed for addition to National Priorities List
Deleted from National Priorities List

CERCLIS ID	Name	County	Reason	Proposed`	Listed	Construction completed	Partially deleted	Deleted
KSD007241656	29th and Mead Ground Water Contamination	Sedgwick	Ground water and soil are contaminated with volatile organic compounds (VOCs) including trichloroethylene (TCE), carbon tetrachloride, toluene, and vinyl chloride.	06/24/1988	02/21/1990	–	–	04/29/1996
KSD981710247	57th and North Broadway Streets Site	Sedgwick	Volatile organic compounds (VOCs), including benzene, perchloroethylene (PCE), trichloroethylene (TCE), toluene, vinyl chloride, xylene, and heavy metals, including arsenic, barium, cadmium, chromium, and lead have been detected in on-site soil and residential and industrial wells.	02/07/1992	10/14/1992	09/10/2002	–	–
KSD046746731	Ace Services	Thomas	Soils, surface waste water, and sludge in the lagoon area were contaminated with chromium. Ground water in the Ogallala Aquifer is contaminated with chromium.	02/13/1995	09/29/1995	09/22/2003	–	–
KSD980500789	Arkansas City Dump	Cowley	Groundwater and sediments contaminated with oil. Sludge contained sulfuric acid, polycyclic aromatic hydrocarbons (PAHs), other organics, heavy metals, ammonia, and sulfur.	12/30/1982	09/08/1983	09/08/1992	–	03/01/1996
KSD980686174	Big River Sand Company	Sedgwick	Leaking drums contaminated the site and groundwater with hazardous paint sludges, solvents, volatile organic compounds, and metals such as selenium, iron, and manganese.	10/15/1984	06/10/1986	06/28/1988	–	10/14/1992
KSD031349624	Chemical Commodities, Inc.	Johnson	Soil and ground water are contaminated with various metals; volatile organic compounds (VOCs) and semi-VOCs, primarily, trichloroethylene (TCE), carbon tetrachloride, and perchloroethylene (PCE), and pesticides.	01/18/1994	05/31/1994	01/11/2012	–	–
KSD980741862	Cherokee County	Cherokee	The Cherokee County Superfund site is the Kansas portion of the Tri-State district. Acidic waters in mine shafts throughout the site, chat piles, tailings impoundments, surface waters in the mine pits, and streams draining the site contain significant concentrations of lead, zinc, and cadmium.	12/30/1982	09/08/1983	–	–	–
KSD980632301	Doepke Disposal (Holliday)	Johnson	Groundwater, soil, and leachate are contaminated with volatile organic compounds (VOCs), pesticides, polychlorinated biphenyls (PCBs), polycyclic aromatic hydrocarbons (PAHs), and heavy metals.	12/30/1982	09/08/1983	09/29/1997	–	–
KS6214020756	Fort Riley	Geary and Riley	Groundwater contaminated with vinyl chloride, solvents, perchloroethylene (PCE), and other volatile organic compounds. Landfill debris contains waste oils and degreasing solvents.	07/14/1989	08/30/1990	–	–	–
KSD007135429	Hydro-Flex Inc.	Shawnee	On-site and off-site groundwater contained low levels of copper and chromium.	06/24/1988	03/31/1989	06/30/1992	–	11/09/1993
KSD980631980	John's Sludge Pond	Sedgwick	Pond contained highly acidic sludge and acidic water. Sludge contaminated with heavy metals including lead, as well as polychlorinated biphenyls (PCBs).	12/30/1982	09/08/1983	01/31/1991	–	01/06/1992
KSD980631766	Obee Road	Reno	Ground water is contaminated with volatile organic compounds such as trichloroethylene (TCE), vinyl chloride, and chloroform.	01/22/1987	07/22/1987	09/09/2011	–	–
KSD000829846	Pester Refinery Company	Butler	Ground water contaminanted with benzene, toluene, ethylene and xylene (BTEX compounds). The burn pond sludge and soil beneath the pond were found to be contaminated with BTEX compounds and polycyclic aromatic hydrocarbons (PAHs).	06/24/1988	03/31/1989	09/08/1999	–	–
KSD065735912	Plating, Inc.	Barton	Soil and ground water contaminated with chromium.	09/19/2007	03/19/2008	–	–	–
KSD980862726	Strother Field Industrial Park	Cowley	Groundwater contaminated with volatile organic compounds (VOCs) including trichloroethylene (TCE).	10/15/1984	06/10/1986	10/28/2008	–	–
KS0001402320	Tri-County Public Airport	Morris	Groundwater is contaminated with trichloroethylene (TCE) and degradation products.	07/27/2000	–	–	–	–
KSD984985929	Wright Ground Water Contamination	Ford	Groundwater is contaminated with pesticides, heavy metals, and volatile organic compounds (VOCs) including benzene, bromodichloromethane, and carbon tetrachloride	10/02/1995	06/17/1996	07/30/2008	–	–

== See also ==
- List of Superfund sites in the United States
- List of environmental issues
- List of waste types
- TOXMAP
