= List of Superfund sites in New Hampshire =

This is a list of Superfund sites in New Hampshire designated under the Comprehensive Environmental Response, Compensation, and Liability Act (CERCLA) environmental law. The CERCLA federal law of 1980 authorized the United States Environmental Protection Agency (EPA) to create a list of polluted locations requiring a long-term response to clean up hazardous material contaminations. These locations are known as Superfund sites, and are placed on the National Priorities List (NPL).

The NPL guides the EPA in "determining which sites warrant further investigation" for environmental remediation. As of November 29, 2010, there were 20 Superfund sites on the National Priorities List in New Hampshire. One additional site is currently proposed for entry on the list. No sites have been cleaned up and removed from the list.

== Superfund sites ==
Proposed for addition to National Priorities List
Deleted from National Priorities List

CERCLIS ID	Name	County	Reason	Proposed	Listed	Construction completed	Partially deleted	Deleted
NHD980520217	Troy Mills Landfill	Cheshire		04/30/2003	09/29/2003	09/30/2005	–	–
NHN000103313	Chlor-Alkali Facility (Former)	Coos		04/27/2005	09/14/2005	–	–	–
NHD001079649	Fletcher's Paint Works & Storage	Hillsborough		06/24/1988	03/31/1989	–	–	–
NHD981889629	Mohawk Tannery	Hillsborough		05/11/2000	–	–	–	–
NHD001091453	New Hampshire Plating Co.	Hillsborough		07/29/1991	10/14/1992	09/28/2006	–	–
NHD980671002	Savage Municipal Water Supply	Hillsborough		09/08/1983	09/21/1984	09/12/2006	–	–
NHD980671069	South Municipal Water Supply Well	Hillsborough		09/08/1983	09/21/1984	12/15/1994	–	–
NHD099363541	Sylvester	Hillsborough		12/30/1982	09/08/1983	04/08/1992	–	–
NHD980524086	Auburn Road Landfill	Rockingham		12/30/1982	09/08/1983	04/03/1998	–	–
NHD018958140	Beede Waste Oil	Rockingham		06/17/1996	12/23/1996	–	–	–
NHD064424153	Coakley Landfill	Rockingham		10/15/1984	06/10/1986	09/29/1999	–	–
NHD062002001	Kearsarge Metallurgical Corp.	Carroll		09/08/1983	09/21/1984	09/24/1993	–	–
NHD092059112	Keefe Environmental Services	Rockingham		12/30/1982	09/08/1983	06/10/1993	–	–
NHD980503361	Mottolo Pig Farm	Rockingham		04/10/1985	07/22/1987	09/30/1993	–	–
NHD990717647	Ottati & Goss/Kingston Steel Drum	Rockingham		12/30/1982	09/08/1983	09/19/2008	–	–
NH7570024847	Pease Air Force Base	Rockingham		07/14/1989	02/21/1990	09/26/2000	–	–
NHD062004569	Tinkham Garage	Rockingham		12/30/1982	09/08/1983	04/07/1995	–	–
NHD981063860	Town Garage/Radio Beacon	Rockingham		06/24/1988	03/31/1989	09/30/1992	–	–
NHD980520191	Dover Municipal Landfill	Strafford		12/30/1982	09/08/1983	–	–	–
NHD980520225	Somersworth Sanitary Landfill	Strafford		12/30/1982	09/08/1983	09/09/2005	–	–
NHD989090469	Tibbetts Road	Strafford		04/10/1985	06/10/1986	09/29/1998	–	–

== See also ==
- List of Superfund sites in the United States
- List of environmental issues
- List of waste types
- TOXMAP
