= List of Superfund sites in North Dakota =

This is a list of Superfund sites in North Dakota designated under the Comprehensive Environmental Response, Compensation, and Liability Act (CERCLA) environmental law. The CERCLA federal law of 1980 authorized the United States Environmental Protection Agency (EPA) to create a list of polluted locations requiring a long-term response to clean up hazardous material contaminations. These locations are known as Superfund sites, and are placed on the National Priorities List (NPL). The NPL guides the EPA in "determining which sites warrant further investigation" for environmental remediation. As of May 5, 2010, North Dakota is the only state with no Superfund sites on the National Priorities List. No sites are currently proposed for entry on the list, but two have been cleaned up and removed from the NPL.

== Superfund sites ==
Deleted from National Priorities List

CERCLIS ID	Name	County	Reason	Proposed	Listed	Construction completed	Partially deleted	Deleted
NDD980716963	Arsenic Trioxide Superfund site	Richland, Ransom, and Sargent	Arsenic in the drinking water from natural sources and historical pesticide use.	12/30/1982	09/08/1983	09/30/1992	–	07/05/1996
NDD980959548	Minot Landfill	Ward	Groundwater, surface water, leachate, soil, sediment and solid waste contaminated by benzene and compounds; other volatile organic compounds (VOCs); metals including arsenic, copper and zinc; and phenols.	06/24/1988	03/31/1989	09/23/1996	–	04/01/1997

== See also ==
- List of Superfund sites in the United States
- List of environmental issues
- List of waste types
- TOXMAP
