= List of Superfund sites in Iowa =

This is a list of Superfund sites in Iowa designated under the Comprehensive Environmental Response, Compensation, and Liability Act (CERCLA) environmental law. The CERCLA federal law of 1980 authorized the United States Environmental Protection Agency (EPA) to create a list of polluted locations requiring a long-term response to clean up hazardous material contaminations. These locations are known as Superfund sites, and are placed on the National Priorities List (NPL). The NPL guides the EPA in "determining which sites warrant further investigation" for environmental remediation.

As of 1 May 2010, there were eleven Superfund sites on the National Priorities List in Iowa. One more site has been proposed for entry on the list and ten others have been cleaned up and removed from it.

== Superfund sites ==
Proposed for addition to National Priorities List
Deleted from National Priorities List

CERCLIS ID	Name	County	Reason	Proposed	Listed	Construction completed	Partially deleted	Deleted
IAD042581256	Aidex Corporation	Mills	Groundwater was contaminated by atrazine and soil was contaminated by aldrin, chlordane other pesticides and stored waste, from pesticide production and a 1976 fire on-site.	12/30/1982	09/08/1983	06/30/1992	–	10/21/1993
IAD980687933	Des Moines TCE	Polk	Groundwater and soil contamination by VOCs (including PCE, TCE and vinyl chloride), pesticides and herbicides from former industrial operations and waste disposal practices.	12/30/1982	09/08/1983	09/21/1998	–	–
IAD980685804	E.I. du Pont De Nemours & Company, Inc. (County Road X23)	Lee	Groundwater and soil were contaminated by cadmium, lead, other heavy metals, and VOCs from former paint waste disposal. Livestock and approximately 1,200 people within three miles of the site depend on private wells for drinking water.	06/24/1988	08/30/1990	09/29/1993	–	09/25/1995
IAD005279039	Electro-Coatings Inc.	Linn	Groundwater contamination by hexavalent chromium, with elevated levels of cadmium, nickel and other heavy metals. Groundwater VOC contamination attributed to neighboring industry. Groundwater contamination has not been detected in municipal drinking water wells.	06/24/1988	10/04/1989	09/14/2000	–	09/12/2019
IAD981124167	Fairfield Coal Gasification Plant	Jefferson	Groundwater contamination by PAHs (including anthracene and pyrene), VOCs (including benzene, toluene, and xylene), lead, mercury and cyanides.	06/24/1988	08/30/1990	08/24/1995	–	–
IAD022193577	Farmers' Mutual Cooperative	Sioux	Three city wells were closed because of groundwater contamination. Site groundwater was contaminated by several pesticides and carbon tetrachloride. Soil contamination by pesticides is not at levels that are a concern to health.	06/24/1988	08/30/1990	08/12/1998	–	11/13/2001
IA7213820445	Iowa Army Ammunition Plant	Des Moines	Surface water and groundwater contamination by explosives from munitions processing. Creek sediment contamination by explosives and lead.	07/14/1989	08/30/1990	–	–	–
IAD984591172	Iowa City former manufactured gas plant (FMGP)	Johnson County	soil and groundwater contamination with coal tar (benzene, toluene, ethylbenzene and xylenes, arsenic, cyanides and some metals	–	–	08/02/2010	–	–
IAD005291182	John Deere (Ottumwa Works Landfill)	Wapello	Low-level contamination of soil and sediments by heavy metals and methylene chloride from former disposal activities. Low-level heavy metal contamination of surface water.	06/24/1988	02/21/1990	08/28/1992	–	01/22/2001
IAD980631063	Labounty Site	Floyd	VOCs and arsenic leached into a groundwater aquifer that is used for drinking water supplies.	12/30/1982	09/08/1983	12/30/1988	–	01/06/1993
IAD000606038	Lawrence Todtz Farm	Clinton	Groundwater contamination by arsenic, barium, lead, other heavy metals, sodium, tetrahydrofuran, benzene, toluene and other VOCs from former waste disposal activities. Nearby wildlife and surface water may have been threatened by contamination.	09/18/1985	06/10/1986	09/11/1991	–	–
IAD005288634	Lehigh Portland Cement Co.	Cerro Gordo	Ground water on site became contaminated with heavy metals including arsenic, as well as elevated pH levels.	06/24/1988	08/30/1990	–	–	06/30/1993
IAD980969190	Mason City Coal Gasification Plant	Cerro Gordo	Soil, on-site waste, bedrock and groundwater contamination by PAHs. Creek sediments are also contaminated.	01/19/1994	12/16/1994	04/28/2008	–	–
IAD085824688	Mid-America Tanning Company	Woodbury	Soil, impounded sludges and surface water was contaminated with heavy metals, including chromium. Sludges contain elevated levels of hydrogen sulfide.	06/24/1988	03/31/1989	09/12/2000	–	09/24/2004
IAD069625655	Midwest Manufacturing/North Farm	Jasper	Groundwater contamination by VOCs such as vinyl chloride, TCE and DCE, cadmium and zinc from former electroplating operations. Site soils contain elevated levels of heavy metals.	09/18/1985	06/10/1986	02/18/1997	–	–
IAD980852461	Northwestern States Portland Cement Co.	Cerro Gordo	Groundwater had elevated pH and was contaminated by sulfates and sodium from former waste disposal practices, though drinking water wells were not affected. Sediments, soil and surface water had high pH considered caustic.	06/24/1988	08/30/1990	12/23/1993	–	08/31/1995
IAD980852578	Peoples Natural Gas Company	Dubuque	Groundwater and soil contamination by VOCs, phenols, PAHs, and inorganic compounds from process waste. Nearby wetlands and fish and wildlife refuge may be threatened by runoff.	06/24/1988	08/30/1990	09/28/2000	–	–
IA0001610963	Railroad Avenue Ground Water Contamination Site	Polk	Groundwater contamination by TCE, DCE and vinyl chloride. Several municipal water supply wells were contaminated and taken off-line but have now been returned to service after clean-up activities.	09/13/2001	09/05/2002	08/17/2007	–	–
IAD980632509	Red Oak City Landfill	Montgomery	Soil, groundwater and surface water contaminated by low concentrations of VOCs, including toluene and xylene, and heavy metals, including chromium, lead and barium from former landfilling practices. Nearby sediments contain toluene. Permeable soil makes groundwater contamination more likely.	06/10/1986	03/31/1989	06/21/2001	–	09/26/2005
IAD980630560	Shaw Avenue Dump	Floyd	Groundwater, soil and the Cedar River are contaminated by arsenic from disposal of arsenic-contaminated pharmaceutical manufacturing waste and sludge from a water treatment plant that received liquid waste from the same site.	09/18/1985	07/22/1987	03/30/2001	–	–
IAD980630750	Sheller-Globe Corp. Disposal	Lee	Waste material was formerly periodically burnt and the ash, which was contaminated with metals, was scattered over the site.	05/05/1989	08/30/1990	09/15/2000	–	09/24/2001
IAD980630487	Vogel Paint and Wax Company	Sioux	Soil contamination by VOCs and heavy metals including chromium and lead from former waste disposal practices. Groundwater contamination by VOCs, including benzene, ethyl benzene, ethyl methyl ketone, toluene and xylene, and metals.	10/15/1984	06/10/1986	08/19/1994	–	–
IAD984566356	Waterloo Coal Gasification Plant	Black Hawk	Soil and groundwater contamination by PAHs, benzene, ethylbenzene, toluene and xylene. There is a risk of impact on wetlands and wildlife.	10/14/1992	–	–	–	–
IAD065210734	White Farm Equipment Co. Dump	Floyd	Groundwater contamination by VOCs and heavy metals, including arsenic, chromium, copper, lead, nickel and zinc from former waste disposal practices. Sediments, soil and surface water also contain heavy metals. Local wetlands may have been at risk.	06/24/1988	08/30/1990	09/08/1995	–	10/30/2000

== See also ==
- List of Superfund sites in the United States
- List of environmental issues
- List of waste types
- TOXMAP
