= List of Superfund sites in New Mexico =

This is a list of Superfund sites in New Mexico designated under the Comprehensive Environmental Response, Compensation, and Liability Act (CERCLA) environmental law. The CERCLA federal law of 1980 authorized the United States Environmental Protection Agency (EPA) to create a list of polluted locations requiring a long-term response to clean up hazardous material contaminations. These locations are known as Superfund sites, and are placed on the National Priorities List (NPL).

The NPL guides the EPA in "determining which sites warrant further investigation" for environmental remediation. As of May 16, 2017, there were sixteen Superfund sites on the National Priorities List in New Mexico. In addition, four other sites have been cleaned up and removed from the list.

== Superfund sites ==
Proposed for addition to National Priorities List
Deleted from National Priorities List

CERCLIS ID	Name	County	Reason	Proposed	Listed	Construction completed	Partially deleted	Deleted
NMD980622864	AT&SF (Albuquerque)	Bernalillo	Groundwater contamination by dense, non-aqueous phase liquid containing organic compounds and soil contamination by PAHs and zinc from wood treatment plant which closed in 1972.	10/14/1992	12/16/1994	02/10/2011	03/02/2011	–
NMD043158591	AT&SF (Clovis)	Curry	Lake water, sediment and underlying soil was contaminated by boron, fluoride, chloride, phenolics, sulfate, petroleum hydrocarbons, dissolved solids and organic compounds.	06/23/1981	09/8/1983	09/20/2000	–	03/17/2003
NMD097960272	Cal West Metals (USSBA)	Socorro	Lead contamination of soil and battery casings from former operations on site.	06/24/1988	03/31/1989	09/28/1995	–	12/20/1996
NMD002899094	Chevron Questa Mine (formerly Molycorp Inc.)	Taos	An active molybdenum mine and milling facility has contaminated the shallow ground water and surface waters draining the site, such as the Red River, with acidic, metal-laden waters due to mining operations and breakages in the tailings transfer pipe. The principal contaminants are aluminum, arsenic, cadmium, chromium, cobalt, fluoride, iron, lead, manganese, molybdenum, sulfate and zinc.	05/11/2000	09/16/2011	–	–	–
NMD980749378	Cimarron Mining Corp.	Lincoln	Groundwater contamination by inorganic compounds including cyanides and lead contamination of soil and sediment, from ore milling and precious metals extraction.	06/24/1988	10/04/1989	09/24/1992	08/31/2000	–
NMD981155930	Cleveland Mill	Grant	Soil and groundwater contamination by arsenic, beryllium, cadmium, lead and zinc from former mining and milling operations. Runoff has acidified the Little Walnut Creek and contaminated it with metals.	06/24/1988	03/31/1989	09/23/1999	–	07/23/2001
NMD001829506	Eagle Picher Carefree Batteries	Socorro	Groundwater contamination with TCE and DCE and soil contamination by lead, chromium and cadmium from former electronics and battery manufacture and municipal landfill.	03/07/2007	09/19/2007	–	–	–
NMD986668911	Fruit Avenue Plume	Bernalillo	TCE contamination of groundwater, possibly from a former dry cleaning operation, in an aquifer that provides drinking water to Albuquerque.	07/22/1999	10/22/1999	12/05/2006	–	–
NM0007271768	Grants Chlorinated Solvents Plume	Cibola	Groundwater contamination by PCE, with the possibility of vapor intrusion in buildings.	03/08/2004	07/22/2004	09/11/2012	–	–
NMD0002271286	Griggs & Walnut Ground Water Plume	Doña Ana	Groundwater, including that drawn by municipal wells, is contaminated by PCE.	01/11/2001	06/14/2001	07/20/2012	–	–
NMD007860935	Homestake Mining Company	Cibola	Groundwater contamination by radium-226, selenium, uranium and radon from alkaline tailings from uranium ore milling.	12/30/1982	09/08/1983	09/20/1996	–	–
NMN000607033	Jackpile-Paguate Uranium Mine	Cibola		03/2012	12/12/2013	–	–	–
NMN000607057	Lea and West Second Street	Chaves	Soil and groundwater contamination by PCE, TCE, and 1,2-DCE.		04/07/2016	–	–	–
NMD980750020	Lee Acres Landfill (USDOI )	San Juan	Groundwater contamination by high concentrations of manganese and lower concentrations of nickel and VOCs including PCE and its decomposition products.	06/24/1998	08/30/1990	08/11/2005	–	–
NM0000605386	McGaffey & Main Ground Water Plume	Chaves	Groundwater contamination by PCE, believed to be from a former dry cleaning operation. Contamination has not affected the city water supply.	09/13/2001	09/05/2002	–	–	–
NMD986670156	North Railroad Avenue Plume	Rio Arriba	Groundwater contamination by PCE.	07/28/1998	01/19/1999	06/30/2008	–	–
NMD980749980	Pagano Salvage	Valencia	Soil was contaminated by PCBs.	06/24/1988	10/04/1989	09/12/1991	–	10/14/1992
NMD980622773	Prewitt Abandoned Refinery	McKinley	Petroleum sludges. Soil contamination by asbestos, lead and polycyclic aromatic hydrocarbons (PAHs) and groundwater contamination by lead, benzene, toluene, ethylbenzene and xylenes.	06/24/1988	08/30/1990	08/22/1996	01/29/1998	–
NMD980745558	South Valley	Bernalillo	Groundwater contamination by VOCs. Private and municipal wells were affected.	07/23/1982	09/08/1983	09/30/1996	–	–
NMD030443303	United Nuclear Corp. Church Rock	McKinley	Groundwater contamination by acidic mill tailings, sulfate, thorium, radium, aluminum, ammonia and iron from former uranium ore milling operations.	12/30/1982	09/08/1983	09/29/1998	–	–

== See also ==
- List of Superfund sites in the United States
- List of environmental issues
- List of waste types
- TOXMAP
