= List of Superfund sites in Delaware =

This is a list of Superfund sites in Delaware designated under the Comprehensive Environmental Response, Compensation, and Liability Act (CERCLA) environmental law. The CERCLA federal law of 1980 authorized the United States Environmental Protection Agency (EPA) to create a list of polluted locations requiring a long-term response to clean up hazardous material contaminations. These locations are known as Superfund sites, and are placed on the National Priorities List (NPL).

The NPL guides the EPA in "determining which sites warrant further investigation" for environmental remediation. As of December 16, 2010, there were 14 Superfund sites on the National Priorities List in Delaware. One additional site has been proposed for entry on the list. Six sites have been cleaned up and removed from the list.

== Superfund sites ==
Proposed for addition to National Priorities List
Deleted from National Priorities List

CERCLIS ID	Name	County	Reason	Proposed	Listed	Construction completed	Partially deleted	Deleted
DED980714141	Chem-Solv, Inc.	Kent		01/22/1987	08/30/1990	06/30/1998	N/A	N/A
DED980704860	Coker's Sanitation Service Landfills	Kent		04/10/1985	07/22/1987	09/29/1993	N/A	N/A
DE8570024010	Dover Air Force Base	Kent		10/15/1984	03/13/1989	09/27/2006	N/A	N/A
DED980693550	Dover Gas Light Company	Kent		01/22/1987	10/04/1989	N/A	N/A	N/A
DED980705545	Tyler Refrigeration Pit	Kent						
DED980704951	Wildcat Landfill	Kent						
DED980494496	Army Creek Landfill	New Castle		12/30/1982	09/08/1983	04/29/1994	N/A	N/A
DED980551667	Delaware City PVC Plant	New Castle						
DED000605972	Delaware Sand & Gravel Landfill	New Castle						
DED980555122	E.I. Du Pont de Nemours & Co., Inc. (Newport Pigment Plant Landfill)	New Castle						
DED980830954	Halby Chemical	New Castle						
DED980713093	Harvey & Knott Drum, Inc.	New Castle						
DED980552244	Koppers Co., Inc. (Newport Plant)	New Castle		10/26/1989	08/30/1990	N/A	N/A	N/A
DED058980442	New Castle Spill	New Castle		12/30/1982	09/08/1983	07/19/1992	N/A	06/12/1996
DED980705255	New Castle Steel	New Castle						
DED981035520	Sealand Limited	New Castle						
DED041212473	Standard Chlorine of Delaware, Inc.	New Castle		09/18/1985	07/22/1987	N/A	N/A	N/A
DED000606079	Tybouts Corner Landfill	New Castle						
DED043958388	NCR Corp. (Millsboro Plant)	Sussex						
DEN000306645	Millsboro TCE	Sussex		09/23/2009	N/A	N/A	N/A	N/A
DED980494637	Sussex County Landfill No. 5	Sussex						

== See also ==
- Fox Point State Park
- List of Superfund sites in the United States
- List of environmental issues
- List of waste types
- TOXMAP
