= List of Superfund sites in South Dakota =

This is a list of Superfund sites in South Dakota designated under the Comprehensive Environmental Response, Compensation, and Liability Act (CERCLA) environmental law. The CERCLA federal law of 1980 authorized the United States Environmental Protection Agency (EPA) to create a list of polluted locations requiring a long-term response to clean up hazardous material contaminations. These locations are known as Superfund sites, and are placed on the National Priorities List (NPL). The NPL guides the EPA in "determining which sites warrant further investigation" for environmental remediation.

As of March 26, 2010, there were two Superfund sites on the National Priorities List in South Dakota. No sites are currently proposed for entry on the list. Two sites have been cleaned up and removed from the NPL.

== Superfund sites ==
Deleted from National Priorities List

CERCLIS ID	Name	County	Reason	Proposed	Listed	Construction completed	Partially deleted	Deleted
SDD987673985	Gilt Edge Mine	Lawrence	Sulfide waste rock and exposed ore zones contain heavy metals, including arsenic, cadmium, chromium, copper, lead, nickel, silver and zinc. These heavy metals, in addition to cobalt and manganese, have been found in Strawberry Creek. Elevated nitrates and sulfates are also present in heap leach residues.	05/11/2000	12/01/2000	–	–	–
SDD980717136	Whitewood Creek	Lawrence	Heavy metals, including arsenic, cadmium, copper, silver, mercury and cyanide contaminate soil, ground water, and surface water.	12/30/1982	09/08/1983	09/25/1992	–	08/13/1996
SD2571924644	Ellsworth Air Force Base	Meade and Pennington	On-site shallow monitoring wells downgradient from the landfills and burn pit are contaminated with 1,1-dichloroethane, 1,2-dichloroethylene, trichloroethylene, arsenic, and chromium.	10/26/1989	08/30/1990	09/10/1999	12/04/2006	–
SDD000823559	Williams Pipe Line Co. Disposal Pit	Minnehaha	Sediment in the 7 foot deep unlined pit measuring 9 feet by 9 feet contains barium, beryllium, chromium, copper, iron, lead, zinc, benzene, toluene, xylene, polynuclear aromatic hydrocarbons, and pesticides. Ground water near the pit is contaminated with 4,4'-DDD, 4,4'-DDT, gamma-chlordane, beta-BHC, and lead.	10/26/1989	08/30/1990	09/29/1994	–	04/02/1999

== See also ==
- List of Superfund sites in the United States
- List of environmental issues
- List of waste types
- TOXMAP

== Sources ==
- EPA list of proposed Superfund sites in South Dakota
- EPA list of current Superfund sites in South Dakota
- EPA list of Superfund site construction completions in South Dakota
- EPA list of partially deleted Superfund sites in South Dakota
- EPA list of deleted Superfund sites in South Dakota
