= List of Superfund sites in Utah =

This is a list of Superfund sites in Utah designated under the Comprehensive Environmental Response, Compensation, and Liability Act (CERCLA) environmental law. The CERCLA federal law of 1980 authorized the United States Environmental Protection Agency (EPA) to create a list of polluted locations requiring a long-term response to clean up hazardous material contaminations. These locations are known as Superfund sites, and are placed on the National Priorities List (NPL). The NPL guides the EPA in "determining which sites warrant further investigation" for environmental remediation. As of May 1, 2010, there were sixteen Superfund sites on the National Priorities List in Utah. Three more sites have been proposed for entry on the list and four others have been cleaned up and removed from it.

== Superfund sites ==
Proposed for addition to National Priorities List
Deleted from National Priorities List

CERCLIS ID	Name	County	Reason	Proposed	Listed	Construction completed	Partially deleted	Deleted
UT0001119296	Bountiful/Woods Cross PCE Plume	Davis	Groundwater contamination by VOCs, primarily PCE and TCE, from petroleum distribution and dry cleaning companies.	12/01/2000	09/13/2001	–	–	–
UTD988075719	Davenport and Flagstaff Smelters	Salt Lake	Soil contamination by lead and arsenic from smelting.	12/01/2000	04/30/2003	–	10/19/2004	–
UT0002240158	Eureka Mills	Juab	Soil contamination by lead and arsenic from mining and milling.	06/14/2001	09/05/2002	–	–	–
UTN000802654	Five Points PCE Plume	Davis	Groundwater contamination by PCE from an unknown source.	03/07/2007	09/19/2007	–	–	–
UT0571724350	Hill Air Force Base	Davis and Weber	Air, soil and groundwater contamination by VOCs, chromium, cadmium, manganese and arsenic from Air Force maintenance activities.	10/15/1984	07/22/1987	–	–	–
UT0001277359	Intermountain Waste Oil Refinery	Davis	Stored waste and solvent contamination of soil and groundwater.	10/12/1999	05/11/2000	10/01/2004	–	–
UTD093120921	International Smelting and Refining	Tooele	Arsenic, cadmium, copper, lead, mercury and zinc contamination of soil.	04/23/1999	07/27/2000	09/27/2007	–	–
UT0002391472	Jacobs Smelter	Tooele	Lead and arsenic contamination of soil.	07/22/1999	02/04/2000	–	09/04/2001 11/29/2005	–
UTD070926811	Kennecott (North Zone)	Salt Lake	Soil, groundwater, surface water and sludge contaminated by lead, arsenic and selenium from ore smelting and processing.	01/18/1994	Deferred	–	–	–
UTD081834277	Midvale Slag	Salt Lake	Soil, air, ground water, surface water, sediment and solid waste contaminated by lead, arsenic, chromium and cadmium from smelting.	06/10/1986	02/11/1991	–	–	–
UT3890090035	Monticello Mill Tailings (DOE)	San Juan	Soil, groundwater, surface water, sediment and solid waste contaminated by uranium, thorium-230, radium-226, radon-222 and heavy metals including arsenic, selenium, vanadium, molybdenum and manganese from uranium milling operations associated with the Manhattan Project.	07/14/1989	11/21/1989	09/29/2004	10/14/2003	–
UTD980667208	Monticello Radioactive Contaminated Properties	San Juan	Debris and soil and air contamination by radioactive dust and tailings from the Minticello Mill, and radon from radioactive decay.	10/15/1989	06/10/1986	09/02/1999	–	02/28/2000
UTD980951420	Murray Smelter	Salt Lake	Groundwater, surface water, soil, sediment and debris contaminated by lead and arsenic from former ASARCO smelter.	01/18/1994	–	–	–	–
UT9210020922	Ogden Defense Depot (DLA)	Weber	Debris; groundwater contamination contaminated by VOCs; soil contamination by semi-volatile compounds, metals including arsenic, lead, zinc, cadmium, mercury and barium and pesticides.	10/15/1984	07/22/1987	09/28/1995	–	–
UTD093119196	Petrochem Recycling Corp./Ekotek Plant	Salt Lake	Liquid waste, debris and residuals; groundwater, surface water and soil contamination by oil refining and recycling wastes, PCBs and acidic sludge. An owner and an operator of the plant were subsequently convicted of environmental crimes.	07/29/1991	10/14/1992	04/12/2000	–	06/30/2003
UTD980718670	Portland Cement	Salt Lake	Debris and soil, air groundwater contamination from arsenic, lead, chromium, cadmium and molybdenum contained in cement kiln dust dumped on site.	10/15/1984	06/10/1986	08/18/1998	–	–
UTD980952840	Richardson Flat Tailings	Summit	Groundwater, surface water and air contamination by arsenic, cadmium, copper, lead, mercury, silver and zinc from mining and milling.	02/07/1992	–	–	–	–
UTD980635452	Rose Park Sludge Pit	Salt Lake	Solid waste and soil contamination from dumped acidic petroleum refinery waste sludge containing PAHs and sulfur dioxide, with potential for groundwater contamination.	12/30/1982	09/18/1983	06/17/1992	–	06/03/2003
UTD980951388	Sharon Steel Corporation (Midvale Tailings)	Salt Lake	Liquid waste and air, surface water, groundwater and soil contamination by lead, arsenic, iron, manganese, zinc and other heavy metals. Local residents had been using tailings from the site for gardening and children's sandboxes.	10/15/1984	08/30/1994	05/12/1999	–	09/24/2004
UT3213820894	Tooele Army Depot (North Area)	Tooele	Solid waste, debris and groundwater and soil contamination by explosives, lead, cadmium, barium, pesticides, hydrocarbons, solvents, waste oils and PCBs from maintenance, munitions disposal and other industrial activities.	10/15/1984	08/30/1990	–	–	–
UTN000802704	U.S. Magnesium	Tooele	Largely uncontrolled release of heavy metals, acidic waste, PCBs, dioxins, furans, HCB and PAHs into the air, soil, surface water, and groundwater.	09/03/2008	11/04/2009	–	–	–
UTD980667240	Utah Power & Light/American Barrel Co.	Salt Lake	Soil and groundwater contamination by PAHs, benzene, styrene, toluene, xylene, lead, pesticides and cyanides from wood treatment, coal gasification and barrel storage.	05/05/1989	10/04/1989	09/30/1996	–	–
UTD000716399	Wasatch Chemical Co.	Salt Lake	Liquid and solid waste; air, surface water, groundwater and soil contamination by herbicides, pesticides and VOCs including xylene and toluene.	01/22/1987	02/11/1991	09/30/1997	–	–

== See also ==
- List of Superfund sites in the United States
- List of environmental issues
- List of waste types
- TOXMAP
