= List of Superfund sites in Maine =

This is a list of Superfund sites in Maine designated under the Comprehensive Environmental Response, Compensation, and Liability Act (CERCLA) environmental law. The CERCLA federal law of 1980 authorized the United States Environmental Protection Agency (EPA) to create a list of polluted locations requiring a long-term response to clean up hazardous material contaminations. These locations are known as Superfund sites, and are placed on the National Priorities List (NPL).

The NPL guides the EPA in "determining which sites warrant further investigation" for environmental remediation. As of November 29, 2010, there were 12 Superfund sites on the National Priorities List in Maine. No additional sites are currently proposed for entry on the list. Three sites have been cleaned up and removed from the list.

== Superfund sites ==
Deleted from National Priorities List

| CERCLIS ID | Name | County | Reason | Proposed | Listed | Construction completed | Partially deleted | Deleted |
|---|---|---|---|---|---|---|---|---|
| ME9570024522 | Loring Air Force Base | Aroostook | Groundwater is contaminated with volatile organic compounds (VOCs) such as trichloroethylene (TCE), and fuel-related compounds, including benzene and toluene. Soils contain significant amounts of fuel, oil, polynuclear aromatic hydrocarbons (PAHs), PCBs, and various VOCs. Surface water and sediment contaminated with VOCs, PCBs, PAHs, and heavy metals. | Jul 14, 1989 | Feb 21, 1990 | Mar 23, 2001 | – | – |
| MED980732291 | Pinette's Salvage Yard | Aroostook | 900 to 1,000 gallons of dielectrical fluids from Loring containing polychlorinated biphenyls (PCBs) spilled directly onto the ground. The oil migrated through the soil and contaminated groundwater and surface water. | Dec 30, 1982 | Sep 8, 1983 | Jun 3, 1997 | – | Sep 30, 2002 |
| ME8170022018 | Brunswick Naval Air Station | Cumberland | Wastes and chemicals from pesticides, ordnance, firefighting foam, and uncapped landfill. | Oct 15, 1984 | Jul 22, 1987 | Sep 27, 2002 | – | – |
| MED980524078 | McKin Co. | Cumberland | soil and water contamination from 1965 liquid waste storage and incinerator | Dec 30, 1982 | Sep 8, 1983 | Mar 24, 1992 | – | – |
| MED980524128 | Callahan Mine | Hancock | soil and water contamination from mining tailings. | Sep 13, 2001 | Sep 5, 2002 | – | – | – |
| MED980731475 | O'Connor Co. | Kennebec | soil and water contamination from salvage and electrical transformer recycling business. | Dec 30, 1982 | Sep 8, 1983 | Sep 26, 2002 | – | Jul 22, 2014 |
| MED980504435 | Winthrop Landfill | Kennebec | soil and water contamination from landfill since the 1930s, more than 3 million gallons of chemical wastes, mostly complex organic compounds including resins, plasticizers, solvents and other chemicals | Dec 30, 1982 | Sep 8, 1983 | Dec 23, 1997 | – | – |
| MED042143883 | Union Chemical Co., Inc. | Knox | soil and water contamination from 1967 paint and coating strippers manufacture, 1969 handling and recovering petrochemical-based solvents, 1979 incinerator to burn contaminated sludge | Jun 24, 1988 | Oct 4, 1989 | Sep 30, 1997 | – | Sep 21, 2018 |
| MED980915474 | Eastland Woolen Mill | Penobscot | soil and water contamination from manufacturer and finisher (dyeing) of wool and fabric with biphenyl and chlorinated benzene compounds. Liquid wastes discharged to ground beneath mill buildings until 1977. | Apr 23, 1999 | Jul 22, 1999 | Sep 28, 2006 | Oct 1, 2012 | – |
| MED985466168 | West Site/Hows Corners | Penobscot | soil and groundwater contamination with perchloroethylene (PCE) and other contaminants from Portland/Bangor Waste Oil Company (1965 to 1980) | Feb 13, 1995 | Sep 29, 1995 | – | – | – |
| MED981073711 | Eastern Surplus | Washington | soil and groundwater incl. Dennys River contaminated with hazardous chemicals like calcium carbide, polychlorinated biphenyls and volatile organic compounds from retailer of army surplus and salvage items (from 1946 to the early 1980s) | Oct 2, 1995 | Jun 17, 1996 | Sep 25, 2001 | – | – |
| ME7170022019 | Portsmouth Naval Shipyard | York | Contamination in groundwater, soils, and sediments with polychlorinated biphenyls (PCBs), polycyclic aromatic hydrocarbon (PAHs), metals and benzene from shipbuilding and submarine repair work since 1917, landfill operations, spills and leaks from industrial operations and piping, storage of batteries and other materials, filling of land, and outfalls to the river. | Jun 23, 1993 | May 31, 1994 | – | – | – |
| MED980504393 | Saco Municipal Landfill | York | Soil and groundwater contamination from tannery sludge containing chromium and other heavy metals, and volatile organic compounds on Saco Municipal Landfill since 1960 | Jun 24, 1988 | Feb 21, 1990 | Sep 29, 2000 | – | – |
| MED980520241 | Saco Tannery Waste Pits | York | Disposal area for process wastes such as chromium sludges, acid wastes, methylene chloride and caustic substances. | Dec 30, 1982 | Sep 8, 1983 | Sep 30, 1993 | – | Sep 29, 1999 |

== See also ==
- List of Superfund sites in the United States
- List of environmental issues
- List of waste types
- TOXMAP
