= List of Superfund sites in Montana =

This is a list of Superfund sites in Montana designated under the Comprehensive Environmental Response, Compensation, and Liability Act (CERCLA) environmental law. The CERCLA federal law of 1980 authorized the United States Environmental Protection Agency (EPA) to create a list of polluted locations requiring a long-term response to clean up hazardous material contaminations. These locations are known as Superfund sites, and are placed on the National Priorities List (NPL). The NPL guides the EPA in "determining which sites warrant further investigation" for environmental remediation. As of March 10, 2011, there were 16 Superfund sites on the National Priorities List in Montana. One additional site has been proposed for entry on the list. No sites have yet been removed from the list following clean up.

== Superfund sites ==
Proposed for addition to National Priorities List

| CERCLIS ID | Name | County | Reason | Proposed | Listed | Construction completed | Partially deleted | Deleted |
|---|---|---|---|---|---|---|---|---|
| MTD093291599 | Anaconda Copper Mine Smelter and Refinery | Cascade | Soil and surface water contamination by arsenic, lead and other heavy metals. | 04/03/2010 | 03/10/2011 | – | – | – |
| MTD093291656 | Anaconda Co. Smelter Site | Deer Lodge | Soil and groundwater contamination by arsenic, copper, cadmium, lead and zinc. | 12/30/1982 | 09/08/1983 | – | – | – |
| MTD982572562 | Basin Mining Area | Jefferson | Mine wastes contaminated Basin and Cataract Creeks and the soils within the town of Basin. Contaminants include arsenic, cadmium, copper, lead and other metals. | 07/22/1999 | 10/22/1999 | – | – | – |
| MT6122307485 | Barker Hughesville Mining District | Cascade and Judith Basin | Ground water, sediment, surface water, and soils are contaminated with metals including zinc and arsenic. | 12/1/2000 | 09/13/2001 | – | – | – |
| MTD986066025 | Burlington Northern Livingston Shop Complex | Park | Petroleum hydrocarbons and volatile organic compounds have contaminated the soil and the Livingston Aquifer. | 08/23/1994 | – | – | – | – |
| MT0001096353 | Carpenter-Snow Creek Mining District | Cascade | Groundwater, soil and watercourse contamination by arsenic and heavy metals. | 12/1/2000 | 09/13/2001 | – | – | – |
| MTD006230346 | East Helena | Lewis and Clark | Soil, surface water and groundwater contamination by lead, other heavy metals and arsenic at ASARCO lead smelter. | 09/08/1983 | 09/21/1984 | – | – | – |
| MT0012694970 | Flat Creek IMM | Mineral | Soil, groundwater and surface water contamination by arsenic, antimony, lead and manganese from mine tailings, some of which was used as fill and construction material in the nearby town of Superior. | 04/09/2009 | 09/23/2009 | – | – | – |
| MTD006232276 | Idaho Pole | Gallatin | Groundwater, sediment, surface water and soil contamination by PCP, PAHs and dioxins from wood treatment plant. | 10/15/1984 | 06/10/1986 | 03/26/1998 | – | – |
| MT0009083840 | Libby Asbestos | Lincoln | Asbestos contamination from vermiculite processing plants. | 02/26/2002 | 10/24/2002 | – | – | – |
| MTD980502736 | Libby Ground Water | Lincoln | Groundwater, sediment, surface water and soil contamination by PCP, PAHs and heavy metals from the wood and paper industry. | 12/30/1982 | 09/08/1983 | 09/20/1993 | – | – |
| MT0007623052 | Lockwood Solvents | Yellowstone | Groundwater, sediment, surface water and soil contamination by VOCs. | 05/11/2000 | 12/01/2000 | – | – | – |
| MTD980717565 | Milltown Reservoir Sediments | Missoula | Groundwater and reservoir sediments contamination by arsenic and copper from historic mining activity. | 12/30/1982 | 09/08/1983 | – | – | – |
| MTD006230635 | Montana Pole | Silver Bow | Groundwater, sediment, surface water and soil contamination by PCP, PAHs, dioxins, and furans from wood treatment. | 06/10/1986 | 07/22/1987 | 09/27/2001 | – | – |
| MTD021997689 | Mouat Industries | Stillwater | Soils and groundwater were contaminated with hexavalent chromium. | 10/15/1984 | 06/10/1986 | 09/27/1996 | proposed 03/24/2009 | – |
| MTD980502777 | Silver Bow Creek/Butte | Silver Bow | Groundwater, surface water and soil are contaminated with arsenic, copper, zinc, cadmium, and lead from mining and smelting. Silver Bow Creek and the Clark Fork River contain metals from the cities of Butte to Milltown. Mine tailings in the creek and river have caused fish kills in the river. | 12/30/1982 | 09/08/1983 | – | – | – |
| MTSFN7578012 | Upper Tenmile Creek | Lewis and Clark | Heavy metal and arsenic contamination from mining. | 07/22/1999 | 10/22/1999 | – | – | – |

== See also ==
- List of Superfund sites in the United States
- List of environmental issues
- List of waste types
- TOXMAP
