= List of Superfund sites in Rhode Island =

This is a list of Superfund sites in Rhode Island designated under the Comprehensive Environmental Response, Compensation, and Liability Act (CERCLA) environmental law. The CERCLA federal law of 1980 authorized the United States Environmental Protection Agency (EPA) to create a list of polluted locations requiring a long-term response to clean up hazardous material contaminations. These locations are known as Superfund sites, and are placed on the National Priorities List (NPL).

The NPL guides the EPA in "determining which sites warrant further investigation" for environmental remediation. As of November 29, 2010, there were 12 Superfund sites on the National Priorities List in Rhode Island. No additional sites are currently proposed for entry on the list. One site has been cleaned up and removed from the list.

== Superfund sites ==
Proposed for addition to National Priorities List
Deleted from National Priorities List

CERCLIS ID	Name	County	Reason	Proposed	Listed	Construction completed	Partially deleted	Deleted
RID980579056	Picillo Farm	Kent		12/30/1982	09/08/1983	09/03/2003	–	–
RI6170085470	Newport Naval Education/Training Center	Newport		07/14/1989	11/21/1989	–	–	–
RID980520183	Central Landfill	Providence		10/15/1984	06/10/1986	09/28/2006	–	–
RID981203755	Centredale Manor Restoration Project	Providence		10/22/1999	02/04/2000	–	–	–
RID980731459	Davis (GSR) Landfill	Providence	On-site groundwater, surface water, and sediments contaminated with volatile organic compounds such as vinyl chloride and benzene; polycyclic aromatic hydrocarbons; heavy metals including manganese, arsenic, lead; and the pesticides chlordane and dichlorodiphenyltrichloroethane (DDT).	04/10/1985	06/10/1986	09/29/1997	–	08/13/1999
RID980523070	Davis Liquid Waste	Providence		12/30/1982	09/08/1983	–	–	–
RID093212439	Landfill & Resource Recovery, Inc. (L&RR)	Providence		12/30/1982	09/08/1983	02/24/1997	–	–
RID055176283	Peterson/Puritan, Inc.	Providence		12/30/1982	09/08/1983	–	05/09/2005	–
RID980731442	Stamina Mills, Inc.	Providence		12/30/1982	09/08/1983	08/09/2000	–	–
RID009764929	Western Sand & Gravel	Providence		12/30/1982	09/08/1983	12/22/1992	–	–
RI6170022036	Davisville Naval Construction Battalion Center	Washington		07/14/1989	11/21/1989	–	–	–
RID980521025	Rose Hill Regional Landfill	Washington		06/24/1988	10/04/1989	09/26/2008	–	–
RID981063993	West Kingston Town Dump/URI Disposal Area	Washington		07/29/1991	10/14/1992	09/29/2009	–	–

== See also ==
- List of Superfund sites in the United States
- List of environmental issues
- List of waste types
- TOXMAP
