= List of Superfund sites in Nevada =

This is a list of Superfund sites in Nevada designated under the Comprehensive Environmental Response, Compensation, and Liability Act (CERCLA) environmental law. The CERCLA federal law of 1980 authorized the United States Environmental Protection Agency (EPA) to create a list of polluted locations requiring a long-term response to clean up hazardous material contaminations. These locations are known as Superfund sites, and are placed on the National Priorities List (NPL).

The NPL guides the EPA in "determining which sites warrant further investigation" for environmental remediation. As of November 29, 2010, there was one Superfund site on the National Priorities List in Nevada, with no further sites proposed for addition. No site has yet been removed from the list.

== Superfund sites ==
Not on National Priorities List

CERCLIS ID	Name	County	Reason	Proposed	Listed	Construction completed	Partially deleted	Deleted
NVD980813646	Carson River Mercury Site	Lyon, Storey, and Churchill	Surface water, sediment, soil, fish and wildlife contamination by mercury from historical gold and silver mining operations.	10/26/1989	08/30/1990	–	–	–
NVD083917252	Anaconda Mine	Lyon	groundwater and surface water contamination by a wide range of heavy metals, radioisotopes, chlorides, sulfates and acidic conditions. Fugitive dust from contaminated mine tailings is also a threat.	–	–	–	–	–
NV3141190030	Rio Tinto Copper Mine	Elko	copper, iron, manganese, zinc.	–	–	–	–	–

== See also ==
- List of Superfund sites in the United States
- List of environmental issues
- List of waste types
- TOXMAP
