= List of Superfund sites in Washington, D.C. =

This is a list of Superfund sites in Washington, DC designated under the Comprehensive Environmental Response, Compensation, and Liability Act.

CERCLIS ID	Name	Reason	Proposed	Listed	Construction completed	Partially deleted	Deleted
DC9170024310	Washington Navy Yard		03/06/1998	07/28/1998	N/A	N/A	N/A

== See also ==
- List of Superfund sites in the United States
- List of environmental issues
- List of waste types
- TOXMAP
