= Environmental issues in Hawaii =

Hawaii is an island in the Pacific Ocean 2,000 mi (3,200 km) off the coast of the United States.

The majority of environmental issues affecting Hawaii today are related to pressures from increasing human and animal population, as well as urban expansion both directly on the islands and from overseas. These issues include the unsustainable impacts of tourism, urbanization, climate change implications such as sea level rise, pollution (especially marine plastic pollution), and invasive species.

== Water quality ==
The waters surrounding the Hawaiian Islands are affected by increasing waste products like marine debris from land and ocean sources washing onto shore as well as effluents generated and released from the islands themselves. Oceans in particular are being devastated by factors including marine debris, plastic pollution, and tourism.

=== Marine debris ===
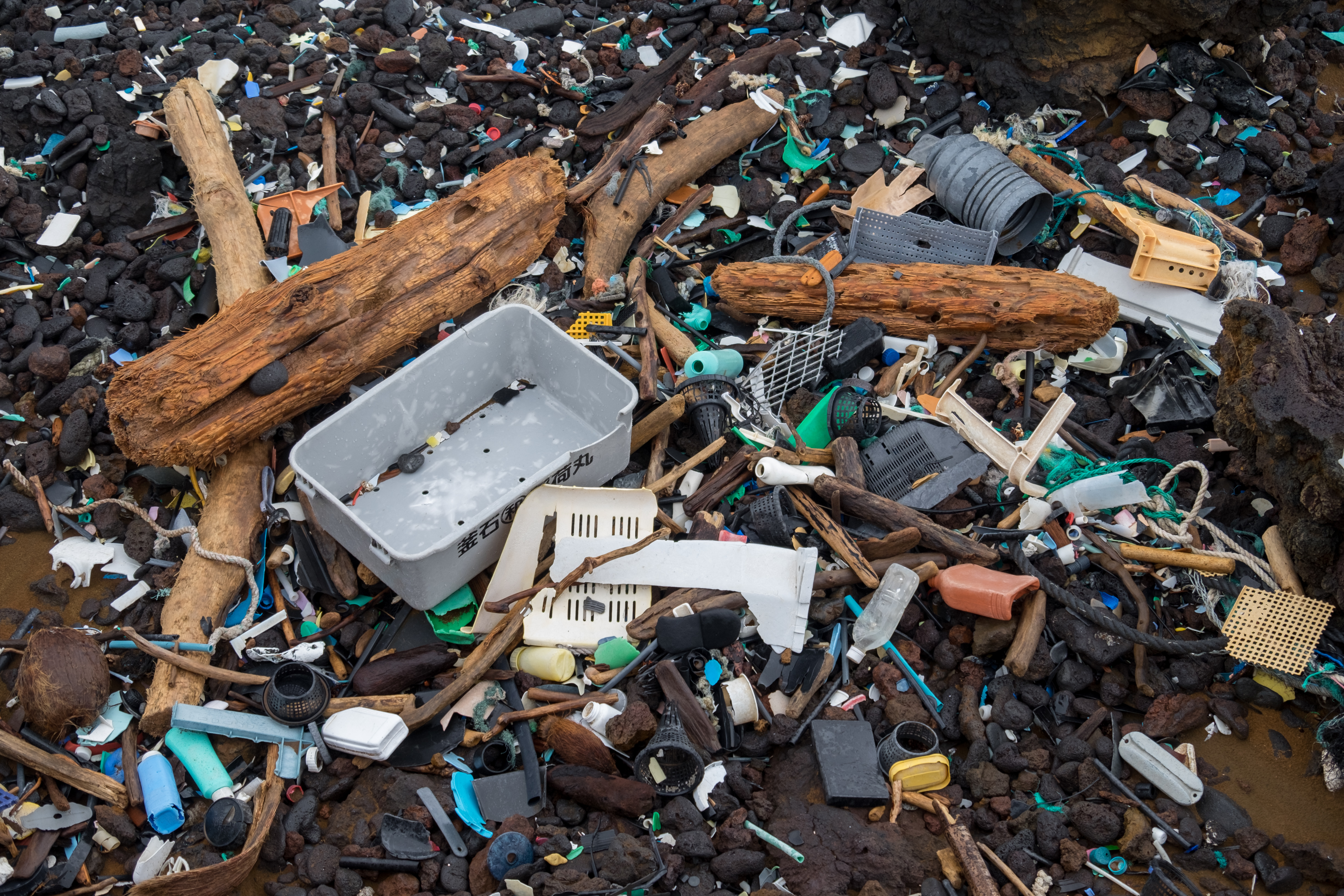
Waste from the Great Pacific Garbage Patch washed ashore at the south end of Hawaii.

The positioning of Hawaii in particular makes it a high-impact target for marine debris, given the natural ocean currents and its relative location to the North Pacific Subtropical Convergence Zone. As a result, marine debris is not limited to waste from the islands exclusively but is also carried from other locations around the world. Several organizations, both government and non-government agencies have taken initiatives to counter the environmental impacts of debris carried onto shore through clean-up efforts. The National Oceanic and Atmospheric Administration, which performs under the United States Department of Commerce, has "led this mission every year since 1996, removing a total of 904 tons of marine debris" as of 2014.

=== Plastic pollution ===
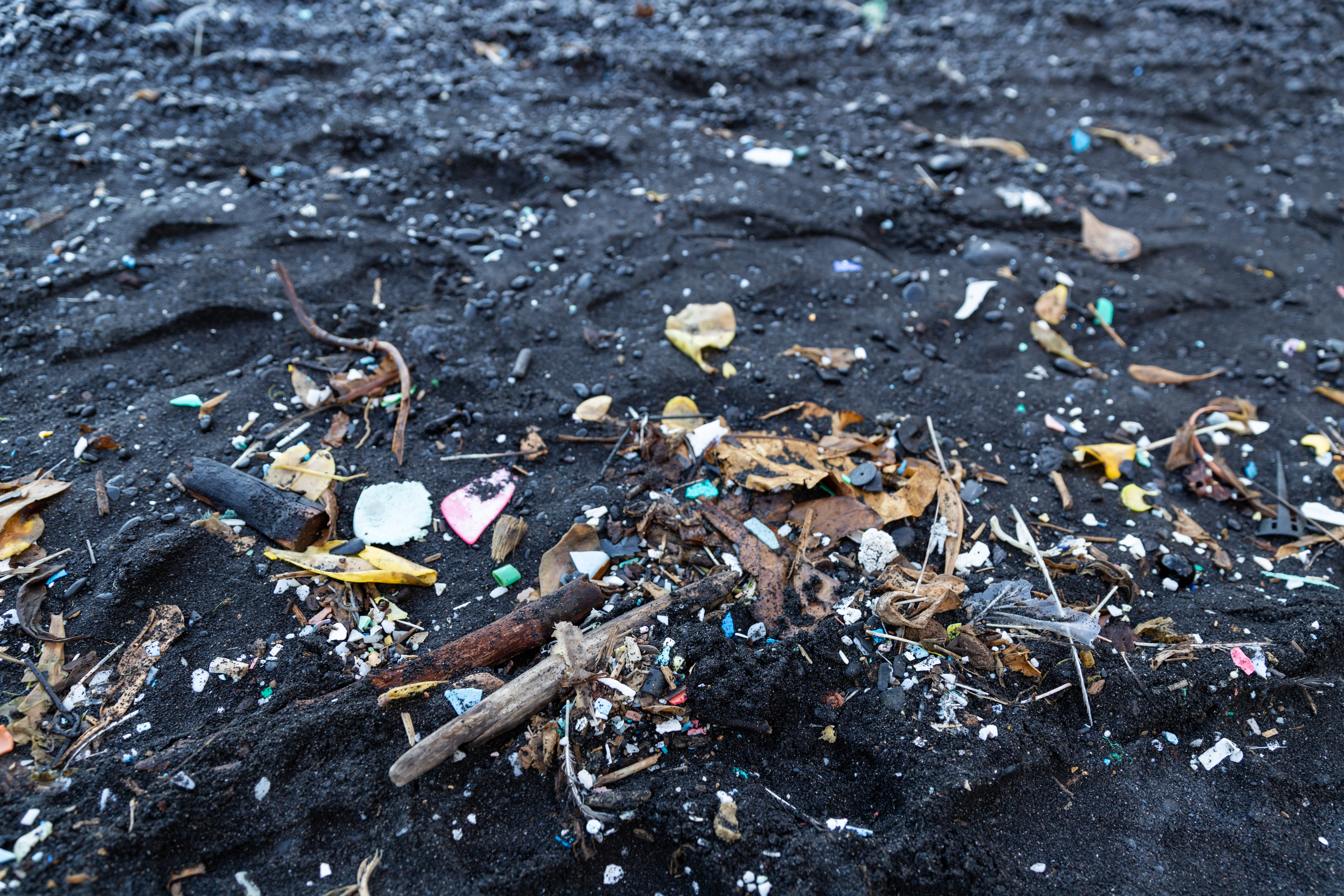
Pacific Garbage, Black sand beach, Maui, Hawaii

Although plastic pollution remains under the umbrella of "marine debris", it is one of the largest concerns affecting marine life and the most ubiquitous source of pollution across the oceans. In a 2014 study, the "first study that compares all sizes of floating plastic in the world's oceans from the largest items to small microplastics," researchers estimated that a minimum of 5.25 trillion plastic particles exist in the ocean. Historically, the U.S. military used the ocean as a dumping ground for munitions from 1919 to 1970, and the U.S. army dumped 16,000 mustard gas bombs in deep water (south of Pearl Harbor after World War II.) Presently, floating plastic garbage from disposable consumer products accumulate in the Great Pacific Garbage Patch, from debris eventually find its way onto the reefs and beaches in Hawaii. Kamilo Beach, located at the southern tip of the Big Island, has been devastated by plastic pollution from the patch and was named "The Dirtiest Beach in the World" by the British Broadcasting Company (BBC). Unique to this site is the abundance of both microplastic and meso-plastic, where geologists found plastic-infused rocks called "plastiglomerates"; they expect this new rock become a part of the fossil record, indicating the intensity of human influence on the environment. Plastiglomerates are formed when "melted plastic binds together sand, shells, pebbles, basalt, coral and wood, or seeps into the cavities of larger rocks to form a rock-plastic hybrid"; although they were not discovered until 2012 by Captain Charles Moore from Algalita Marine Research Institute, plastiglomerates occur in other parts of the world, in part by fire-using activities such as bonfires.

The presence of plastic is harmful to marine life, including seabirds, that often get entangled in plastic or mistake plastics as food sources and consume them. Studies show that ingestion can block gastric enzyme secretion, diminish feeding stimulus, lower hormone levels, and lead to reproductive failure. "The Pollution of the Marine Environment by Plastic Debris" review in the Marine Pollution Bulletin notes several species impacted by plastic ingestion influenced by foraging and selectivity factors, such as the loggerhead sea turtle, in which a pattern of white plastics were found to have been consumed.

== Tourism ==
Although the term has shifted meanings over the years, tourism is now more accurately defined as "the set of activities performed by people who travel and stay in places outside their usual environment for not more than one consecutive year, for leisure, business and other purposes". Tourism in Hawaii began in the 19th century and persists today with its tropical weather and landscapes. Welcoming over seven million visitors annually, it is one of the major contributors to Hawaii's economy.

Although it adds to the state's economic growth, tourism is a non-geologically driven environmental issue that also degrades the island ecosystems islands, primarily Hawaiʻi, Oʻahu, Maui, and Kauaʻi, the sites of the major tourism industries. Major concerns of the urban infrastructure development for tourism include habitat loss for local flora and fauna, energy use, consumer waste and pollution, and water shortages. Because of their need to satisfy travel customers, resort destinations' reliance on "the shining sun", "a comfortable climate", and "the beautiful sea" heighten resource use. A 2013 study of five tourism sectors in Hawaiʻi assessed total waste accumulation and resource consumption and estimated that the tourism industry was responsible for "21.7% of the island's total energy consumption, 44.7% of the island-wide water consumption, and 10.7% of the island-wide waste generation". Considering the many negative impacts from tourism, many advocates suggest a push towards a more socially responsible alternative, ecotourism, that would offer a win-win solution by adopting a business model to sustainable practices.

== Invasive species ==
Invasive species are non-native organisms that are introduced, often by humans, to an ecosystem. However, what differentiates invasive species from non-native species is their negative impact and threat to economic, environmental, and human health, which aided by their ability to easily adapt and reproduce. Although invasive species may be introduced naturally, they are typically introduced by accidental or intentional means; intentional purposes include habitat restoration, removal of pests, etc.

== Sea level rise ==
According to a recent NOAA report on sea level rise Hawaii is expected to gain approximately 6-8 inches in sea level rise by 2050. This would result in moderate flooding occurring almost ten times more often than it does today. North West Hawaiian Islands are expected to receive the worst of this flooding effecting the habitats of its wildlife.

== Flora and fauna ==
A number of plant species are now extinct due to grazing livestock, and aggressive non-indigenous species taking over the land. Almost 40% of the endangered species in the United States are Hawaiian species, while nearly 75% of all U.S. extinctions have occurred in Hawaii.

The native flora comprises 89% endemic species, but the flora of Hawaii now includes more than 1044 introduced plant species; more than 100 of these are likely to be invasive in natural areas. Species such as the strawberry guava (Psidium cattleianum), and christmasberry (Schinus terebinthifolius) have spread across wide areas, competing with native species and altering the natural ecosystem. Recent invaders like miconia or velvet tree (Miconia calvescens) and Himalayan raspberry (Rubus ellipticus) are now permanently established over large areas. These species are predicted to decrease watershed function.

Prior to the arrival of non-natives, some bird species were made extinct, or pushed to near extinction from the collection of feathers by Native Hawaiians. With the arrival of James Cook in 1778, a new set of environmental threats emerged. Alien species such as cats, dogs, rabbits, pigs, and rats affected a number of indigenous species. Hawaii is known as the "extinction capital of the world" with the extinction of nearly half (140) of its historically recorded native bird species. Some of the alien species that are currently affecting Hawaii include cane toads, mongoose, coquí frogs, gall wasps, Mediterranean, Oriental, and melon flies that damage crops, ants that destroy native insects, and bacteria that infect waters.

== Air quality ==
Compared with the mainland United States, Hawaii's rating on the air quality index is ranked among the best. Approximately 47% of all emissions are caused by burning fossil fuel for electricity production. Ground transport is the second biggest contributor with 22%, while air transport contributes 19%.

== Superfund sites ==
Map of superfund sites in Hawaii

This is a list of Superfund sites in Hawaii designated under the Comprehensive Environmental Response, Compensation, and Liability Act (CERCLA) environmental law. The CERCLA federal law of 1980 authorized the United States Environmental Protection Agency (EPA) to create a brief list of polluted locations requiring a long-term response to clean up hazardous material contaminations. These locations are known as Superfund sites, and are placed on the National Priorities List (NPL). The NPL guides the EPA in "determining which sites warrant further investigation" for environmental remediation. As of May 1, 2010, there were three Superfund sites on the National Priorities List in Hawaii. One further site has been cleaned up and removed from the NPL; no sites are currently proposed for addition. All sites are on the island of Oahu.

Deleted from National Priorities List

CERCLIS ID	Name	County	Reason	Proposed	Listed	Construction completed	Partially deleted	Deleted
HID980637631	Del Monte Corp. (Oahu Plantation)	Honolulu	Soil and shallow groundwater at the site have been contaminated with the fumigants EDB, DBCP, and DCP, the solvents TCP and benzene and the pesticide lindane.	05/10/1993	12/16/1994	09/08/2008	01/13/2004	–
HI0170090054	Naval Computer & Telecommunications Area	Honolulu	Soil contamination in different areas by PCBs, volatile organics, semi-volatile organics and metals.	01/18/1994	05/31/1994	–	–	–
HI4170090076	Pearl Harbor Naval Complex	Honolulu	Soil, groundwater and sediment are contaminated with metals, organic compounds and petroleum hydrocarbons.	07/29/1991	10/14/1992	–	–	–
HI7210090026	Schofield Barracks (U.S. Army)	Honolulu	Groundwater contains trichloroethylene.	07/14/1989	08/30/1990	09/23/1998	–	08/10/2000

== Other ==
- Hawaii Superferry - were raised that the ferry service would harm marine life, and the unrestricted transport of vehicles may spread invasive species.
- Light pollution in Hawaii

== See also ==
- Environmental issues in the United States
- List of environmental issues
