= List of Superfund sites in Washington =

List of Superfund sites in Washington may refer to:

- List of Superfund sites in Washington (state)
- List of Superfund sites in Washington, D.C.
