= Naval Station Newport =

US Navy base in Rhode Island

- Newport / Middletown, Rhode Island in USA
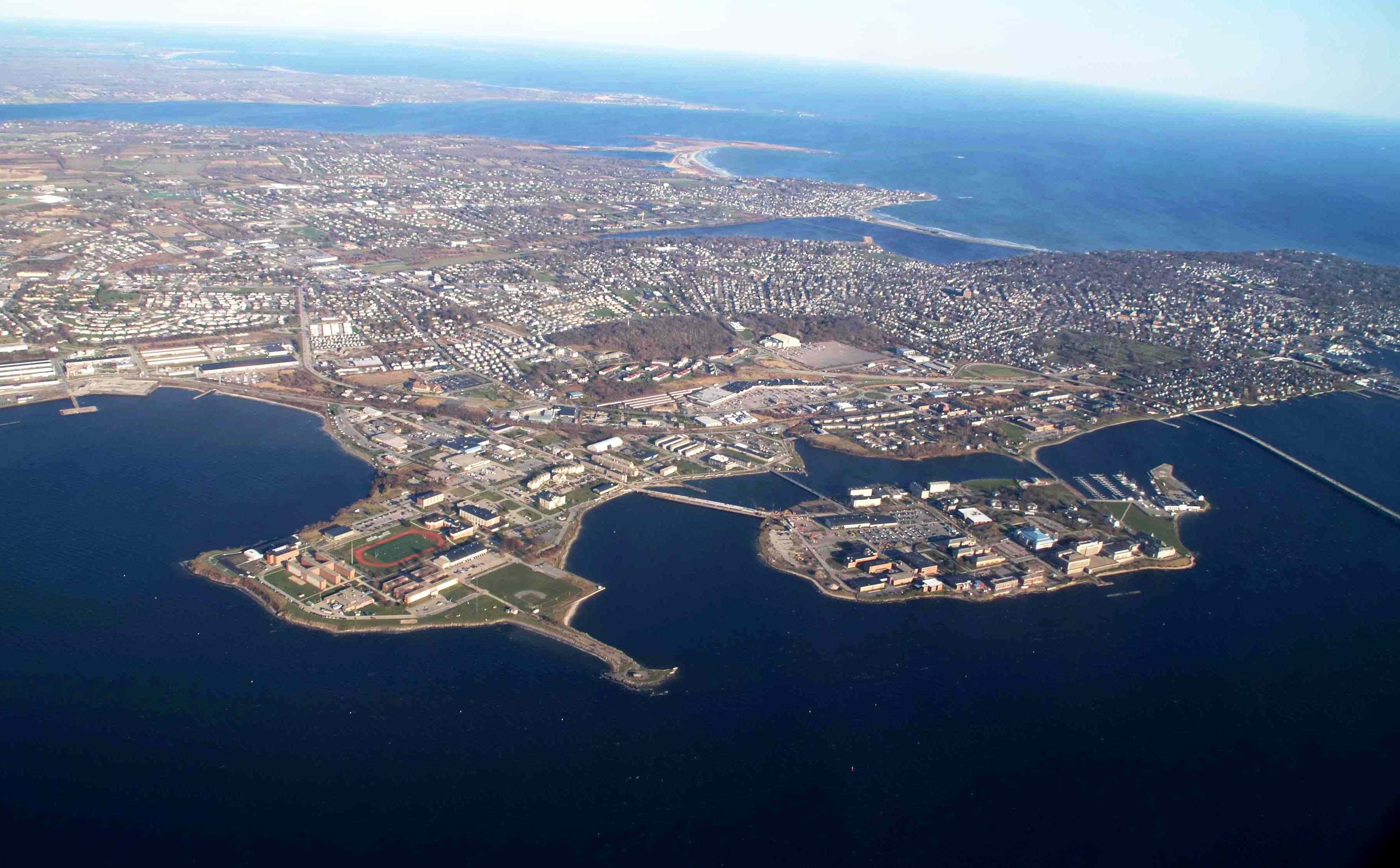
- Aerial view in 2010

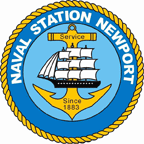
- NAVSTA Newport Insignia

Site information
- Type: Military base
- Controlled by: United States Navy

Location
- Coordinates: 41°31′20″N 71°18′32″W

Site history
- In use: 1883–present

Garrison information
- Past commanders: Captain Ian L. Johnson

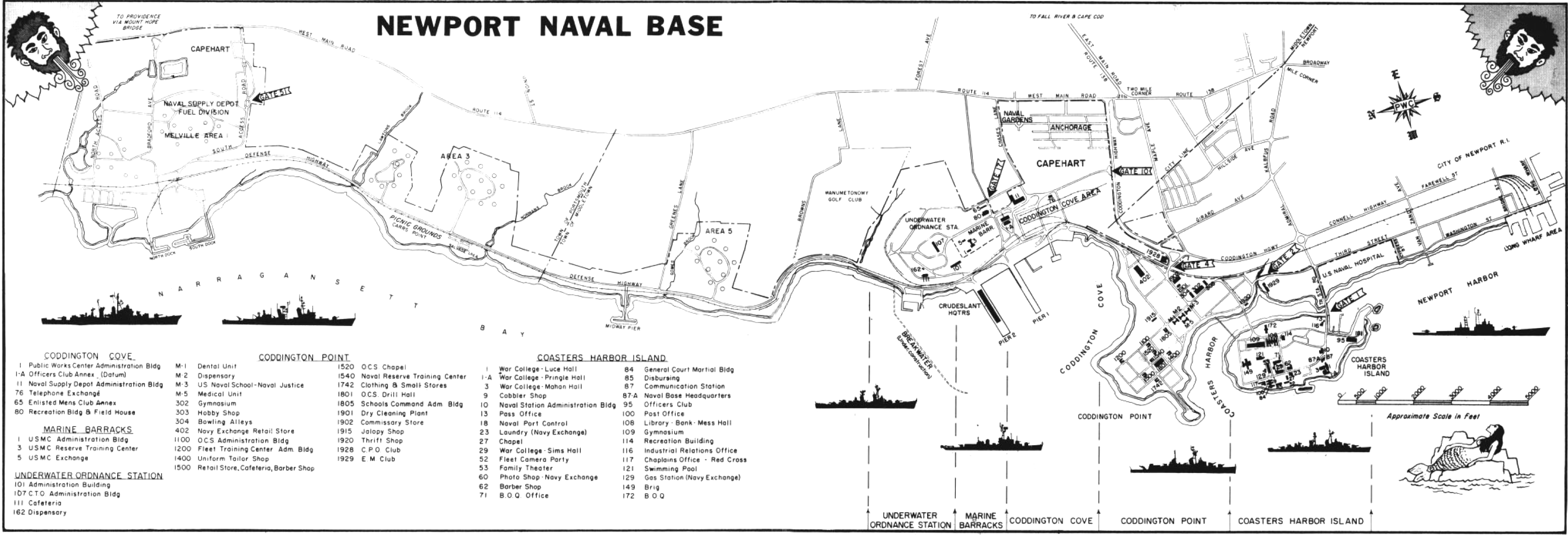
Map of Naval Station Newport in 1966.

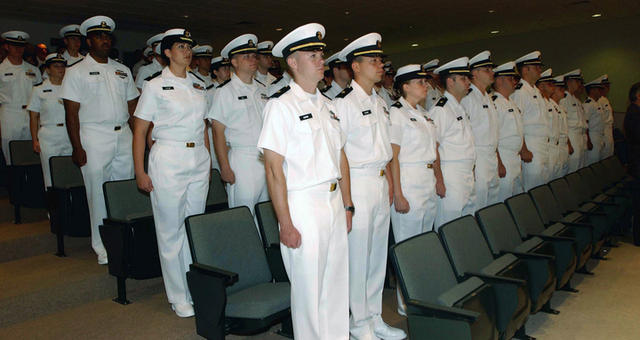
Graduation of the June 23rd 2005 class of the U.S. Navy STA-21 Commissioning Program which was held at NAVSTA Newport.

Naval Station Newport (NAVSTA Newport) is a United States Navy base located in the city of Newport and the town of Middletown, Rhode Island. Naval Station Newport is home to the Naval War College and the Naval Justice School. It once was the homeport for Cruiser Destroyer Force Atlantic (COMCRUDESLANT), which relocated to Naval Station Norfolk in the early 1970s. In 1989 the base was added to the National Priorities List, after contamination had been discovered years earlier. Newport now maintains inactive ships at its pier facilities, along with the United States Coast Guard and National Oceanic and Atmospheric Administration research vessels. In BRAC 2005 (Base Realignment and Closure), NAVSTA Newport gained over five hundred billets, in addition to receiving, again, the Officer Candidate School (OCS), the Naval Supply Corps School (in 2011), and several other activities, to include a few Army Reserve units.

== Geography ==
As of 2022 Naval Station Newport, encompasses 1,063 acres on the west coast of Aquidneck Island in Portsmouth, Rhode Island, Middletown, Rhode Island, and Newport, Rhode Island. The Base also encompasses the northern third of Gould Island (Rhode Island) in the Town of Jamestown, RI.

=== Environmental contamination ===
In 1983, contamination was suspected on 18 areas to pose a threat to human health and/or the environment and in 1989 the base was added to the National Priorities List (NPL). As of 2022, only two sites have no remaining activities, one (Melville North Landfill) because it doesn't belong to the Navy and the other was completed in 2009 (Melville Water Tower). In 1996, a Restoration Advisory Board (RAB) was established.

From 1955 to the mid-1970s, an 11-acre portion of the site along the shore of Narragansett Bay, McAllister Point Landfill, accepted wastes consisting of acids, solvents, paint, waste oil, and oil contaminated with polychlorinated biphenyl. Five tank farms are located in the Melville area; one is located in Midway, one tank farm is located 300 feet from a coastal wetland. Sludge from nearby tank farms was dumped on the ground or burned in chambers. Other areas of concern are an old fire fighting training area, Gould Island, Derecktor Shipyard, Carr Point Storage Area, and MRP Site 1 Carr Point Shooting Range. In 2016, DFSP Melville was added as a new site. The Melville North Landfill was classified as Formerly Used Defense Sites, and will be addressed separately. Of note, surface water and groundwater flow toward Narragansett Bay, which is used for boating and fishing. About 4,800 people obtain drinking water and 220 acres of land are irrigated from private wells located within three miles of the site and about 10,000 people live within three miles of the site.

The petroleum tanks housed at Naval Station Newport are overseen by the federal Defense Logistics Agency (DLA), but the firefighting systems were maintained by the Navy. While the land is polluted with petroleum and PFAS, the Navy has responsibility for PFAS contamination and the DLA for with petroleum. In 2021, after 2 years of the navy being "in the process" of getting permission to test land under the Portsmouth jurisdiction, little progress had been made.

== History ==
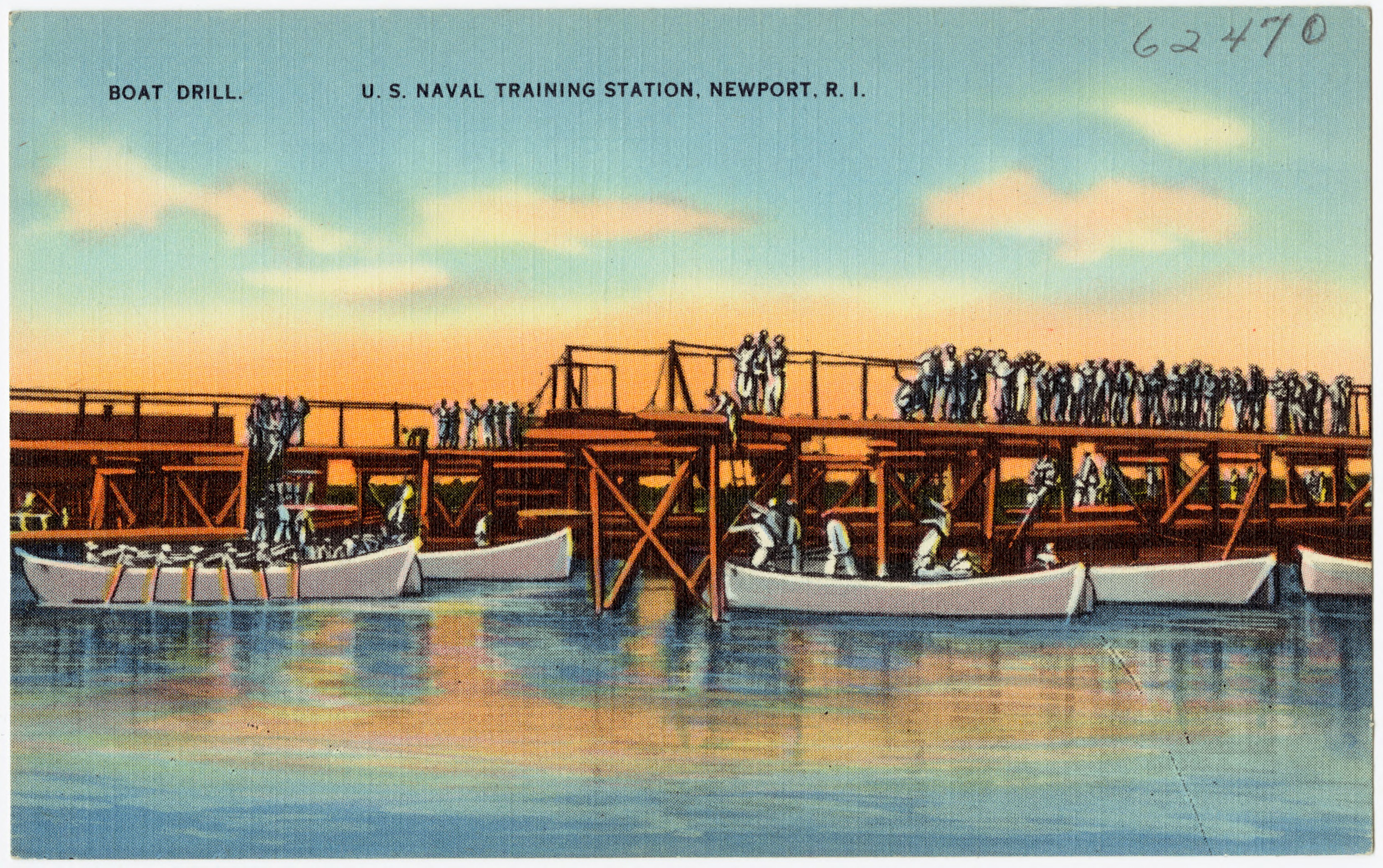
Naval Training Station

The US Department of Navy officially founded the Newport Training Station in 1883, but the legwork between the state of Rhode Island and the Navy dated back to the late 1870s. The Training Station was intended to provide education for young men and boys for a ten month period. Initially 750 students, the training occurred initially on water, fully transitioning to being shore-based by 1887.

During the Civil War, the US Naval Academy was temporarily moved from Annapolis, Maryland to Newport to avoid any potential conflicts relating to the insurgency. Naval training ships, including the USS Constitution, USS Santee and USS John Adams were also moved to Newport Harbor during the conflict to train midshipmen for the Union.

According to the Newport Historical Society,

"With the outbreak of World War I in 1914 the first preparations for war began, and the Training Station expanded onto Coddington Point. By 1916 there were 7,215 men stationed there, and Newport became the home for a yeoman school, signal school, Hospital Corps Training School, Commissary School, Musician's School, and a Firemen's School. After the United States formally entered WWI in April 1917 the Naval Station received authority to increase capacity by 10,000 men. Temporary barracks, mess halls and auxiliary buildings were made into Camp Sadler on Coasters Island, as well as a tent city for 2,800 recruits called Camp Palmer. The enacting of the Selective Service Act of 1917 brought an average of 15,000 men each month for training, and while women were not eligible for the draft, they began enrolling in the Navy at this time. All of this led to more expansion. During WWI, Training Station Newport equipped and sent 65,000 sailors to sea, in addition to thousands of Naval reservists trained there."

In 1919, the station became known for its Newport sex scandal.

From 1900 to the mid-1970s the Newport Naval Education/Training Center (NETC) was used by the Navy as a refueling depot with tank farms and underground storage tanks.

== Current operations ==
The station was home of the decommissioned USS Saratoga (CV-60) after the departure of the USS Forrestal (CV-59) under tow for the inactive ship storage facility in Philadelphia. On May 8, 2014, Naval Sea Systems Command announced that ESCO Marine, Brownsville, Texas, would scrap Saratoga for one cent.

As of September 2014, the Rhode Island Aviation Hall of Fame was trying to move the decommissioned USS John F. Kennedy (CV-67) moored at Pier 2 at the station.

Naval Health Clinic New England provides the health care facilities.

On December 5, 2023 the National Oceanic and Atmospheric Administration awarded a construction contract for new Atlantic Marine Operations Center to be completed by 2027.

== Tenant commands ==
Naval Station Newport provides the facilities and infrastructure essential to support the operations of tenant commands and visiting fleet units.

Navy

- Center for Service Support
- Explosive Ordnance Disposal Mobile Unit 2, Detachment
- Maritime Expeditionary Security Squadron 8
- 7th Naval Construction Regiment
- Naval Mobile Construction Battalion 27 Det 1627
- Naval Undersea Warfare Center
- Naval Academy Preparatory School
- Naval Justice School
- Navy Supply Corps School
- Naval War College
- Officer Candidate School (OCS)
- Officer Development School (ODS)
- Direct Commission Officer Indoctrination Course (DCO)
- Senior Enlisted Academy
- Surface Warfare Officers School
- NAVFAC Mid-Atlantic Public Works Department Newport
- Navy Operational Support Center Newport
- Navy Band Northeast

Marine Corps

- Marine Corps Detachment Newport (MARDET)

Coast Guard

- USCGC Ida Lewis (WLM-551)
- USCGC Juniper (WLB-201)
- USCGC Sycamore (WLB-209)
- USCGC Oak (WLB-211)
- USCG Electronics Support Detachment Detal (ESDD) Castle Hill
- USCG Maintenance Augmentation Team (MAT) Newport

National Oceanic and Atmospheric Administration

- NOAAS Henry B. Bigelow (R 225)

== See also ==
- List of Superfund sites in Rhode Island
