= Isfahan waste management =

Iranian waste management organization

Isfahan City Waste Management
- Industry: Waste management
- Founded: 2003
- Headquarters: Isfahan, Isfahan Province, Iran
- Area served: Municipality of Isfahan
- Number of employees: 140

Isfahan City Waste Management Organization is an integrated waste management system formed in 2003 under the responsibility of the Urban Services of the Municipality of Isfahan, Iran.

== Operations ==
The organization employs 140 people who are tasked with handling Isfahan's approximately 950 tons of daily waste. This includes an estimate of 67 grams per-capita, 15 tons of hospital waste, and 4,000 tons of construction waste. (Note: The task of collecting soil and stray debris is the responsibility of individual contractors.)

After processing and separating recyclable items, garbage is divided into two main categories: organic and inorganic waste.

On normal days, Isfahan's garbage is collected every two days.

=== Recycling ===
12% of Isfahan's produced waste is recycled. Throughout the city, there are seventy recycling booths and stations.

=== Composting ===
Isfahan's organic fertilizer factory was established in 1947 by a Swiss organization. The current factory was built in 1968 on a land of about 100 hectares, located in "Zinel Neck", an area in the east of the city.

== Sustainability initiatives ==
The city of Isfahan had planned to reduce the amount of landfill and buried waste by 2020.

== Programs ==
- Management Quality Control Laboratory
- Construction of a theme park for waste management education
- Obtaining an insurance plan to receive all types of waste
- Funding a pile turner machine (mixer of waste piles)
- Obtaining four new waste disposal sites
- Testing an anaerobic digester system, a pilot program for biogas production
