= Commercial waste =

Materials discarded by businesses or organizations

Commercial waste consists of waste from premises used mainly for the purposes of a trade or business or for the purpose of sport, recreation, education or entertainment, but excluding household, agricultural or industrial waste.

== See also ==
- Business waste
- List of solid waste treatment technologies
- List of Superfund sites in the United States
- List of topics dealing with environmental issues
- List of waste management companies
- List of waste management topics
- List of waste types
- Pollution
- Superfund
