= Uncontrolled waste =

Pollution

Uncontrolled waste is a group of waste types that do not fall into either the controlled, special or hazardous waste categories, such as specific mining wastes and agricultural wastes. This should not be confused with an alternative definition of uncontrolled waste that refers to improper waste disposal.

Uncontrolled waste has significant impacts on the environment. In certain areas of Germany, it was found that industrial waste such as from ore smelting and waste products produced from petrochemical plants were found near population centers. Main effects of waste such as these lead to contamination of groundwater from toxic chemicals, and acidification of oceans as result of CO_{2} emissions from mining
