= List of environmental organisations topics =

This is a list of topics on which environmental organizations focus.

- Agriculture
  - Agricultural pollution
  - Agroforestry
  - Animal husbandry
  - Aquaculture
  - Biodynamic farming
  - Biotechnology
  - Composting
  - Genetically modified foods
  - Herbicides
  - Organic farming
  - Permaculture
- Air quality
  - Acid rain
  - Air pollution
  - Asthma
  - Criteria pollutants
  - Fossil fuels
  - Photochemical smog
  - Indoor Air Quality
  - Industrial pollution
  - Ozone depletion
  - Transport and the environment
- Climate change
  - Global warming
  - Greenhouse effect
  - Urban heat island effect
- Ecosystems
  - Coastal ecosystems
  - Coral reefs
  - Deserts
  - Forests
  - Grasslands
  - Mountains
  - Oceans
  - Rainforests
  - Rivers, Lakes and Streams
  - Wetlands
- Energy
  - Alternative fuels
  - Biomass
  - Energy conservation
  - Efficient energy use
  - Fossil fuel
  - Fuel cells
  - Geothermal energy
  - Hydroelectric energy
  - Nuclear power
  - Solar energy
  - Wind energy
- Environmental disasters
  - Chemical spills
  - Nuclear and radiation accidents
  - Oil spills
- Environmental economics
  - Economic development
  - Free trade
  - Globalization
- Environmental education
  - Environmental studies
  - Outdoor Education
- Environmental ethics
  - Deep ecology
  - Ecofeminism
  - Religion and environmentalism
  - Social Ecology
- Environmental legislation and environmental policy
  - Environmental justice
  - Environmental politics
  - Environmental regulation
- Forests
  - Agroforestry
  - Deforestation
  - Forest management
  - Old growth
  - Rainforests
  - Reforestation
  - Sustainable forestry
- Ground pollution
  - Brownfields
  - Industrial pollution
  - Landfills
  - Pollution prevention
  - Resource extraction
  - Soil quality
- Habitat conservation
  - Marine conservation
  - National parks
  - Pollution
  - Public lands
  - Resource extraction
  - Wilderness areas
- Human health
  - Asbestos
  - Asthma
  - Cancer
  - Chlorine
  - Dioxin
  - Drinking water
  - Fluoride
  - Food quality
  - Genetically modified foods
  - Lead
  - Light pollution
  - Mercury poisoning
  - Multiple chemical sensitivity
  - Noise pollution
  - Occupational safety and health
  - Organochlorines
  - Poverty
  - Radiation
  - Radon
  - Toxins
- Natural disaster
  - Avalanche
  - Cold wave
  - Drought
  - Earthquake
  - Floods
  - Geomagnetic storm
  - Heat wave
  - Hurricane
  - Impact event
  - Landslide
  - Lightning strike
  - Tornado
  - Tsunami
  - Volcanic eruption
  - Wildfire
- Natural history
  - Environmental history
  - Prehistory
- Oceans
  - Aquaculture
  - Beaches
  - Coastal ecosystems
  - Coral Reefs
  - Fisheries
  - Marine biology
  - Oceanography
- Outdoor recreation
  - Biking
  - Bird watching
  - Hiking/Backpacking
  - Snowsports/Ice sports
  - Water sports
- Population
  - Overconsumption
  - Overpopulation
- Sciences
  - Astronomy
  - Atmospheric sciences
  - Biology
  - Biotechnology
  - Botany
  - Chemistry
  - Ecology
  - Geodesy
  - Geography
  - Geology
  - Glaciology
  - Hydrology
  - Meteorology
  - Oceanography
  - Ornithology
  - Paleontology
  - Physics
  - Seismology
  - Soil science
  - Volcanology
  - Zoology
- Social sciences and humanities
  - Archaeology
  - Ethnic diversity
  - Indigenous cultures
  - World cultures
- Sustainable business
  - Alternative fuels
  - Corporate accountability
  - Economic development
  - Ecotourism
  - Energy conservation
  - Green building
  - Social investing
  - Sustainable technology
  - Waste reduction
  - Water conservation
- Sustainable development
  - Economic development
  - Sustainable agriculture
  - Sustainable forestry
  - Sustainable technology
- Sustainable living
  - Consumerism
  - Green building
  - Home maintenance
  - Organic gardening
  - Social investing
  - Sustainable transport
- Transportation
  - Alternative fuel vehicles
  - Bicycles
  - Mass transit
  - Remote work
- Urban issues
  - Light pollution
  - Noise pollution
  - Sprawl
  - Traffic
  - Urban heat island effect
  - Urban planning
- Vegetarianism
  - Fruitarianism
  - Veganism
  - Vegetarianism
  - Lacto vegetarianism
- Waste management
  - Bioremediation
  - Composting
  - Environmental remediation
  - Hazardous and toxic waste
  - Landfills
  - Nuclear Waste
  - Recycling
- Water quality
  - Beaches
  - Drinking water
  - Fishing
  - Industrial pollution
  - Water conservation
  - Water pollution
  - Water treatment
  - Watersheds
- Wildlife
  - Biodiversity
  - Conservation biology
  - Endangered species
  - Fauna
  - Flora
  - Invasive species
  - Native plants
  - Wildflowers
  - Wildlife conservation
  - Wildlife sanctuaries

== See also ==
- List of conservation issues
- List of environmental issues
- List of environmental organizations
