= Superfund Research Program =

US environmental health program

- Abbreviation: SRP
- Formation: 1986
- Type: University-based environmental health research program
- Purpose: Research on hazardous substances, human health risk assessment, and remediation
- Region served: United States
- Parent organization: National Institute of Environmental Health Sciences
- Budget: $50.198 million (2008)

The Superfund Research Program (SRP) is a university-based research program that supports the national Superfund program by addressing a wide variety of scientific concerns. It was created within the National Institute of Environmental Health Sciences in 1986 under the Superfund Amendments and Reauthorization Act (SARA).

The SRP has a broad mandate including:

1. The development of methods and resources to detect hazardous substances in the environment.
2. The improvement of techniques of assessing the effects of hazardous substances on human health.
3. The development of methods of assessing the risks hazardous substances pose to human health.
4. The development of biological, chemical, and physical methods of decreasing hazardous substances and their toxicity.

The SRP encourages data sharing across different medical disciplines, to help better understand the link between exposures and health. To support grantees with data sharing the SRP has run webinars, and launched a data set library that contains a repository of research conducted by other grantees.

The SRP currently funds multi-project grants at sixteen institutions (Boston University School of Public Health, Brown University, Columbia University, Dartmouth College, Harvard School of Public Health, Massachusetts Institute of Technology, Michigan State University, Northeastern University, Oregon State University, University of Arizona, University of California, Berkeley, University of California, Davis, University of California, San Diego, University of Iowa, University of Kentucky, University of North Carolina at Chapel Hill, and the University of Washington).

They currently fund more than twenty four separate university-based research centers using its annual budget. They also fund individual research projects, training education programs, and small business research projects.

The 2008 budget request amount for the SRP was $50.198 million.

== See also ==
- TOXMAP
- List of Superfund sites in the United States
