= Hazardous Substances Data Bank =

Database of toxic compounds

TOXNET: Hazardous Substances Data Bank
Content
- Description: Chemical pharmacology and toxicology data
- Data types captured: 5000+ potentially hazardous chemicals; human exposure; pharmacology; metabolism; medications excreted in breastmilk; industrial hygiene; emergency handling; environmental fate; regulatory requirements; related areas
- Organisms: Humans & other animals

Contact
- Research center: NCBI
- Primary citation: Fonger (1995); Fonger, et al (2014)

Access
- Website: www.nlm.nih.gov/toxnet/index.html

Miscellaneous
- License: Public domain
- Data release frequency: Weekly
- Curation policy: Peer-reviewed by the Scientific Review Panel

The Hazardous Substances Data Bank (HSDB) was a toxicology database on the U.S. National Library of Medicine's (NLM) Toxicology Data Network (TOXNET). It focused on the toxicology of potentially hazardous chemicals, and included information on human exposure, industrial hygiene, emergency handling procedures, environmental fate, regulatory requirements, and related areas. All data were referenced and derived from a core set of books, government documents, technical reports, and selected primary journal literature. Prior to 2020, all entries were peer-reviewed by a Scientific Review Panel (SRP), members of which represented a spectrum of professions and interests. Last Chairs of the SRP are Dr. Marcel J. Cassavant, MD, Toxicology Group, and Dr. Roland Everett Langford, PhD, Environmental Fate Group. The SRP was terminated due to budget cuts and realignment of the NLM.

The HSDB was organized into individual chemical records, and contained over 5000 such records. It was accessible free of charge via TOXNET. Users could search by chemical or other name, chemical name fragment, CAS registry number and/or subject terms. Recent additions included radioactive materials and certain mixtures, like crude oil and oil dispersants as well as animal toxins. As of November 2014, there were approximately 5,600 chemical specific HSDB records available.

== TOXNET databases ==
The Toxicology Data Network (TOXNET) was a group of databases hosted on the National Library of Medicine (NLM) website that covered "chemicals and drugs, diseases and the environment, environmental health, occupational safety and health, poisoning, risk assessment and regulations, and toxicology". TOXNET was managed by the NLM's Toxicology and Environmental Health Information Program (TEHIP) in the Division of Specialized Information Services (SIS).

The TOXNET databases included:

1. HSDB: Hazardous Substances Data Bank
  - Peer-reviewed toxicology data for over 5,000 hazardous chemicals
2. TOXLINE
  - 4 million references to literature on biochemical, pharmacological, physiological, and toxicological effects of drugs and other chemicals
3. ChemIDplus
  - Dictionary of over 400,000 chemicals (names, synonyms, and structures)
4. LactMed: Drugs and Lactation Database
  - Drugs and other chemicals to which breastfeeding mothers may be exposed
5. DART: Developmental and Reproductive Toxicology Database
  - References to developmental and reproductive toxicology literature
6. TOXMAP
  - Environmental Health Maps provides searchable, interactive maps of EPA TRI and Superfund data, plus US Census and NCI health data
7. TRI: Toxics Release Inventory
  - Annual environmental releases of over 600 toxic chemicals by U.S. facilities
8. CTD: Comparative Toxicogenomics Database
  - Access to scientific data describing relationships between chemicals, genes and human diseases
9. Household Products Database
  - Potential health effects of chemicals in more than 10,000 common household products
10. Haz-Map
  - Links jobs and hazardous tasks with occupational diseases and their symptoms
11. IRIS: Integrated Risk Information System
  - Hazard identification and dose-response assessment for over 500 chemicals
12. ITER: International Toxicity Estimates for Risk
  - Risk information for over 600 chemicals from authoritative groups worldwide
13. ALTBIB
  - Resources on Alternatives to the Use of Live Vertebrates in Biomedical Research and Testing
