= Business waste =

Waste generated in commercial establishments

Business waste is waste generated through commercial business operations, such as retail shops, places of entertainment, or administration. Business waste is defined in contrast to household waste, but may be disposed of via municipal waste management.

== See also ==
- Commercial waste
- List of waste management companies
- List of waste management topics
- List of solid waste treatment technologies
- List of Superfund sites in the United States
- List of topics dealing with environmental issues
- Pollution
- Superfund
