= Limestone Road =

Coordinates: 39.626°N 78.73°W

The Limestone Road Superfund Site is a Superfund site located in Cumberland, Maryland on land on both sides of Limestone Road. "The Site is located in the Valley and Ridge physiographic province of the Appalachian Highlands. The area is dominated by steeply dipping slopes and ravines and northeast/southwest trending ridges. Relief in the vicinity of the Site is approximately 1,100 feet, ranging in elevation from 590 feet above sea level at the North Branch of the Potomac River to 1,700 feet above sea level at the crest of Irons Mountain. The Site itself is located on the western slope of Irons Mountain. The elevations across the Site range from 660 feet above sea level to approximately 900 feet above sea level.".

== History ==
In 1956, the Cumberland Cement and Supply Company bought a 191-acre piece of land next to Limestone Road. In the 1970s, the company started to allow dumping of housing material onto the property. The Environmental Protection Agency states the "properties were used for the disposal of commercial, residential, and demolition waste during the 1960s and 1970s. In 1981, approximately 110 tons of waste sludge containing chromium, lead, and cadmium were illegally dumped on both properties. In June of 1981, following an initial investigation by the State of Maryland, the property owners were ordered to clean up their respective properties. This order was eventually stayed when the EPA took over the lead at the site in 1982."

== Proposed solutions ==
1. Excavate the soil and dispose it to another facility.
2. Capping the soil and monitoring the sediment and water.
3. Restrict the deed to the property and bring in Cumberland municipal water.
4. Restrict the deed to the property, fence the area, and monitor soil and sediment.
5. No action.

== EPA selected alternative ==
- Site Grading
- Capping of contaminated soil
- Fencing of both properties
- Continues monitoring of water and sediment
- Complete review of geological information
- Collect geological information
- Chemical analysis of shale
- Reevaluate background data
- Sampling to increase data base
- Evaluate the effects of plumbing conditions

== Water pollution ==
In a press release in 2000 the EPA stated that “will oversee Allegany County’s hookup of the public water supply to 20 residents who live near the Limestone Road Superfund hazardous waste site.” It was discovered that there was pollution in the local wells from the Limestone Road superfund site. The objective of supplying public water is so the people living around the Limestone Road site would have access to running drinkable water.
