= Light pollution in Hawaii =

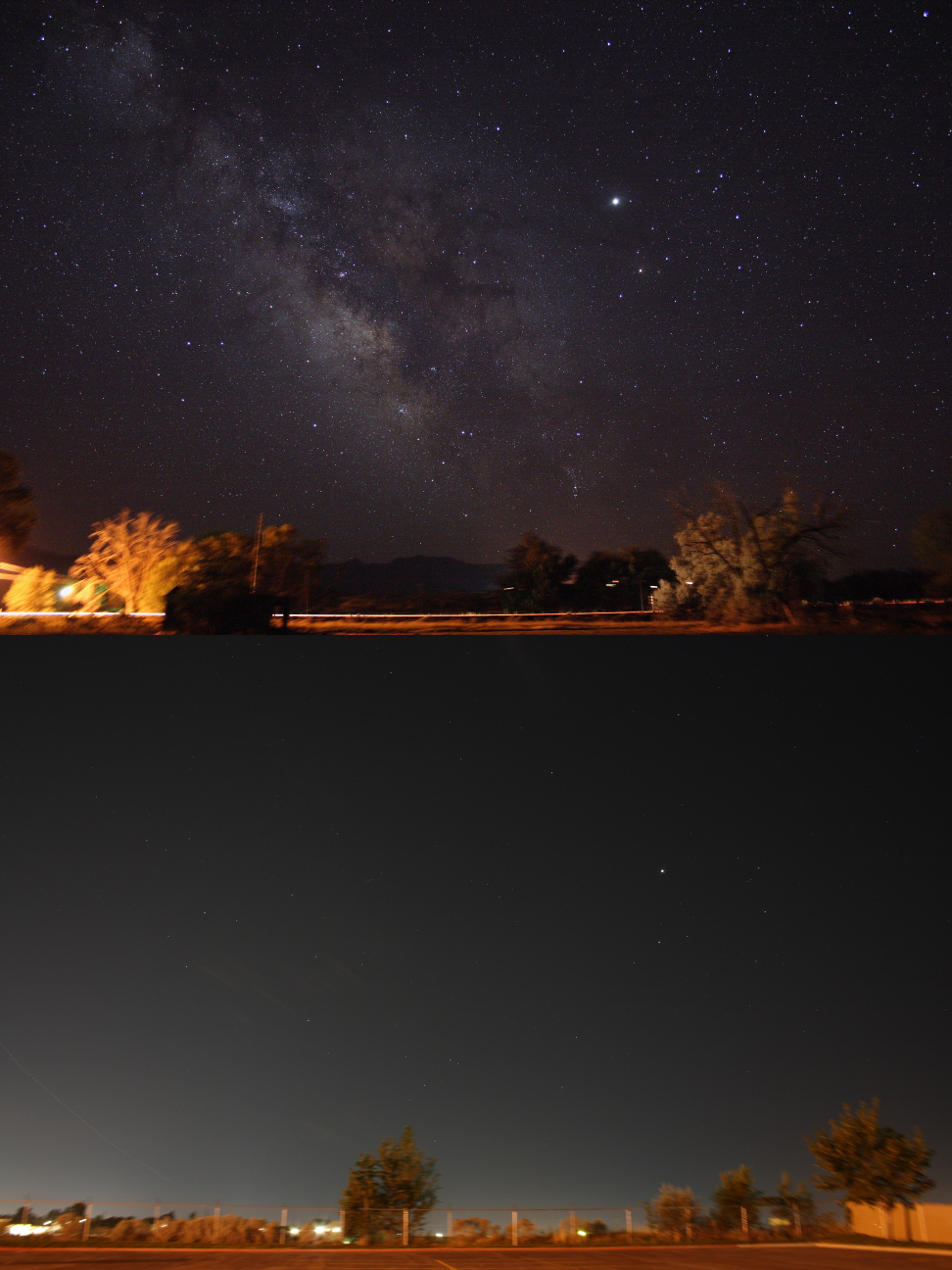
Light pollution country versus city.

Light pollution is the presence of unwanted artificial light that brightens the night sky. Improperly shielded lights are the source of many of the issues regarding the light pollution in Hawaii. Urban centers in the cities are often so bathed in light that over a hundred kilometers from the city's edge, the light pollution resulting from the glow is present. Fabio Falchi is quoted as stating that "light pollution is one of the most pervasive forms of environmental alteration" due to its destructive nature in both un- and protected areas such as national parks. Dark night skies are an important natural, cultural, scientific, educational, and economic resource for Hawaii.

One of the major cultural importance of the night sky is its use as a guide for Polynesians who first travelled to the islands, allowing tourists and native residents to connect with their history. Light pollution may also affect the cultural celebration of Makahiki – the start of the Hawaiian New Year – which relies on the movement of the stars.

== Effects ==
=== Effects on the economy ===
The night sky has a significant economic impact on the islands of Hawaiʻi. The University of Hawaiʻi notes that 1,313 residents were employed in the astronomy sector, and $221 billion in total revenue was generated in 2019. This sector, however, is not directly linked to the tourist industry. While this sector is noted as sustainable, the necessary infrastructure and research techniques employed are opposed to by many native Hawaiians. The Mauna Kea Observatory is located on sacred land protected by the Historical Preservation Act, and its night sky – noted by some to be one of the clearest on the island – has become notably disrupted by the light pollution found in primarily urban and economic sectors.

Efforts to minimise the effects of light pollution within the state in order to protect the night sky have been ongoing. The Office of Hawaiian Affairs established a dark skies protection committee in 2017 in order to mediate the amount of light pollution present, primarily surrounding Maui and Honolulu. In 2022, Maui released a bill detailing increased regulation and energy conservation regarding light pollution on the island. Prior to this bill, the island had been noted as having lax lighting regulations and enforcement. Despite these legal actions, Richard F. Green notes that efforts worldwide towards light pollution "concentrate on individual fixtures or at most, individual parcels of land, rather than the summed regional impact on observatories for which the effect of mitigation attempts is most relevant." This, alongside his concern about efforts focusing on minimising impact without considering what is acceptable, may influence future perspectives on the issue.

=== Effects on the population ===
Light pollution has many effects on the local population. Of these, one of the most notable is the connection between major contributions to light pollution and the historical and current oppression faced by native Hawaiian communities. The organised efforts against infrastructure such as the Mauna Kea and other observatories highlights a trend of hostile takeover of land for use in cities or tourist centres. As Haunani-Kay Trask notes, "Th[e] diminution of Federal oversight meant that Hawaiians had no judicial recourse to prevent abuse of their trust lands by the State." Through this support of the state over local populations, the centres most responsible for the current light pollution crisis were developed and disputes ignored.

Light pollution also has linked health complications, such as being unable to sleep due to 'light trespass'. Excessive light in sleeping environments has recently been linked to increased rates of breast cancer in women. It also affects circadian rhythm, which controls many physiologic processes such as hormone production, cell regulation, and brainwave patterns. A disruption of the circadian rhythm is linked to health issues such as depression, insomnia, cardiovascular disease and cancers. Retinal degeneration and accelerated genetic retinal disease are also speculated to be linked to increased exposure to excess illumination. Studies show that these effects are most prevalent in large cities due to the volume of artificial lighting present. Sterling Hega states that due to this, "homeless people living on the streets are among those most affected by light pollution." While noting that no conclusive studies have been done on homeless populations 'due to logistical and ethical concerns', testing from lab settings under similar conditions faced by individuals were shown to exhibit negative responses (such as insomnia) after just a few hours of exposure to high blue-content LED lighting.

=== Effects on astronomy ===
The dark night sky has a scientific importance for astronomy research and viewing.

Urban sky glow is taking away the view of the stars and night sky that was so common to the ancestors of the land. In the city of Honolulu, only about 20 stars can be seen on the nightly, and in places with a dark night sky, up to 2,000 stars can be seen nightly. Hawaiʻi has two major astronomical observatories and the dark sky is immensely important for the telescopes to be able to see faint objects in space. The dark night sky over the island of Hawaiʻi, is a known tourist attraction with over 100,000 visitors every year. The visitors come to watch the night sky and participate in the stargazing program at the Mauna Kea Observatory. Mauna Kea's sky is one of the darkest in the world.

=== Disruption of the ecosystem ===
Artificial light is about two hundred times more bright than natural illumination experienced in the raw environment. In the United States, it is estimated that around one-third of all lighting is wasted. This, alongside replacing incandescent lighting with brighter LEDs, causes significant harm to flora and fauna around the islands of Hawaiʻi. It can alter behaviors and breeding cycles in animals living throughout the island. In Hawaiʻi, there are some sea turtle and marine bird species that are on the endangered lists and artificial light exceptionally affects them by disorienting them.

The Newell's shearwater – a critically endangered seabird endemic to Hawaiʻi – and other native seabirds are greatly affected; disorientation from lights was found to be the third top driver for seabird mortality in a 2011 study. Julie Leialoha, the interim executive director of the Conservation Council for Hawaiʻi, stated that "the Hawaiian petrel is critically endangered, with bright lights one of the biggest culprits in its decline." Shearwaters are primarily affected because they are nocturnal and nest in coastal cliff sides, where they travel from to the ocean to feed. When chicks fledge, they become disoriented from these coastal lights, which causes them to fall to the ground from exhaustion or collide with nearby buildings and other man-made structures – known as fallout. Once on the ground, they are unable to take off, causing thousands to die from car collisions, predation from species such as dogs and cats, exhaustion, or dehydration. Due to this, the Center for Biological Diversity estimates the Newell's shearwater population "has been declining at rates far exceeding 50 percent over the species' last three generations.".

Alongside seabirds, local sea turtle populations have been affected by artificial light pollution. Both species commonly seen along Hawaiian shorelines – the Hawaiian Green Sea Turtle and Hawksbill Sea Turtle – are considered endangered, with Hawksbills being critically endangered. These species take decades to reach sexual maturity, where the females return to nest at the location of their birth. Artificial lighting, especially those with high blue-light content, can discourage females from nesting; abandoned nesting attempts – known as 'false crawls' – can be directly linked to excess light. The Sea Turtle Conservatory states "if a female fails to nest after multiple false crawls, she will resort to less-than-optimal nesting spots or deposit her eggs in the ocean", leading to a decrease in survival for vital hatchlings. Lights can also disorient adults, leaving them stranded upon the beaches or wandering towards man-made structures or roads. Hatchlings, which some marine biologists theorise follow moonlight to the ocean, become confused as artificial light emeulates or outshines natural moonlight. As a result, they travel towards structures rather than the safety of the ocean, causing them to die by cars, dehydration, predation, and exhaustion. David Henkin notes that "one bright, unfiltered street light can wipe out hundreds of turtle hatchlings." Since hawksbill population numbers are so few, the effects of light pollution are far greater; Hannah Bernard states that 'we cannot afford' having unregulated lighting surrounding their habitat due to their rarity. Coastal communities worldwide have implemented 'lights-out' initiatives for turtles and other marine species in order to reduce casualty numbers, but these are often not enforced nor address larger light pollution centres and issues, such as large cities.

In 2019, the population of these birds and other native wildlife was further threatened through a development project headed by the Maui County Department of Public Works. Officials planned to replace 4800 streetlights with newer LED fixtures, and ignored both wildlife experts and community member's concerns on the blue-light content of their bulbs. The proposed lights had a high content of blue light (approximately 20 percent), while low content LEDs (less than 2 percent) were available and used throughout the main Hawaiian islands. Rather than addressing backlash from the local communities, the department launched their project in secret, without an environmental review as required by the Hawaiʻi Environmental Policy Act. They also put forth an exemption stating the review was not required for the project after starting it. Formal court complaints note that this exception declaration "lacks any statements or analysis regarding whether "the cumulative impact of planned successive actions…is significant…or whether [the project], even if "normally insignificant in its impact on the environment may be significant in a particularly sensitive environment". Thereby, they are not considered eligible and not exempt from environmental review as claimed. A civil suit was filed in response by the Hawaiʻi Wildlife Fund. In February 2020, the County Department was found guilty of violating state law by starting the project without proper review.
