= List of Superfund sites =

A map of Superfund sites as of October 2013. Red indicates currently on final National Priority List, yellow is proposed, green is deleted (usually meaning having been cleaned up).

Superfund sites are polluted locations in the United States requiring a long-term response to clean up hazardous material contaminations. Sites include landfills, mines, manufacturing facilities, processing plants where toxic waste has either been improperly managed or dumped. They were designated under the Comprehensive Environmental Response, Compensation, and Liability Act (CERCLA) of 1980. CERCLA authorized the United States Environmental Protection Agency (EPA) to create a list of such locations, which are placed on the National Priorities List (NPL).

The NPL guides the EPA in "determining which sites warrant further investigation" for environmental remediation. As of June 6, 2024, there were 1,340 Superfund sites in the National Priorities List in the United States. Thirty-nine recent additional sites have been proposed for entry on the list, and 457 sites have been cleaned up and removed from the list. However the total number of sites has been slowly growing, not declining. In August of 2011 there were a total of 1280 sites listed indicating a rise of 60 between 2011 and 2024. New Jersey, California, and Pennsylvania have the most sites.

== Lists of Superfund sites ==
=== U.S. states and federal district ===
- Alabama
- Alaska
- Arizona
- Arkansas
- California
- Colorado
- Connecticut
- Delaware
- District of Columbia
- Florida
- Georgia
- Hawaii
- Idaho
- Illinois
- Indiana
- Iowa
- Kansas
- Kentucky
- Louisiana
- Maine
- Maryland
- Massachusetts
- Michigan
- Minnesota
- Mississippi
- Missouri
- Montana
- Nebraska
- Nevada
- New Hampshire
- New Jersey
- New Mexico
- New York
- North Carolina
- North Dakota
- Ohio
- Oklahoma
- Oregon
- Pennsylvania
- Rhode Island
- South Carolina
- South Dakota
- Tennessee
- Texas
- Utah
- Vermont
- Virginia
- Washington
- West Virginia
- Wisconsin
- Wyoming

=== Insular areas ===
- American Samoa
- Guam
- Northern Mariana Islands
- Puerto Rico
- U.S. Virgin Islands

== See also ==
- Agency for Toxic Substances and Disease Registry
- Environmental issues in the United States
- List of environmental issues
- List of waste types
- TOXMAP
