= Inorganic waste =

Inorganic waste is a type of waste that does not contain organic compounds. This waste is generally very difficult to decompose by microorganisms. Glass, aluminum cans, dust, and metal are some examples of inorganic waste. Inorganic waste remains free from decay, with more than 500 years needed being common for effective decomposition, therefore disposal can be challenging. Reducing consumption, reusing, and recycling are possible solutions for coping with this type of waste.
