= List of waste types =

Waste comes in many different forms and may be categorized in a variety of ways. The types listed here are not necessarily exclusive and there may be considerable overlap so that one waste entity may fall into one to many types.

- Agricultural waste
- Animal by-products (see slaughterhouse waste)
- Biodegradable waste
- Biomedical waste
- Bulky waste
- Business waste
- Chemical waste
- Clinical waste (see Biomedical waste)
- Coffee wastewater
- Commercial waste
- Composite waste
- Construction and demolition waste (C&D waste)
- Controlled waste
- Demolition waste
- Dog waste
- Domestic waste
- Electronic waste (e-waste)
- Food waste
- Green waste
- Grey water
- Hazardous waste
- Household waste
  - Household hazardous waste
- Human waste
  - Sewage sludge
- Industrial waste
  - Slag
  - Fly ash
  - Sludge
- Inert waste
- Inorganic waste
- Kitchen waste
- Litter
- Marine debris
- Medical waste
- Metabolic waste. See also Feces.
- Mineral waste. See also Inorganic waste.
- Mixed waste
- Municipal solid waste
- Nuclear waste (see Radioactive waste)
- Organic waste
- Packaging waste
- Post-consumer waste
- Radioactive waste
  - Low-level waste
  - High-level waste
  - Mixed waste (radioactive/hazardous)
  - Spent nuclear fuel
- Recyclable waste
- Residual waste
- Retail hazardous waste
- Sewage
- Sharps waste
- Ship disposal
- Slaughterhouse waste
- Special waste (see Hazardous waste)
- Toxic waste
- Uncontrolled waste
- Waste heat
- Wastewater
- Winery wastewater

== See also ==
- List of waste management companies
- List of waste management topics
- List of solid waste treatment technologies
- List of Superfund sites in the United States
- List of topics dealing with environmental issues
- Pollution
- Waste characterisation
- Waste management
- Waste-to-energy
