= National Priorities List =

Priority list of hazardous waste sites in the United States

Map of NPL sites currently on final National Priority List proposed addition deleted (usually meaning having been cleaned up)

The National Priorities List (NPL) is the priority list of hazardous waste sites in the United States eligible for long-term remedial investigation and remedial action (cleanup) financed under the federal Superfund program. Environmental Protection Agency (EPA) regulations outline a formal process for assessing hazardous waste sites and placing them on the NPL. The NPL is intended primarily to guide EPA in determining which sites are so contaminated as to warrant further investigation and significant cleanup.

As of 2022, 1333 sites are on the list, and 43 sites have been proposed for listing. 448 sites have been deleted from the list.

== Process for listing ==
The Comprehensive Environmental Response, Compensation, and Liability Act of 1980 (CERCLA), also known as "Superfund", requires that the criteria provided by the Hazard Ranking System (HRS) be used to make a list of national priorities of the known releases or threatened releases of hazardous substances, pollutants, or contaminants in the United States. This list is Appendix B of the National Contingency Plan, known as the "National Priorities List."

Hazardous waste sites become eligible for CERCLA/Superfund cleanup when EPA receives a report of a potentially hazardous waste site from an individual, state government, or responsible federal agency. EPA will first enter the potentially contaminated facility into a database known as the Comprehensive Environmental Response, Compensation, and Liability Information System (CERCLIS). Then, either EPA or the state in which the potentially contaminated facility is located will conduct a preliminary assessment, which decides if the facility poses a threat to human health and/or the environment. If the preliminary assessment shows the possibility of contamination, EPA (or the state under agreement with EPA) will conduct a more detailed site inspection. EPA then uses the HRS to review any available data on the site to determine whether its environmental or health risks are enough to qualify the facility for a Superfund NPL cleanup. Generally, facilities with overall scores of 28.50 and greater on the HRS are eligible for the NPL.

Another way facilities can be included in the NPL is if a state or territory designates one top-priority site within its jurisdiction, regardless of the site's HRS score. The last way a site can be included in the NPL is if it meets the following three requirements:

1. The Agency for Toxic Substances and Disease Registry has issued a health advisory that recommends removing people from the facility.
2. EPA determines that the site poses a significant threat to public health.
3. EPA believes that it will be more cost-effective to use its remedial authority (which is only available at National Priorities List facilities) than to use its emergency removal authority in responding to the facility.

EPA may delete a final NPL site if it determines that no further response is required to protect human health or the environment. Also, sites where a remediation was completed through the Superfund program are typically deleted from the list. As of 2022, 1333 sites are on the list, and 48 sites have been proposed for listing. 443 sites were deleted from the list.

The primary cleanup goal is to reduce the risks to human health and the environment through a combination of cleanup, engineered controls like caps and site restrictions such as groundwater use restrictions. A secondary goal is to return the site to productive use as a business, recreation or as a natural ecosystem. Identifying the intended reuse early in the cleanup often results in faster and less expensive cleanups. EPA's Superfund Redevelopment Program provides tools and support for site redevelopment.

== Public comment process ==
The public has the opportunity to comment on facilities that are proposed to be added to the National Priorities List. EPA publishes notices in the Federal Register listing the proposed facilities. The agency will consider all comments received within 60 days after publication in the Register. The complete set of comments are available to the public one week following the close of the comment period. EPA makes a final listing of decisions after considering all the relevant comments that were received during the comment period.

== EPA Superfund docket ==
The Superfund docket contains the Hazard Ranking System score sheets for each proposed facility, a documentation record for each facility that details the information used to compute the score, information for any facility affected by particular statutory requirements or EPA listing policies, and a list of documents referenced in the documentation record.

== Mapping system ==
TOXMAP was a geographic information system (GIS) application from the Division of Specialized Information Services of the United States National Library of Medicine (NLM) that used maps of the United States to help users visually explore data from the EPA Superfund Basic Research Program and the Toxics Release Inventory. The application was deprecated in December of 2019 by the first Trump administration.

== Detailed list ==
- List of Superfund sites
