= TOXMAP =

GIS of the U.S. National Library of Medicine

TOXMAP was a geographic information system (GIS) from the United States National Library of Medicine (NLM) that was deprecated on December 16, 2019. The application used maps of the United States to help users explore data from the United States Environmental Protection Agency's (EPA) Toxics Release Inventory (TRI) and Superfund programs with visual projections and maps.

== Description ==
TOXMAP helped users create nationwide, regional, or local area maps showing where TRI chemicals are released on-site into the air, water, ground, and by underground injection, as reported by industrial facilities in the United States. It also identified the releasing facilities, color-codes release amounts for a single year or year range, and provides multi-year aggregate chemical release data and trends over time, starting with 1988. Maps also can show locations of Superfund sites on the Agency for Toxic Substances and Disease Registry National Priorities List (NPL), which lists all chemical contaminants present at these sites. TOXMAP is a useful environmental health tool that makes epidemiological and environmental information available to the public.

There were two versions of TOXMAP available from its home page: the classic version of TOXMAP released in 2004 and, a newer version released in 2014 that is based on Adobe Flash/Apache Flex technology. In addition to many of the features of TOXMAP classic, the new version provides an improved map appearance and interactive capabilities as well as a more current GIS look-and-feel. This included seamless panning, immediate update of search results when zooming to a location, two collapsible side panels to maximize map size, and automatic size adjustment after a window resize. The new TOXMAP also improved U.S. Census layers and availability by Census Tract (2000 and 2010), Canadian National Pollutant Release Inventory (NPRI) data, U.S. commercial nuclear power plants, as well as improved and updated congressional district boundaries.

TOXMAP classic users may search the system by location (such as city, state, or ZIP code), chemical name, chemical name fragment, release medium, release amount, facility name and ID, and can filter results to those residing within a pre-defined or custom geographic region.

Search results may be brought up in Google Maps or Google Earth, or saved for use in other tools. TOXMAP also overlays map data such as U.S. Census population information, income figures from the Bureau of Economic Analysis, and health data from the National Cancer Institute and the National Center for Health Statistics.

The data shown in TOXMAP comes from the following sources:

- EPA Toxics Release Inventory (TRI)
- EPA Superfund Program (National Priorities List/NPL)
- Environment Canada
- National Institute of Environmental Health Sciences (NIEHS) Superfund Research Program
- Hazardous Substances Data Bank
- NLM TOXLINE (Toxicology Bibliographic Information)
- Agency for Toxic Substances and Disease Registry
- National Atlas of the United States
- Surveillance, Epidemiology, and End Results database
- National Center for Health Statistics
- Nuclear Regulatory Commission
- Esri

== Shutdown ==
The database was pulled from the internet by the Trump administration in December 2019. The NLM said in a statement that much of the information remained available from the original sources, and that thus the database could be removed; critics, such as the Environmental Data & Governance Initiative, suggested it was part of a larger effort on the part of the administration to obfuscate the detrimental results of the rollback of Obama-era environmental regulations.

The data underlying TOXMAP remains accessible through their original resources: Government of Canada National Pollutant Release Inventory (NPRI), U.S. Census Bureau, U.S. EPA Clean Air Markets Program, U.S. EPA Geospatial Applications, U.S. EPA Facilities Registry System (FRS), U.S. EPA Superfund Program, U.S. EPA Toxics Release Program (TRI), U.S. NIH NCI Surveillance, Epidemiology, and End Results Program (SEER), U.S. Nuclear Regulatory Commission (NRC).

== See also ==
- Hazardous Substances Data Bank
- Environmental health
