= List of environmental issues =

Environmental issues are harmful aspects of human activity on the biophysical environment. This alphabetical list is loosely divided into causes, effects and mitigation, noting that effects are interconnected and can cause new effects.

== Issues ==
- Greenhouse gas emissions — Coal-fired power station • Carbon dioxide • Methane • Fluorinated gases
- Human population — Biocapacity • Climate change • Carrying capacity • Exploitation • Industrialisation • I = PAT • Land degradation • Land reclamation • Optimum population • Overshoot (population) • Pollution and reproduction • Population density • Population dynamics • Population growth • Projections of population growth • Total fertility rate • Urbanization • Waste • Water conflict • Water scarcity • Overdrafting
- Hydrology — Environmental impacts of reservoirs • Tile drainage • Hydrology (agriculture) • Flooding • Landslide
- Intensive farming — Agricultural subsidy • Barn fires • Environmental effects of meat production • Intensive animal farming • Intensive crop farming • Irrigation • Monoculture • Nutrient pollution • Overgrazing • Pesticide drift • Plasticulture • Slash-and-burn • Tile drainage • Zoonosis
- Land use — Built environment • Desertification • Habitat fragmentation • Habitat destruction • Land degradation • Land pollution • Lawn-environmental concerns • Trail ethics • Urban heat island • Urban sprawl
- Nanotechnology — Impact of nanotechnology
- Natural disasters avalanches, droughts, earthquakes, floods, heat waves, landslides, tropical cyclones, volcanic activity
- Nuclear issues — Nuclear fallout • Nuclear meltdown • Nuclear power • Nuclear weapons • Nuclear and radiation accidents • Nuclear safety • High-level radioactive waste management
- Ocean trash — Garbage patch • Ghost net • Washed Ashore
- Water pollution

== Effects ==
- Climate change — Global warming • Global dimming • Fossil fuels • Sea level rise • Greenhouse gas • Ocean acidification • Shutdown of thermohaline circulation • Environmental impact of the coal industry • Urban heat islands • Flooding
- Environmental degradation — Loss of biodiversity • Habitat destruction • Invasive species
- Environmental health — Air quality • Asthma • Birth defect • Developmental disability • Endocrine disruptors • Environmental impact of the coal industry • Environmental impact of nanotechnology • Electromagnetic field • Electromagnetic radiation and health • Indoor air quality • Lead poisoning • Leukemia • Nanotoxicology • Nature deficit disorder • One Health • Sick building syndrome • Environmental impact of hydraulic fracturing
- Environmental issues with energy — Environmental impact of the coal industry • Environmental impact of the energy industry • Environmental impact of hydraulic fracturing
- Environmental impact of transport

Environmental impact of aviation
Environmental impact of the petroleum industry — Exhaust gas • Waste tires • Externalities of automobiles
Environmental impact of shipping (Cruise ships in Europe • Cruise ships in the United States)

- Environmental issues with war — Agent Orange • Depleted uranium • Military Superfund site (Category only) • Scorched earth • War and environmental law • Unexploded ordnance
- Overpopulation — Burial • Overpopulation in companion animals • Tragedy of the commons • Gender Imbalance in Developing Countries • Sub-replacement fertility levels in developed countries
- Mutation breeding — Genetic pollution
- Synthetic biology — Synthetic DNA • Artificially Expanded Genetic Information System • Hachimoji DNA
- Genetically modified food — Genetically modified crops • Genetically modified livestock • Genetically modified food controversies
- Pollution — Nonpoint source pollution • Point source pollution

Air pollution — Atmospheric particulate matter • Biological effects of UV exposure • CFC • Environmental impact of the coal industry • Environmental impact of hydraulic fracturing • Indoor air quality • Ozone depletion • Smog • Tropospheric ozone • Volatile organic compound • Ultrafine particles
Light pollution
Noise pollution
Soil pollution — Alkali soil • Brownfield • Residual sodium carbonate index • Soil conservation • Soil erosion • Soil contamination • Soil salination • Superfund • Superfund sites
Visual pollution
Water pollution — Acid rain • Agricultural runoff • Algal bloom • Environmental impact of the coal industry • Environmental impact of hydraulic fracturing • Eutrophication • Fish kill • Groundwater pollution • Groundwater recharge • Marine debris • Marine pollution • Mercury in fish • Microplastics • Nutrient pollution • Ocean acidification • Ocean dumping • Oil spills • Soda lake • Ship pollution • Thermal pollution • Urban runoff • Wastewater
Space pollution — Space debris • Interplanetary contamination

- Resource depletion — Exploitation of natural resources • Overdrafting (groundwater) • Overexploitation

Consumerism — Consumer capitalism • Planned obsolescence • Over-consumption
Fishing — Blast fishing • Bottom trawling • Cyanide fishing • Ghost nets • Illegal, unreported and unregulated fishing • Overfishing • Shark culling • Shark finning • Whaling
Logging — Clearcutting • Deforestation • Illegal logging
Mining — Acid mine drainage • Environmental impact of hydraulic fracturing • Mountaintop removal mining • Slurry impoundments
Water (depletion) — Anoxic waters • Aral Sea • California Water Wars • Dead Sea • Lake Chad • Water scarcity

- Toxicants — Agent Orange • Asbestos • Beryllium • Bioaccumulation • Biomagnification • Chlorofluorocarbons (CFCs) • Cyanide • DDT • Endocrine disruptors • Explosives • Environmental impact of the coal industry • Herbicides • Hydrocarbons • Perchlorate • Pesticides • Persistent organic pollutant • PBBs • PBDEs • Toxic heavy metals • PCB • Dioxin • Polycyclic aromatic hydrocarbons • Radioactive contamination • Volatile organic compounds
- Waste — Electronic waste • Great Pacific Garbage Patch • Illegal dumping • Incineration • Litter • Waste disposal incidents • Marine debris • Medical waste • Landfill • Leachate • Toxic waste • Environmental impact of the coal industry • Exporting of hazardous waste

== Mitigation ==
- Mitigation of aviation's environmental impact – Aviation taxation and subsidies (Air passenger tax • Jet fuel tax) • Electric aircraft • High-speed rail
- Conservation
  - Ecosystems — Anoxic waters • Biodiversity • Biosecurity • Coral bleaching • Black carbon • Edge effect • Habitat destruction • Organic farming • Habitat fragmentation • In-situ leach
  - Fishing — Blast fishing • Bottom trawling • By-catch • Cetacean bycatch • Gillnetting • Illegal, unreported and unregulated fishing • Environmental effects of fishing • Marine pollution • Overfishing • Whaling
  - Forests — Clearcutting • Deforestation • reforestation and afforestation • Illegal logging • Trail ethics
  - Natural resources — Resource depletion • Exploitation of natural resources • Steady-state economy • Waste hierarchy
  - Species — Endangered species • Genetic diversity • Habitat destruction • Holocene extinction • Invasive species • Poaching • Pollinator decline • Species extinction • Threshold host density • Wildlife trade • Wildlife disease
  - Energy conservation — Alternatives to car use • Efficient energy use • Carfree city • Energy hierarchy • Local food
  - Renewable energy — Renewable energy commercialization
  - Recreation — Protected areas
  - Water conservation
- Disaster mitigation
- Environmental law — Environmental crime • Environmental justice • Polluter pays principle • Precautionary principle • Regulatory capture • Trail ethics
- Phase-out of fossil fuel vehicles
  - Environmental aspects of the electric car
  - Hydrogen economy
  - Rail electrification
  - Scrappage program
  - Vehicle recycling
- Phase-out of single-use plastics
  - Phase-out of lightweight plastic bags (Australia • United States) • Biodegradable bags • Reusable shopping bag • Shopping trolley (caddy)
  - Bottled water ban — Reuse of bottles
  - Plastic straw ban
- Sustainable agriculture
  - Nutrition transition — Cellular agriculture (cultured meat) • Plant-based diet (reducitarianism • veganism • vegetarianism)
  - Integrated Pest Management

== See also ==
- Citizen science, cleanup projects that people can take part in.
- Environmental history
- Environmental history of Latin America
- Environmentalism
- Environmental racism
- Environmental racism in Europe
- Index of environmental articles
- List of conservation topics
- List of environmental disasters
- List of environmental organizations
- List of environmental organisations topics
- List of population concern organizations
- List of sustainability topics
- List of years in the environment
- Lists of environmental topics
- Millennium Ecosystem Assessment
