= The Killing Ground (film) =

1979 film

- Directed by: Steve Singer, Tom Priestley
- Written by: Brit Hume; Michael Connor; Steve Singer
- Produced by: Tom Priestley; Steve Singer
- Starring: EPA Officials Bill Sanjour and Hugh Kaufman; LA Governor Edwin Edwards; Environmentalist Lois Gibbs.
- Narrated by: Brit Hume (as Britt Hume)
- Cinematography: Greg Andracke
- Edited by: Pat Cook; Gerald Kline (as Gerald Klern); Walter Esserfeld
- Distributed by: ABC News
- Release date: 1979
- Running time: 50 minutes
- Country: United States
- Language: English

The Killing Ground is a 1979 American documentary film written by Brit Hume. It was nominated for an Academy Award for Best Documentary Feature.

== Summary ==
The film portrays environmental and human health effects of toxic waste dump-sites in Niagara Falls, New York and other locations.

== Synopsis ==
The film surveys several waste disposal sites in the United States.

=== Love Canal, New York ===
The documentary begins with the environmental disaster at Love Canal in Niagara Falls, New York. Governor of New York Hugh Carey provided $10 million in funding for residents nearest the canal to leave. The state purchased the houses of some residents.

The film features commentary on pollutant-linked birth defects by Dr. Beverly Paigen of the Roswell Park Institute (now the Roswell Park Comprehensive Cancer Center). Dr. Paigen collected statistics of diseases near Love Canal. Of 187 households still occupied near Love Canal, she documented "17 nervous breakdowns, 34 miscarriages, 20 birth defects, 41 cases of respiratory disease, and 3 suicides, all well above the national average." Dr. David Axelrod, former health commissioner of New York, then expanded the evacuations to include households with small children or pregnant women.

The film alleges that Hooker Chemical Company "never warned the state that dioxin was in the canal." In response, Bruce Davis, executive vice president of Hooker Chemical Company, states that "the quantity of dioxin that was located in that entire large canal site was a very, very low quantity."

However, a review of Hooker Chemical documents, obtained by ABC News, shows a list titled "Types of Waste Category" that appears to state which chemicals were dumped, and directly contradicts some statements by Davis. The film also reveals compromising statements by a Hooker Chemical employee, John Gibson.

Love Canal residents sued Hooker Chemical for "billions of dollars" in damages.

=== New Jersey ===
==== Kin-Buc landfill ====
ABC News applied the Freedom of Information Act to obtain footage from a 1976 United States government film showing trucks dumping "raw chemical waste" at Kin-Buc Landfill near Edison, New Jersey. Kin-Buc was allegedly subject to "frequent fires, which sent noxious smoke over the surrounding community." The film further shows that the nearby Raritan River has been contaminated by PCBs, chloroform, benzene, and mercury. However, due to the shutdown of Kin-Buc, there were no legal toxic waste dumps available to direct new waste to, nor to use for cleaning up Kin-Buc.

==== Illegal dumping ====
The film investigates illegal "midnight dumping" practices near the New Jersey Turnpike. One tactic involved stealing trucks, filling it with toxic waste barrels for payment, then abandoning the truck. The film alleges that one firm, Chemical Control Company (CCC), "simply unloaded drums into New Jersey's Meadowlands, pumped waste directly out of tank trucks into waterways, and mixed it with soil at the foot of a street so that seemingly harmless dirt could go to an ordinary garbage dump." The head of CCC, William Carracino, was facing two years in jail for illegal dumping when he gave an interview for the film. Carracino commented:

"Well, I'd say maybe 80 percent of most of the waste shipped is being dumped illegal. The economics behind it is, is if you don't have to treat it, there's no cost except transportation, and if you can get 20 and 30 dollars a drum for a chemical, and you can take it from a customer or a generator and carry it direct to a landfill or site, and dump it on the ground and bury it."

When asked about the amount of money that can be made, Carracino responded:

"Millions. You can go out and rent a piece of property. Don't buy it. Rent it. Rent ten acres, rent twenty acres. Get a permit to handle drums. Bring them onto the property, and just store em. As soon as the heat gets too great, just go bankrupt and get out. There's no law against it."

Carracino's Chemical Control Company remained on New Jersey's list of recommended waste disposal companies even after it was convicted of illegal dumping. A New Jersey chemical waste regulator was interviewed about CCC's tactics. Afterwards, the New Jersey Attorney General obtained a court order to close CCC.

In addition, the documentary follows a truck from New Jersey that allegedly dumps concealed barrels of carbolic acid at a household dump in Pennsylvania. Footage filmed by WNEP-TV shows the dumping operation.

Elsewhere, in the New Jersey Meadowlands, the improperly stored mercury waste of a former factory led to "the highest level of mercury contamination in the world."

==== Student protests ====
Elsewhere, students in Bordentown, New Jersey demonstrate against a potential chemical dump across from their high school. The landfill application has been filed by SCA Services, Incorporated. SCA had already been fined for illegally dumping chemicals at a household dump in Bordentown. ABC News demonstrated via SEC filings that SCA and the company that owns Kin-Buc Landfill had a partnership. Afterwards, SCA was included as a defendant in a lawsuit brought against the owners of Kin-Buc.

=== Louisiana ===
Petro Processors of Louisiana was a waste disposal company that served the petrochemical plants along the Mississippi River, including Exxon, Shell, Allied Chemical & Dye Company and Dow Chemical Company. However, a Petro dumpsite overflowed, "flooding 500 acres with waste", including carbon tetrachloride and hexachlorobutadiene.

The film includes an interview with Louisiana Governor Edwin Edwards, who said he was "close to the industrial complex because of its effect on the economy."

"We've made tradeoffs, accommodations, or compromises, if you will, taking the position that the need for jobs and industrial development and stimulation to our economy justified the temporary tradeoffs, and in some instances, some serious tradeoffs, where the environment became totally or partially damaged, and in some instances permanently."

"None of us, as far as I know, who are in positions of authority in the state apologize for that. We did what we thought was best for the people and the economy of Louisiana. We accommodated the industry where we thought we could, in order to get the jobs and the development, and in some instances we knowingly and advisedly accepted environmental tradeoffs."

Columbus Millet, resident of Bayou Sorrel, Louisiana, said that residents would occasionally wake up "choking" due to noxious air. Waste was supposedly being disposed via injection well, but was instead illegally dumped in open pits. A disposal worker died of asphyxiation after adding new waste into the pits, causing a chemical reaction.

=== Michigan ===
In Montague, Michigan, a Hooker Chemical plant allegedly caused "the worst environmental disaster in Michigan's history". Warren Dobson, former Hooker employee turned whistleblower, gives an interview.

=== Superfund ===
The film briefly mentions the attempts to pass the law that would become the Superfund.

William Sanjour, branch chief of waste reduction within the United States Environmental Protection Agency, alleged that "the [Carter] administration doesn't want to implement this [Superfund] law," and that the agency has been "systematically suppressing" environmental regulations.

An EPA program administrator commented:

The Carter administration's number one policy, as explained to us by top management, is to fight inflation. So, finding more sites where people are being poisoned, could contribute, in their mind, to their fight against inflation.

==== Future Superfund sites ====
A number of the polluted sites mentioned in the film became EPA Superfund sites after the documentary was published.

- Shakopee, Minnesota
- Lowell, Massachusetts
- Valley of the Drums in Bullitt County, Kentucky
- Love Canal in Niagara Falls, New York
- New Jersey Meadowlands
- Kin-Buc Landfill near Edison, New Jersey; also affecting nearby Raritan River
- Bayou Sorrel, Louisiana
- Bordentown, New Jersey
- Montague, Michigan, near White Lake Township, Michigan
- Bloody Run Creek dump in Hyde Park, New York
- Bridgeport, New Jersey

== See also ==
- Superfund
- Valley of the Drums
- Hazardous waste
- Pollution in the United States
