= 102nd Street chemical landfill =

Superfund site in New York, US

Hooker (102nd Street)
- Superfund site
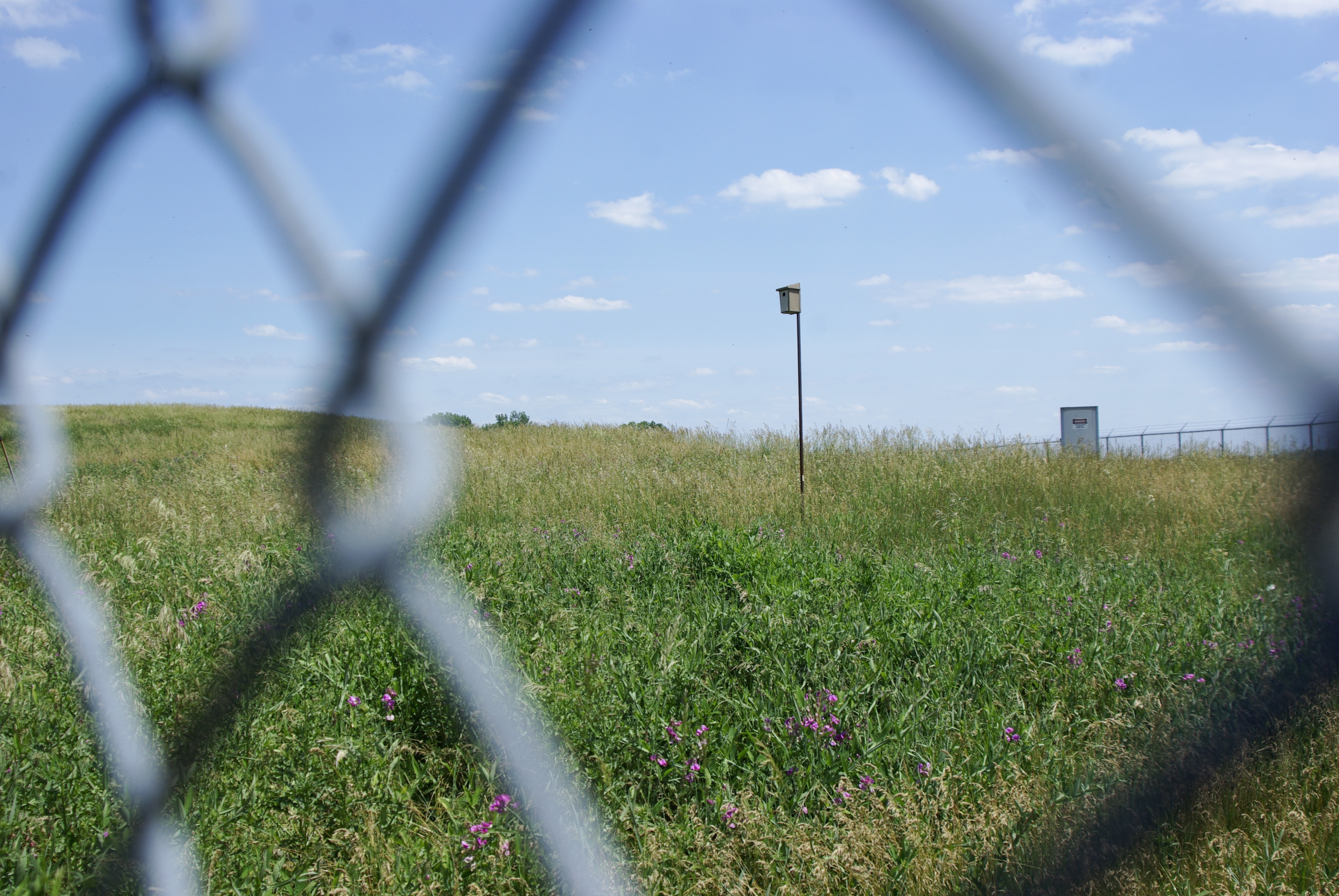
- The landfill in 2012

- Location within New York
- Location: Niagara Falls, Niagara County, New York; 43°04′25″N 78°56′55″W

Information
- CERCLIS ID: NYD980506810
- Responsible parties: Occidental Petroleum, Olin Corporation

Progress
- Proposed: 12/01/1982
- Listed: 09/01/1983
- Deleted: 08/05/2004

The 102nd Street chemical landfill is a former chemical landfill located on the Niagara River in Niagara Falls, New York. It is almost immediately adjacent to the infamous Love Canal chemical landfill, which are split from each other by the LaSalle Expressway and Frontier Avenue. Hooker Chemical Company, a subsidiary of Occidental Petroleum, and Olin Chemical, who were the original owners of the site, were ordered to clean up the site and pay $16,500,000 by the United States Environmental Protection Agency. It is a designated Superfund site, and is closed to the public.

== Site description ==
The 102nd Street landfill consists of two parcels, one owned by Olin Corporation and one owned by Hooker Chemical & Plastics Corporation at an area of 22.1 acres (89,000 m^{2}) total. Unlike Love Canal, which it is directly south of, the facility is still owned by Hooker (Occidental) and Olin, which are in the process of cleaning it up. It is part of the original canal excavation from which the Love Canal landfill takes its name. It currently appears to be a large field, as the chemicals are sealed off and buried underneath the soil. Griffon Park lies directly west, and currently, little residential development lies on either side of the area. The area is monitored with air and ground monitoring devices to measure the toxicity of the site.

At an unknown date, chemicals began seeping into the Niagara River. A concrete bulkhead has been constructed on the shore to stop the seepage of chemicals into the river. The area is fenced off by a six-foot-tall (1.8 m) chain-linked fence on all sides.

== History ==
The landfill takes its name from 102nd Street, a street that ran through the area before residents were evacuated and homes demolished.

The larger portion owned by Hooker was operated from 1943 until 1971. In that time period, 23,500 short tons (21,300 t) of mixed organic and/or inorganic compounds, solvents and phosphates, and related chemicals were dumped here including brine sludge, fly ash, electrochemical cell parts and related equipment plus 300 short tons (270 t) of hexachlorocyclohexane process cake, including lindane.

The smaller portion owned by Olin Corp. operated from 1948 to 1970. 6,600 short tons (6,000 t) of compounds and elements and an additional 20,000 short tons (18,000 t) of mercury brine and brine sludge, 1,000+ short tons (910+ t) tons of hazardous chemicals, 16 short tons (15 t) of concrete boiler ash, fly ash and other residual materials were deposited.

== See also ==
- Love Canal
- List of Superfund sites in New York
