= List of Superfund sites in New York =

Superfund sites in New York are designated under the Comprehensive Environmental Response, Compensation, and Liability Act (CERCLA). CERCLA, a federal law passed in 1980, authorized the United States Environmental Protection Agency (EPA) to create a list of polluted locations requiring a long-term response to clean up hazardous material contaminations. These locations are known as Superfund sites, and are placed on the National Priorities List (NPL). The NPL guides the EPA in "determining which sites warrant further investigation" for environmental remediation. As of October 2013, there were 87 Superfund sites on the NPL in New York. Two new sites have been proposed for addition to the list, and 26 sites have been deleted from the list following cleanup.

== Superfund sites ==
Proposed for addition to National Priorities List
Deleted from National Priorities List

Site Name	County	CERCLIS ID	Proposed	Listed	Map	Coordinates	Construction completed	Partially deleted	Reason	Deleted
American Thermostat Co.	Greene	NYD002066330	12/30/1982	09/08/1983	Link	42.273443, -73.955812	09/25/1998	–	Ground water contaminated with volatile organic compounds, including tetrachloroethylene (PCE) and trichloroethylene (TCE).	–
Griffiss Air Force Base	Oneida	NY4571924451	10/15/1984	07/22/1987	Link	43.232509, -75.413327	–	03/20/2009		–
Love Canal	Niagara	NYD000606947	12/30/1982	09/08/1983			09/29/1999	–		09/30/2004
Hudson River PCBs	Washington	NYD980763841	09/08/1983	09/21/1984			–	–		–
Onondaga Lake	Onondaga	NYD986913580	05/10/1993	12/16/1994			–	–		–
Pfohl Brothers Landfill	Erie	NYD980507495	05/10/1993	12/16/1994			09/27/2002	–		09/22/2008
Applied Environmental Services	Nassau	NYD980535652	10/15/1984	06/10/1986			06/28/1996	–		–
Seneca Army Depot	Seneca	NY0213820830	07/14/1989	08/30/1990			–	04/28/2008		–
Black River PCBs	Jefferson	NYN000206296	03/04/2010	09/29/2010			–	–		–
Dewey Loeffel Landfill	Rensselaer	NYD000512335	03/04/2010	03/10/2011			–	–		–
Hudson Technologies, Inc.	Rockland	NY0001392463	05/11/2000	–			–	–		–
Newtown Creek	Kings and Queens	NYN000206282	09/23/2009	09/27/2010			–	–		–
Brewster Well Field	Putnam	NYD980652275	12/30/1982	09/08/1983			04/11/1997	–		–
Brookhaven National Laboratory (USDOE)	Suffolk	NY7890008975	07/14/1989	11/21/1989			–	–		–
Byron Barrel & Drum	Genesee	NYD980780670								
Carroll & Dubies Sewage Disposal	Orange	NYD010968014								
Cayuga County Ground Water Contamination	Cayuga	NYN000204289								
Circuitron Corp.	Suffolk	NYD981184229								
Claremont Polychemical	Nassau	NYD002044584								
Colesville Municipal Landfill	Broome	NYD980768691								
Computer Circuits	Suffolk	NYD125499673								
Consolidated Iron and Metal	Orange	NY0002455756								
Cortese Landfill	Sullivan	NYD980528475								
Crown Cleaners of Watertown, Inc.	Jefferson	NYD986965333								
Diaz Chemical Corporation	Orleans	NYD067532580								
Ellenville Scrap Iron and Metal	Ulster	NYSFN0204190								
Endicott Village Well Field	Broome	NYD980780746								
Facet Enterprises, Inc.	Chemung	NYD073675514								
Flemm Lead Company	Queens	NYD000511857					–	–		–
FMC Corp. (Dublin Road Landfill)	Orleans	NYN000206669								
Forest Glen Mobile Home Subdivision	Niagara	NYD981560923								
Fulton Avenue	Nassau	NY0000110247								
Fulton Terminals	Oswego	NYD980593099								
GCL Tie & Treating Inc.	Delaware	NYD981566417								
GE Moreau	Saratoga	NYD980528335								
General Motors (Central Foundry Division)	St. Lawrence	NYD091972554								
Genzale Plating Co.	Nassau	NYD002050110								
Goldisc Recordings, Inc.	Suffolk	NYD980768717								
Gowanus Canal	Kings	NYN000206222	04/09/2009	03/04/2010			–	–		–
Haviland Complex	Dutchess	NYD980785661								
Hertel Landfill	Ulster	NYD980780779								
Hiteman Leather	Herkimer	NYD981560915								
Hooker (Hyde Park)	Niagara	NYD000831644	12/30/1982	09/08/1983			07/18/2003	–	Occidental Petroleum bought Hooker Chemical & Plastics Corp. in 1968.	–
Hooker (S Area)	Niagara	NYD980651087	12/30/1982	09/08/1983			09/18/2002	–	Occidental Petroleum bought Hooker Chemical & Plastics Corp. in 1968.	–
Hooker Chemical & Plastics Corp./Ruco Polymer Corp.	Nassau	NYD002920312	10/15/1984	06/10/1986			–	–	Occidental Petroleum bought Hooker Chemical & Plastics Corp. in 1968.	–
New Cassel/Hicksville Ground Water Contamination	Nassau	NY0001095363	03/10/2011	–			–	–		–
Hopewell Precision Area Contamination	Dutchess	NYD066813064								
Islip Municipal Sanitary Landfill	Suffolk	NYD980506901								
Jackson Steel	Nassau	NYD001344456	09/26/2016							
Johnstown City Landfill	Fulton	NYD980506927								
Jones Chemicals, Inc.	Livingston	NYD000813428								
Kentucky Avenue Well Field	Chemung	NYD980650667								
Lawrence Aviation Industries, Inc.	Suffolk	NYD002041531								
Lehigh Valley Railroad	Genesee	NYD986950251	07/28/1998	01/19/1999			–	–		–
Li Tungsten Corp.	Nassau	NYD986882660								
Liberty Industrial Finishing	Nassau	NYD000337295								
Little Valley	Cattaraugus	NY0001233634	10/02/1995	06/17/1996			09/29/2006	–		–
Ludlow Sand & Gravel	Oneida	NYD013468939								
MacKenzie Chemical Works, Inc.	Suffolk	NYD980753420								
Malta Rocket Fuel Area	Saratoga	NYD980535124	06/10/1986	07/22/1987			09/23/1999	–		–
Mattiace Petrochemical Co., Inc.	Nassau	NYD000512459								
Mercury Refining, Inc.	Albany	NYD048148175								
Mohonk Road Industrial Plant	Ulster	NYD986950012								
Nepera Chemical Co., Inc.	Orange	NYD000511451								
Niagara Mohawk Power Co. (Saratoga Springs)	Saratoga	NYD980664361								
Old Bethpage Landfill	Nassau	NYD980531727								
Old Roosevelt Field Contaminated Groundwater Area	Nassau	NYSFN0204234								
Olean Well Field	Cattaraugus	NYD980528657								
Pasley Solvents & Chemicals, Inc.	Nassau	NYD991292004								
Peninsula Boulevard Ground Water Plume	Nassau	NYN000204407								
Peter Cooper Landfill	Cattaraugus	NYD980530265	09/25/1997	03/06/1998			–	–		–
Peter Cooper Corporation (Markhams)	Cattaraugus	NYD980592547	04/23/1999	02/04/2000			11/25/2008	–		09/20/2010
Plattsburgh Air Force Base	Clinton	NY4571924774	07/14/1989	11/21/1989			–	–		–
Pollution Abatement Services	Oswego	NYD000511659								
Port Washington Landfill	Nassau	NYD980654206								
Preferred Plating Corp.	Suffolk	NYD980768774								
Ramapo Landfill	Rockland	NYD000511493								
Richardson Hill Road Landfill/Pond	Delaware	NYD980507735								
Robintech, Inc./National Pipe Co.	Broome	NYD002232957								
Rosen Brothers Scrap Yard/Dump	Cortland	NYD982272734								
Rowe Industries Gnd Water Contamination	Suffolk	NYD981486954								
Sarney Farm	Dutchess	NYD980535165								
Sealand Restoration, Inc.	St. Lawrence	NYD980535181								
Shenandoah Road Groundwater Contamination	Dutchess	NYSFN0204269	01/11/2001	06/14/2001			–	–		–
Sidney Landfill	Delaware	NYD980507677								
Sinclair Refinery	Allegany	NYD980535215								
Smithtown Ground Water Contamination	Suffolk	NY0002318889								
SMS Instruments, Inc.	Suffolk	NYD001533165	10/15/1984	06/10/1986			01/31/1996	–		09/13/2010
Solvent Savers	Chenango	NYD980421176								
Stanton Cleaners Area Ground Water Contamination	Nassau	NYD047650197								
Tri-Cities Barrel Co., Inc.	Broome	NYD980509285								
Vestal Water Supply Well 1-1	Broome	NYD980763767								
Volney Municipal Landfill	Oswego	NYD980509376								
Waste Management, Inc	Niagara	NYD049836679	09/1989						Hazardous waste constituents have been released to the fill/soil and groundwater beneath the facility, including volatile and semi-volatile organic compounds and polychlorinated biphenols (PCBs).	
York Oil Co.	Franklin	NYD000511733								
Action Anodizing, Plating, & Polishing Corp.	Suffolk	NYD072366453	06/24/1988	03/31/1989			06/30/1992	–		09/29/1995
Anchor Chemicals	Nassau	NYD001485226								
Batavia Landfill	Orleans	NYD980507693								
BEC Trucking	Broome	NYD980768675								
BioClinical Laboratories, Inc.	Suffolk	NYD980768683								
C & J Disposal Leasing Co. Dump	Madison	NYD981561954								
Clothier Disposal	Oswego	NYD000511576								
Conklin Dumps	Broome	NYD981486947								
Hooker (102nd Street)	Niagara	NYD980506810								
Jones Sanitation	Dutchess	NYD980534556								
Katonah Municipal Well	Westchester	NYD980780795								
Kenmark Textile Corp.	Suffolk	NYD075784165								
Marathon Battery Corp.	Putnam	NYD010959757								
Niagara County Refuse	Niagara	NYD000514257								
North Sea Municipal Landfill	Suffolk	NYD980762520								
Radium Chemical Co., Inc.	Queens	NYD001667872								
Suffern Village Well Field	Rockland	NYD980780878								
Syosset Landfill	Nassau	NYD000511360								
Tronic Plating Co., Inc.	Suffolk	NYD002059517								
Vestal Water Supply Well 4-2	Broome	NYD980652267								
Warwick Landfill	Orange	NYD980506679								
Wide Beach Development	Erie	NYD980652259								

== See also ==
- List of Superfund sites in the United States
- List of environmental issues
- List of waste types
- TOXMAP
