= William Sanjour =

American whistleblower

William "Bill" Sanjour (1930s— ) worked at the Environmental Protection Agency and was a whistleblower.

== Early life ==
William Sanjour was born in The Bronx, New York City. His mother died early on in his life, while he was still a child. His father was a carpenter from Russia and a member of the Industrial Workers of the World. Sanjour, in his own words, "come[s] from a long line of people who would not be cowed when they are right."

He attended the City College of New York. In 1960, he graduated from Columbia University with a master's degree in physics.

His first career was as an operations research analyst in the Navy, after which he held several jobs until he became a manager consultant at Ernst & Ernst. At Ernst & Ernst, he conducted studies for a client affiliated with the US National Air Pollution Control Administration in the late 1960s.

In 1967, with Ellison Burton, while both were computer modelers for the US National Air Pollution Control Administration, he proposed cap-and-trade (in different verbiage) as a means to control sulfur dioxide emissions. In 1972, they continued refining the cap-and-trade model at the newly created Environmental Protection Agency, and it was proposed to Congress in the EPA's annual report.

== RCRA ==
He became branch chief of the Hazardous Waste Management Division in 1974, which had about 22 people in it, and contributed to the passing of the Resource Conservation and Recovery Act. After its 1976 passage, Sanjour was responsible for drafting regulations for the storage, treatment, and disposal of hazardous waste.

On June 15, 1978, new orders were delivered by Sanjour's boss, John Lehman, from the "politically appointed office director", Thomas Jorling, insisting that the federal budget had to be reduced on President Jimmy Carter's orders, and, as such, that the Hazardous Waste Management Division had to be reduced in scope: the petroleum industry, among others, was not to be covered by regulations, which were not to be based on whether waste caused cancer or birth defects, or was poisonous or radioactive. Reasonable-sounding rationales were to be invented for the changes, and the staff were 'warned' not to inform the public of this.

Because of pressure from the White House to fight inflation, we were directed to avoid regulating hazardous waste from the oil and gas industry, electric power companies, and other large industries. We were told to do things which we knew were not right. We were required to write public documents which we knew were misleading.

— William Sanjour, "The Politics of Pollution | News | The Harvard Crimson"

Initially, Sanjour sought to enforce the spirit of the RCRA internally, but the EPA transferred him to a position with 'no duties' in 1979, in a department with 'no people and no function'. He then went to Congress, the press, and various environmental groups.

== Center for Health, Environment, and Justice ==
Lois Gibbs founded the Center for Health, Environment, and Justice in 1981 as an extension of her Love Canal activism. She asked Sanjour to be an unpaid technical advisor for the CHEJ, and he accepted; he then began flying to speak to environmental groups.

== Later life ==
Sanjour retired in 2001 to live in Arlington County, Virginia.

As of 2017, Sanjour was on the Board of Directors of the National Whistleblowers Center.

== Awards ==
- Association of Certified Fraud Examiners' Cliff Robertson Sentinel Award - 2007
