= Bowmansville, New York =

- Hamlet
- Location within the state of New York
- Coordinates: 42°56′27″N 78°41′5″W
- Country: United States
- State: New York
- County: Erie
- Town: Lancaster
- Time zone: UTC-5 (Eastern (EST))
  - Summer (DST): UTC-4 (EDT)
- ZIP code: 14026
- Area code: 716

Bowmansville is a hamlet located in the town of Lancaster in Erie County, New York, United States. It is named after Benjamin Bowman, the owner of sawmills on Ellicott Creek in the center of the hamlet.

== Geography ==
Bowmansville is located at 42°56′27″N 78°41′5″W (42.562793, -78.410556). Bowmansville is in the northwest corner of the town and is centered on the Genesee Street Bridge (NY Route 33) over a cataract in Ellicott Creek. Downstream from Bowmansville, in the town of Cheektowaga, bordered by Ellicott Creek, is the Pfohl Brothers Landfill, a Superfund site. It is a suburb of Buffalo, NY.

== History ==
The first settlers of the town of Lancaster, as near as can be ascertained, were James and Asa Woodward, in 1803, in Bowmansville. In 1808 a road was cut from Buffalo through Lancaster village eastward, and in the same year Daniel Robinson built the first sawmill in town at Bowmansville. Circa 1810, Benjamin Bowman purchased this mill and built another, and since then the place has been designated by his name. The gristmills were owned by the Bowman family for approximately fifty years; the gristmill passed to John Pentelow and is now abandoned. Bowmansville also had a train station for the West Shore Railroad, just off Maple Drive north of the hamlet.

== Services ==
Bowmansville contains the Bowmansville Volunteer Fire Department, located at 36 Main Street.

== Major highways ==
- Interstate 90 (New York State Thruway): east–west tollway that passes just north of the hamlet
- New York State Route 78 (Transit Road): north–south highway that marks the west edge of the hamlet
- New York State Route 33 (Genesee Street): east–west Highway through the hamlet from the Lancaster town line on the west to the town line on the east
