= Model City, New York =

Hamlet in New York, United States

Coordinates: 43°11′06″N 78°59′01″W

Model City is a hamlet in the town of Lewiston in Niagara County, New York, United States.

== History ==
It was proposed in the 1890s as an urban utopia by railroad lawyer and con man William T. Love (born 26 May 1856 in Keokuk, Iowa), who had tried a similar investment scheme in Huron, South Dakota, earlier in 1890. He planned Model City as "The most beautiful [park] in the world" with housing for more than one million people, a canal and hydroelectric plant. Love promised in his advertising pamphlets that the city would be free of smog-filled skies, that the land would be beautifully landscaped, housing and quality of life would be a cut above even the loveliest urban environments.

However, his plans were never realized, despite the approval of the state government in 1893. Amid the panic of 1894 his investors backed out and development stopped, with the only visitors to Model City being "curious reporters and bill collectors," trying to find an absent Love. He claimed to have left for England in 1897 seeking foreign investment. Instead, having absconded with an unknown amount of money, he practiced law in Cordova, Alaska, for several years, then attempted to start a new model city scheme in the Puget Sound area before settling on Lomax, Illinois, in 1911. By 1914 "New Lomax" went bust, with Love netting $250,000. In 1929 he tried once more, claiming to have 15,000 acres (6,100 ha) for "New City," Delaware, which similarly failed to materialize.

By the mid-1990s, Model City was "little more than a rural road with a few dozen families" and a bar. Despite its environmentally-friendly concept, Model City became home to an enormous landfill owned by Waste Management.

=== Connection to Love Canal ===
The name Love Canal was taken from the name of William T. Love. His "Love's Canal", meant to connect the two levels of the Niagara River, was to anchor this booming Model City as a shipping lane. He abandoned the idea after digging only 4,600 feet of his canal, which was within the modern city of Niagara Falls. He had also constructed a few streets before creditors repossessed the construction equipment and the last of his property in 1910.

This same canal, after being used as a toxic waste dump holding more than 20,000 tons of chemical waste, had a school and a neighborhood built on top of it. It subsequently became a major environmental disaster that was exposed in the 1970s.

== See also ==
- Huron, South Dakota
