= Valley of the Drums =

Toxic waste site in Kentucky

- Superfund site
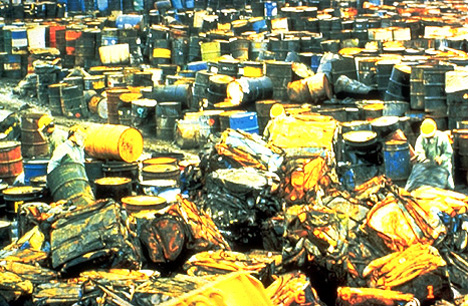
- The Valley of the Drums, c. 1980 (credit: EPA)

- Location within Kentucky
- Location: Bullitt County, Kentucky; 38°04′56″N 85°43′25″W

Information
- CERCLIS ID: KYD980500961
- Responsible parties: A.L. Taylor (inferred)

Progress
- Proposed: December 30, 1982
- Listed: September 8, 1983
- Construction completed: August 10, 1990
- Deleted: May 17, 1996

The Valley of the Drums, officially known as the A.L. Taylor (Valley of Drums) Superfund Site, is a 23-acre (9.3 hectare) toxic waste site near Brooks in northern Bullitt County, Kentucky, near Louisville, named after the waste-containing drums strewn across the area. After it had been collecting waste since the 1960s, the United States Environmental Protection Agency (EPA) analyzed the property and creek in 1979, finding high levels of heavy metals, polychlorinated biphenyls, and some 140 other chemical substances. It is known as one of the primary motivations for the passage of the Comprehensive Environmental Response, Compensation, and Liability Act, or Superfund Act, of 1980. Officially, cleanup began at the site in 1983 and ended in 1990, though later problems have been reported and investigated.

== History ==
=== Dumping and pollution ===
The Valley of the Drums is a 23-acre (9.3-hectare) toxic waste site in Brooks, Kentucky, in northern Bullitt County, near Louisville. It became a collection point for toxic wastes starting sometime in the 1960s. It caught the attention of state officials when some of the drums caught fire and burned for more than a week in 1966. At that time, there were no laws to address the storage or containment of toxic wastes, and the site continued to be unregulated for another decade. In 1977, the owner (also inferred to be the primary "dumper") of the site, A. L. Taylor, died. It is unclear who owned the property subsequently, and county tax records show that the property taxes had gone unpaid for several years.

In 1978, a Kentucky Department of Natural Resources and Environmental Protection (KDNREP) investigation of the property revealed that over 100,000 waste drums were delivered to the site, of which 27,000 drums were buried, and the remaining containers were discharged directly into pits and trenches. Over time, many of the drums on site deteriorated, and the contents spilled onto the ground, where they were flushed into a nearby creek by storm water runoff. Frequent complaints about strong odors along the creek bed were received from adjacent property owners.

=== Cleanup and legislation ===
In 1979, large quantities of contaminants were carried into the creek by the spring snowmelt, which finally caused the EPA to respond. The EPA analyzed the property and creek, finding high levels of heavy metals, polychlorinated biphenyls, and some 140 other chemical substances. The same year, the EPA initiated an emergency cleanup of the worst leaking drums. Workers on the ground quickly realized that the scope of the problem was far beyond their abilities. After news of the problems there became public, the site was used by members of Congress as one of the reasons the proposed Superfund law was needed. While the widely publicized Love Canal disaster is often credited as the reason the Superfund law was passed, Love Canal activist Lois Gibbs has said that Love Canal looked like a suburban community, while "Valley of the Drums became the visualization of the problem."

Cleanup began at the site in 1983 and officially ended in 1990, although problems continued to be reported for many years. An environmental audit of the site in 2003 found PCBs in the sediment surrounding the area, and further testing was ordered.

In December 2008, EPA inspectors found about four dozen rusted metal drums on land just outside the part of the dump that it capped and fenced in the 1980s, including a portion of Jefferson Memorial Forest, in an area that became known as the Gully of the Drums. Shield Environmental Associates was retained by the Louisville Metro Council in March 2026 to facilitate cleanup of this area.

== See also ==
- List of Superfund sites in the United States
- Hazardous waste in the United States
- Cancer Alley
