= William Ginsberg =

American environmentalist

William Ginsberg (1930–2006) was an attorney, environmentalist, author and professor of environmental law. Ginsberg served as commissioner of parks and recreation in New York City, to which post he was appointed by Mayor John Lindsay in 1968.

Ginsberg litigated a landmark case in environmental law decided by the highest court in New York State, called Mohonk v. Town of Gardiner (N.Y. 1979), a case which involved the Mohonk Preserve in Ulster County, New York, and established the proposition that a nature preserve protected by a conservation easement could qualify for a tax deduction. The case served as the foundation for the preservation of open space as a public good on the grounds that open space served an educational purpose.

Ginsberg served as the hearing officer for the New York state panel investigating the Love Canal pollution site in 1979. He authored the state's report on the site.

He was co-author of Environmental Law and Regulation in New York, the leading treatise on the subject.

He attended Antioch College, Yale Law School, and practiced law in New York City with the law firms of Ginsberg, Schwab & Goldberg, as well as Sive, Paget & Riesel. He served as Distinguished Professor Emeritus at Hofstra University School of Law.
