= Forest Legacy Program =

The Forest Legacy Program was established in the 1990 United States farm bill to protect environmentally important forest lands that are threatened by conversion to nonforest uses. It provides federal funding for conservation easements and fee simple purchases.

== Program purpose ==
To ascertain and protect environmentally important forest areas that are threatened by conversion to nonforest uses

Development of the nation's forested areas poses an increasing threat to maintaining the integrity of our country's valuable forest lands. Intact forest lands supply timber products, wildlife habitat, soil and watershed protection, aesthetics, and recreational opportunities. However, as these areas are fragmented and disappear, so do the benefits they provide. While local governments commonly guide development away from the most sensitive areas through traditional land use controls (like zoning and performance standards), sometimes these measures are not sufficient to fully protect the forested component of our natural resource base.

The Forest Legacy Program (FLP), a federal program in partnership with states, supports state efforts to protect environmentally sensitive forest lands. Designed to encourage the protection of privately owned forest lands, FLP is an entirely voluntary program. To maximize the public benefits it achieves, the program focuses on the acquisition of partial interests in privately owned forest lands. FLP helps the states develop and carry out their forest conservation plans. It encourages and supports the acquisition of conservation easements, legally binding agreements transferring a negotiated set of property rights from one party to another, without removing the property from private ownership. Most FLP conservation easements restrict development, require sustainable forestry practices, and protect other values.

== Program description ==
The Forest Legacy Program is a partnership between participating States and the USDA Forest Service to identify and protect environmentally important forest land that is threatened by conversion to nonforest uses.

Conservation easements are the primary tool used to achieve this goal. Priority is given to lands that have important scenic or recreational values; riparian areas; fish and wildlife values, including threatened and endangered species; or other ecological values.

== Program characteristics ==
The program helps States and regions identify important forest areas.

When conservation easements are used, the land remains privately owned.

Other tools include full-fee purchase, voluntary deed restrictions, covenants, and agreements.

The program is based on a "willing seller and willing buyer" concept.

State and local partners select priority tracts in cooperation with the Forest Service.

The interests in land may be held by the Federal government, or by the State or a unit of local government if the State chooses to select the State Grant Option as authorized by the 1996 Farm Bill.

When the Federal government holds the easement, State or local units of government agree to administer the lands or interests in lands.

The lands and interests are held in perpetuity. There is no loss of the Federal investment resulting from change of ownership.

Forest Stewardship Plans that meet the landowner's objectives for natural resource management are prepared on all privately owned tracts.

The tracts acquired can remain "working forests" and can forever provide forest resources to meet the needs of the local community and the Nation

== FLP partner roles ==
The Federal role The significance of the public benefits of a particular forest ranges from local to national. Larger forests tend to be nationally significant because the values they provide are becoming more rare. Extensive forest areas are often subject to the additional challenge of multiple ownerships and numerous political jurisdictions. Through the Forest Legacy Program, the Federal government helps State and local governments look beyond their political boundaries to identify important forest areas. The Federal government provides oversight, and financial and technical assistance to help protect important forests.

The State role States integrate partner resources to cooperatively protect and maintain a forest land base. The lead agency, usually the State forestry organization, carries out the FLP in the State. Responsibilities include the following:

Collect information to identify and delineate important forest areas that may be selected as Forest Legacy Areas.

Consult with the State Forest Stewardship Coordinating Committee to achieve program purposes.

Address land protection and forest management issues.

Conduct land acquisition activities

Integrate policies and incentives to conserve a forest land base.

Hold and administering the lands or interests in land that enter the Forest Legacy Program.

Monitor tracts for program compliance.

The State Forest Stewardship Coordinating Committee Role The State Forest Stewardship Coordinating Committee is identified in the Cooperative Forestry Assistance Act. The committee's consulting and recommending duties for the Forest Legacy Program are identified in the act and the FLP guidelines, and include the following:

Prioritize lands for inclusion in the FLP.

Establish eligibility criteria and recommends Forest Legacy Areas in the Assessment of Need process.

Advise the State lead agency in order to achieve Forest Legacy Program objectives.

The Nongovernmental Organization (Land Trust) Role Nongovernmental organizations, specifically land trusts or similar organizations, have a distinct relationship with the FLP. Because of their compatible interest in protecting land for conservation purposes, land trusts can be a primary contact with landowners to negotiate the purchase of conservation easements and to monitor the conservation easements once they are enrolled in the FLP. Lands acquired by or donated to land trusts may be counted toward the non-Federal cost-share amount of total program costs, provided the interests in lands contribute to the goals of the Forest Legacy Program and the lands are located within a Forest Legacy Area.

The Landowner Role Landowner participation in the FLP is voluntary. A landowner joins the program either by conveying interests in lands to achieve the conservation objectives of the FLP or by purchasing or inheriting land that has already been committed to an FLP conservation easement. The landowner becomes a primary practitioner in maintaining the forest land base by implementing management activities to conserve the values for which the land entered the program.

== Program activities ==
Forest Legacy complements private, federal and state programs focusing on conservation in two ways. First, FLP directly supports property acquisition. Additionally, FLP supports efforts to acquire donated conservation easements. FLP funded acquisitions serve public purposes identified by participating states and agreed to by the landowner.

On May 18, 2009 US Forest Service chief announced land grants to protect more than 5,000 acres (20 km^{2}) of forest in northern Vermont. The land is going to be conserved with the help of a $1.8 million under the Eden Forest project.

== Eligibility ==
Participation in Forest Legacy is limited to private forest landowners. To qualify, landowners are required to prepare a multiple resource management plan as part of the conservation easement acquisition. The federal government may fund up to 75% of program costs, with at least 25% coming from private, state or local sources. In addition to gains associated with the sale or donation of property rights, many landowners also benefit from reduced taxes associated with limits placed on land use.

== Program administration ==
The USDA Forest Service administers the Forest Legacy Program in cooperation with State Foresters. The state grant option allows states a greater role in implementing the program. FLP also encourages partnerships with local governments and land trusts, recognizing the important contributions landowners, communities and private organizations make to conservation efforts.
