= Conservation easement =

Type of legal arrangement applying to land

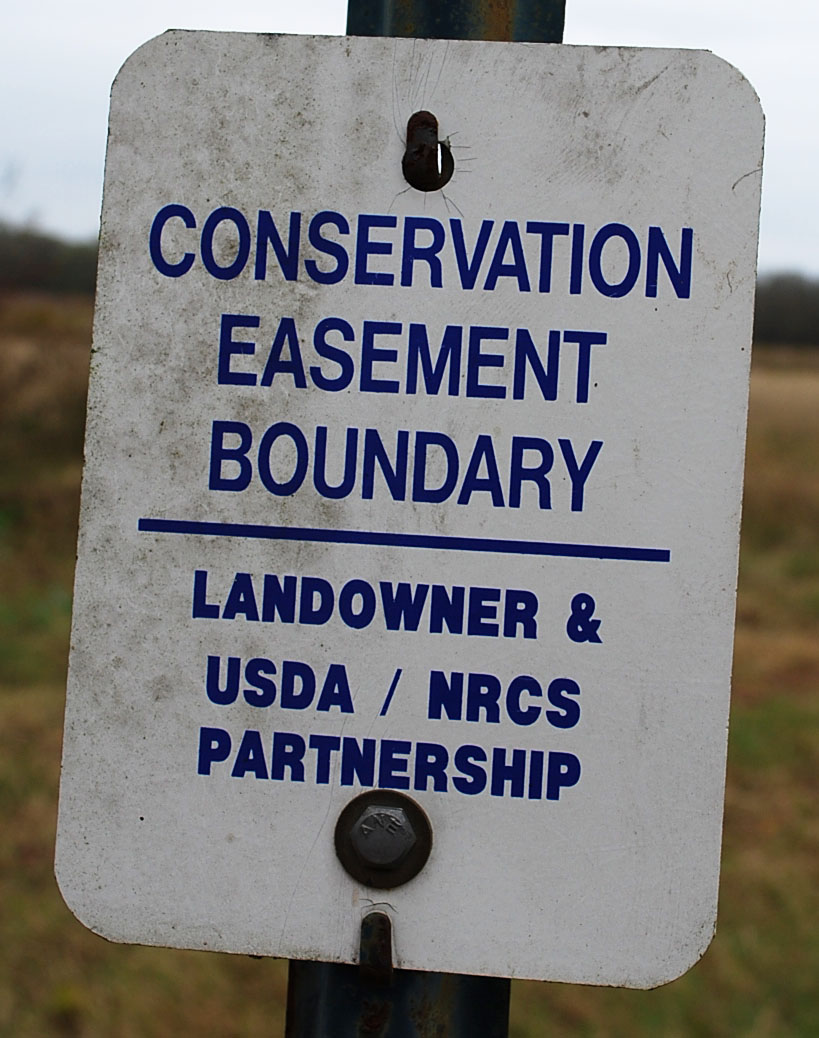
Conservation easement boundary sign

In the United States, a conservation easement (also called conservation covenant, conservation restriction or conservation servitude) is a power vested in a nonprofit organization called a land trust, or a governmental entity to restrict, as to a specified land area, the exercise of rights otherwise held by a landowner so as to achieve certain conservation purposes. It is an interest in real property established by agreement between a landowner and land trust or unit of government. The conservation easement "runs with the land", meaning it is applicable to both present and future owners of the land. The grant of conservation easement, as with any real property interest, is part of the chain of title for the property and is normally recorded in local land records.

The conservation easement's purposes will vary depending on the character of the particular property, the goals of the land trust or government unit, and the needs of the landowners. For example, an easement's purposes (often called "conservation objectives") might include any one or more of the following:

- Maintain and improve water quality;
- Perpetuate and foster the growth of healthy forest;
- Maintain and improve wildlife habitat and migration corridors;
- Protect scenic vistas visible from roads and other public areas; or
- Ensure that lands are managed so that they are always available for sustainable agriculture and forestry.

The conservation easement's administrative terms for advancing the conservation objectives also vary but typically forbid or substantially constrain subdivision and other real estate development.

The most distinguishing feature of the conservation easement as a conservation tool is it enables users to achieve specific conservation objectives on the land, while keeping the land in the ownership of landowners for uses consistent with the conservation objectives.

Unlike land use regulation, a conservation easement is placed on property voluntarily by the owner whose rights are being restricted. The restrictions of the easement, once set in place, are usually perpetual, and reduce the market value of the property. Appraisals of the value of the easement, and financial arrangements between the parties (land owner and land trust), generally are kept private.

The landowner who grants a conservation easement continues to manage and otherwise privately own the land and may receive significant state and federal tax advantages for having donated and/or sold the conservation easement. In granting the conservation easement, the easement holder has a responsibility to monitor future uses of the land to ensure compliance with the terms of the easement, and to enforce the terms if a violation occurs.

Although a conservation easement prohibits certain uses by the landowner, such an easement does not make the land public. On the contrary, many conservation easements confer no use of the land either to the easement holder or to the public. Furthermore, many conservation easements reserve to the landowner specific uses, which if not reserved would be prohibited. Some conservation easements confer specific uses to the easement holder or to the public. These details are spelled out in the legal document that creates the conservation easement.

== Income tax deductions ==
Landowners in the United States who donate a "qualifying" conservation easement to a "qualified" land protection organization under § 170(h) of the Internal Revenue Code may be eligible for a federal income tax deduction equal to the value of their donation. The value of the easement donation, as determined by a qualified appraiser, equals the difference between the fair market value of the property before and after the easement takes effect.

To qualify for this income tax deduction, the easement must be: a) perpetual; b) held by a qualified governmental or non-profit organization; and, c) serve a valid "conservation purpose", meaning the property must have an appreciable natural, scenic, historic, scientific, recreational, or open space value. As a result of legislation in 2006 and 2007, conservation easement donors were able to deduct the value of their gift at the rate of 50% of their adjusted gross income (AGI) per year. Landowners with 50% or more of their income from agriculture were able to deduct the donation at a rate of 100% of their AGI. Any amount of the donation remaining after the first year could be carried forward for fifteen additional years (allowing a maximum of sixteen years within which the deduction may be utilized), or until the amount of the deduction has been used up, whichever comes first. With the passage of the Farm Bill in the summer of 2008 these expanded federal income tax incentives were extended such that they also apply to all conservation easements donated in 2008 and 2009. The provision was renewed annually each year between 2010 and 2014 and was finally incorporated to the tax code without an expiration date in 2015.

== Income tax credits (states) ==
Land conservation advocates have tried to enact additional tax incentives for easements, above the federal charitable deduction. Some states have granted credits that can be used to pay state income tax to donors of qualified conservation easements. In 1983, North Carolina became the first state to establish such a program.

The Nature Conservancy promoted the state tax credit idea widely in the 1990s. In 1999, four state legislatures enacted state tax credit programs (Virginia, Delaware, Colorado, and Connecticut, in that order). South Carolina and California followed in 2000. Several other states have followed since.

For landowners with little income subject to state taxation, a tax credit is of little value and may be insufficient incentive to grant a conservation easement. For this reason, some states, including Colorado and Virginia, have made the state tax credit transferable; the landowner can sell their credit to someone else. The buyer can use the purchased tax credit, normally purchased at a discount, against their own Colorado income tax.

In the states where credit for conservation land donations is transferable, brokerages have arisen. The federal and state tax treatment of profits from sale and use of transferable tax credits has been the subject of extensive discussion and the issuance of several guidance documents by the Internal Revenue Service.

The New Mexico state income tax credit started effective in 2004. New transferability legislation, effective January 1, 2008, applies retroactively to conservation easements effected from January 1, 2004.

The Virginia transferable credit program is the largest among the states in dollar value of property conserved. By the end of 2010, $2,512,000,000 of property value had been donated as easements in Virginia for which tax credit was claimed. The qualifying easements cover over 516,000 acres (2,090 km^{2}) of Virginia landscape. The Virginia program now (2011) grants about $110 million of new tax credit each year. The credit allowance is 40% of the appraised value of the easement donation, so this equates to $275 million of property value donated per year for protection of wildlife habitat, farmland and woodland, and scenic open space.

== Estate tax reductions and exclusions ==
For landowners who will leave sizable estates upon their death, the most important financial impact of a conservation easement may be a significant reduction in estate taxes. Estate taxes often make it difficult for heirs to keep land intact and in the family because of high estate tax rates and high development value of land. It may be necessary to subdivide or sell land for development in order to pay these taxes which may not be the desire of the landowner or their heirs. A conservation easement can often provide significant help with this problem in three important ways:

1. Reduction in value of the estate. The deceased's estate will be reduced by the value of the donated conservation easement. As a result, taxes will be lower because heirs will not be required to pay taxes on the extinguished development rights. In other words, heirs will only have to pay estate taxes on preserved farmland values, and not full development values.
2. Estate exclusion. Section 2031(c) of the tax code provides further estate tax incentives for properties subject to a donated conservation easement. When property has a qualified conservation easement placed upon it, up to an additional 40% of the value of land (subject to a $500,000 cap) may be excluded from the estate when the landowner dies. This exclusion is in addition to the reduction in land value attributable to the easement itself as described above.
3. After death easement. Heirs may also receive these benefits (but not the income tax deduction) by electing to donate a conservation easement after the landowner's death and prior to filing the estate return (called a "post mortem" election).

In Pennsylvania, conservation restrictions on land included in the estate can reduce the inheritance tax owed.

== Property tax incentives ==
Many states offer property tax incentives to conservation easement donors.

== Issues to consider ==
As is the case with any property interest, a conservation easement may be taken by eminent domain, when the public value of the proposed project exceeds that of the conservation interest being protected by the easement. For example, a conservation easement may be for a long term (such as 30 years), or in perpetuity (forever).

Conservation easements may result in a significant reduction in the sale price of the land, because a builder can no longer develop it. This difference in value is a major reason for the granting of the original tax incentives. An estimate of 35%–65% value reduction has been made on conservation easement land to the land owner.

The cost-effectiveness of either a conservation easement or eminent domain depends on various economic and ecological conditions, which need to be closely considered.

Recently, the U.S. Tax Court has penalized taxpayers for overstating the value of the easement.

== Purchase of conservation easements ==
Many conservation easements are purchased with funds from federal, state, and local governments, nonprofit organizations, or private donors. In these cases, landowners are paid directly for the purchase of the conservation easement.

The Farm Bill, updated every five or more years, provides an important source of funds for conservation easement purchase. The 2014 Farm Bill created the Agricultural Conservation Easement Program (ACEP) by consolidating the Farm and Ranch Lands Protection Program, the Grassland Reserve Program, and the Wetlands Reserve Program. Under ACEP, the Natural Resources Conservation Service helps tribes, state and local governments, and land trusts protect agriculture from development and other non-agricultural uses. ACEP includes Agricultural Land Easements and Wetland Reserve Easements. Agricultural land easements preserve land for food production and aid in soil and water conservation. Wetland reserve easements aim to restore wetland areas that have been converted into agricultural land. To maximize the benefits, the program targets land that has both a high chance of restoration success and a history of low crop yields or crop failure. The Farm Bill also funds the purchase of conservation easements for forestland. The Forest Legacy Program is a voluntary Federal program in partnership with States which protects privately owned forest lands. Landowners are required to prepare a multiple resource management plan as part of the conservation easement acquisition.

The majority of states have direct funding sources for conservation. Commonly used funding sources include real estate transfer tax, legislative bonds, and lottery proceeds. For instance, in 2014, New Jersey added conservation funding from corporate business taxes through constitutional amendment, approved by 65% of voters. Many states and counties have programs for the purchase of agricultural conservation easements (PACE) to protect productive farmland from non-agricultural development. In 1974, Suffolk County in New York enacted the first PACE (also known as purchase of development rights or PDR) program. King County in Washington and the states of Maryland, Massachusetts, and Connecticut quickly followed suit. As of 2016, the PACE program operates in 32 states through both state and local programs.

== National Conservation Easement Database ==
The National Conservation Easement Database maps conservation easements and provides a resource for understanding what resources conservation easements protect in the U.S. As of 2018, the National Conservation Easement Database included over 130,000 conservation easements on 24.7 million acres.

== Criticism ==
In 2017, Fortune published an investigative report by ProPublica criticizing the continuing use of conservation easements as a tax avoidance scheme, which causes the government to lose billions of dollars in tax revenues, thus raising taxes for middle-class and working individuals.

== See also ==
- Easement refuge
- Fee tail
- Freedom to roam
- Land use
- Malpai Borderlands
- Natural landscape
- Prime farmland
- Sangre de Cristo Land Grant
- William Ginsberg, attorney who litigated pioneering case regarding tax deductibility of conservation easements
