= Hooker Chemical Company =

American chemical production company

- Type: Private
- Industry: Chemicals
- Founded: 1903; 123 years ago in Rochester, New York, United States
- Defunct: 1968
- Fate: Acquired by Occidental Petroleum
- Area served: United States
- Products: Chloralkali products
- Parent: Occidental Petroleum

Hooker Chemical Company (or Hooker Electrochemical Company) was an American firm producing chloralkali products that was active from 1903 to 1968. The company became notorious in 1977, when residents near its chemical waste site, Love Canal, reported extraordinarily high incidences of leukemia, birth defects, and other injuries. Although Hooker had sold its old chemical waste dump site to the Niagara Falls School Board in 1953, the company was held responsible as a result of a lawsuit thereafter.

== History ==
=== Founding ===
Founded in 1903 as "the Development and Funding Company" by Elon Huntington Hooker, of Rochester, NY, the company used the Townsend cell to electrolyse salt into chlorine and sodium hydroxide (NaOH; also known as "caustic soda" and "lye"), in a chloralkali process. Elmer Sperry, founder of Sperry Electric, and Leo Baekeland, inventor of Bakelite and Velox photographic paper, consulted Hooker to improve the design of the cell.

The company was sited in Niagara Falls, NY foremost because of the low-cost electricity from the Niagara Falls power project, but also because of the abundance of salt from nearby mines, and availability of water from the Niagara River.

=== First product lines ===
Chlorine, used for sanitation and the chlorination of drinking water, was sold as chlorinated lime and chlorobenzene, which was an ingredient for an explosive used in World War I. Later, solvents like trichloroethylene and phenol were sold for use by the subsidiary degreasing and dry cleaning company Detrex. Hooker licensed his diaphragm cell technology to other chloralkali producers.

In 1918, Hooker formed a company to hydrogenate vegetable oils, while Hooker Chemical also began producing sulfur chloride and sodium chlorate.

In 1922, Hooker bought the S. Wander & Sons Company for the retail sales of lye and chlorinated lime. Samuel Wander had a retail store at 105 Hudson St, New York, NY, and factories in Albany, NY. Hooker sold the business in 1927. Hooker built a new chloralkali plant in Tacoma, WA in 1929. Additional products, including sodium sulfide, sodium sulfhydrate, sodium tetrasulfide, and aluminum chloride were produced by the company.

=== World War II and the post-war period ===
In World War II, Hooker was a leading supplier of dodecyl mercaptan for the synthesis of rubber. The company also produced arsenic trichloride, thionyl chloride, and hexachlorobenzene. Hooker expanded into plastics manufacturing, developing epoxy vinyl ester resins, and in 1955 acquired the Durez Corporation, a manufacturer of thermoset plastic phenolic resins founded in 1948.

=== Sale to Occidental Petroleum ===
Occidental Petroleum purchased Hooker Chemical Company in 1968. Subsequent owners have renamed the company several times.

=== Documentaries ===
In 2002, filmmaker David J. Ruck told the story of the Hooker Chemical Company and its environmental negligence in Montague, Michigan, in the documentary film, This is Not a Chocolate Factory.

The films, The Killing Ground and A Fierce Green Fire, also explore the history of several of Hooker Chemical's dumping sites and the Love Canal tragedy. Hundreds of deaths have been blamed on the company’s environmental negligence.

The PBS program American Experience broadcast Poisoned Ground: The Tragedy at Love Canal on April 22, 2024, which was produced by Madrona Productions for GBH.
