= Pfohl Brothers Landfill =

- Superfund site
- Location within New York
- Location: Cheektowaga, Erie County, New York; 42°56′37″N 78°42′17″W

Information
- CERCLIS ID: NYD980507495
- Contaminants: Base Neutral Acids, Dioxins/Dibenzofurans, Metals, PAH, PCBs, Persistent Organic Pollutants, Pesticides, VOC

Progress
- Proposed: May 10, 1993
- Listed: December 16, 1994
- Construction completed: April 11, 2001
- Deleted: September 22, 2008

The 120-acre (0.49 km^{2}) Pfohl Brothers Landfill was a privately owned and operated landfill in Cheektowaga, New York. The landfill accepted municipal and industrial wastes from 1932 until 1971. It is located 1/2 mile east of the Buffalo Niagara International Airport and sits on the north bank of Ellicott Creek. It lies west of Transit Road and south of the New York State Thruway near Thruway Exit 49. It is bisected by Aero Drive.

When the landfill was active, it received solid and liquid chemical waste and sludges, including heavy metals, such as mercury and barium, and volatile organic compounds (VOCs), such as benzene and dioxins, from local businesses, such as paint manufacturers, electroplaters, printers, and other industries that used solvents and petroleum.

On May 10, 1993, the Pfohl Brothers Landfill was classified for cleanup by the United States Environmental Protection Agency as Superfund site NYD980507495. Remediation done by the New York State Department of Environmental Conservation including the removal of 4,734 on-site drums, as well as the containment of the landfill, has significantly reduced the potential for exposure to contaminated materials at the site.

Access to most of the site is restricted by a fence, but drainage ditches with runoff from the landfill lie outside of the fenced area and are accessible to the public. Several drainage ditches discharge into Ellicott Creek. Aero Lake lies north of the site. Both the lake and the creek are used by the community for recreational fishing. Ten homes are located within 200 feet (61 m) of an area of contaminated soil. The area near the landfill is residential and commercial. Wetlands border the creek and a drainage ditch and a wetland was located on what is now the central portion of the property.

== See also ==
- Landfill in the United States
- List of Superfund sites in New York
