= Kin-Buc Landfill =

Coordinates: 40.48571°N 74.38015°W

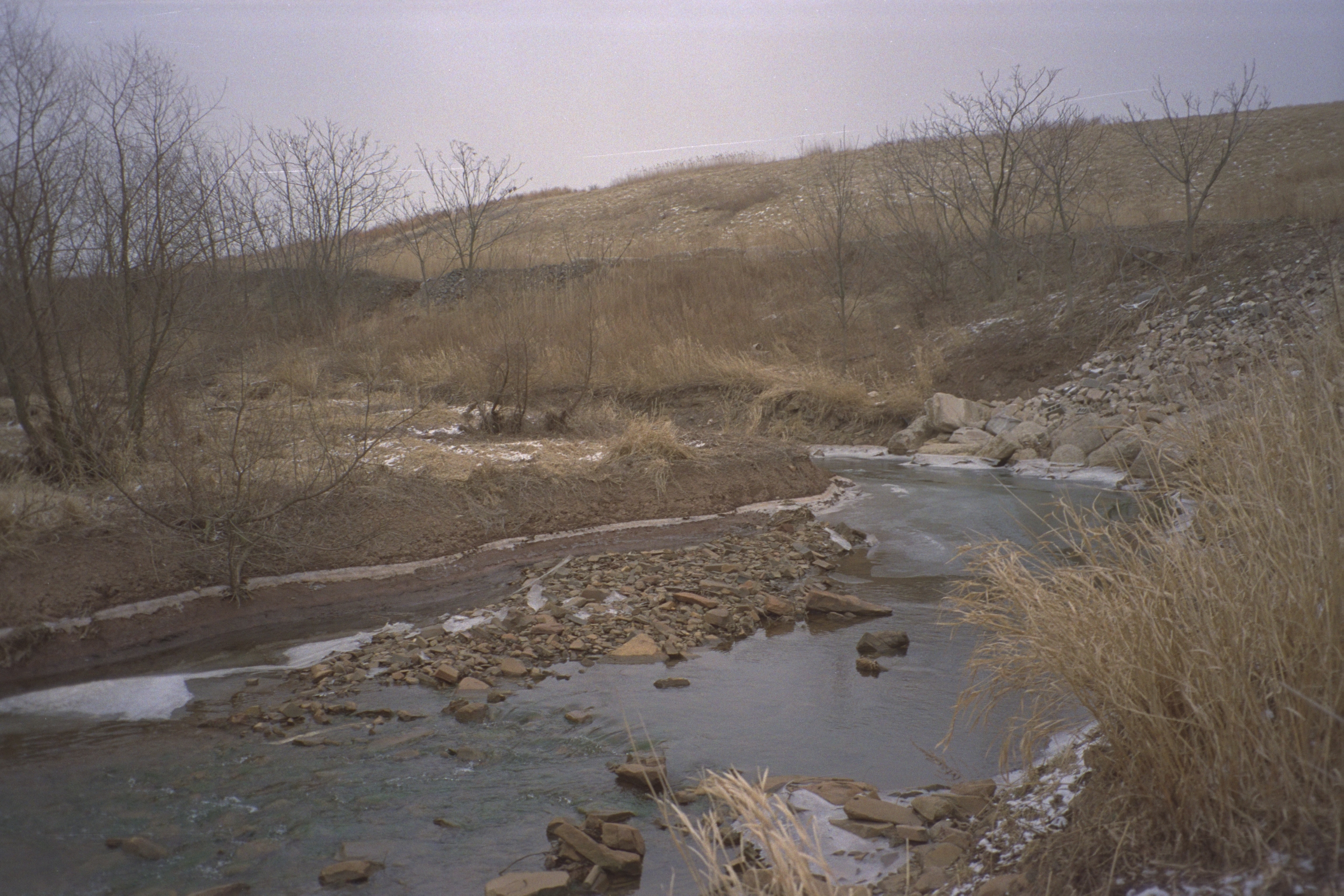
Polluted Martin's Creek on the Kin Buc Landfill site in Edison, New Jersey

The Kin-Buc Landfill is a 220-acre (0.89 km^{2}) Superfund site located in Edison, New Jersey where 70 million US gallons (260,000 m^{3}) of liquid toxic waste and 1 million tons of solid waste were dumped. It was active from the late 1940s to 1976. It was ordered closed in 1977. Cleanup operations have been underway to address environmental issues with contamination from 1980s through to 2000s. This site was one of the largest superfund sites in New Jersey having taken in around 90 million US gallons (340,000 m^{3}). The site is heavily contaminated with PCBs, which leaked into Edmonds Creek, a tributary of the Raritan River.

== History ==
From around 1947 the site was used for dumping of municipal, industrial and hazardous waste.

From 1971 to 1976 the site was state approved for liquid and solid wastes but the state approval was revoked in 1976 due to violations of state and federal environmental laws. Large quantities of PCBs were dumped without proper containment, and PCBs consequently leaked into Edmonds Creek, a tributary of the Raritan River. By 1979 legal action had been launched and in 1980 as part of the settlement between Kin-Buc Ltd. and the United States Environmental Protection Agency (USEPA) began clean-up operations with large amounts of waste shipped off site and incinerated between 1984 and 1994. There have been several phases of clean-up undertaken and later reviews of progress (1999–2000 and 2004).

In 2005 a legal agreement was reached in which US$2.6 million to pay for some of the ongoing cleanup as well as other actions to help clean up the pollution at the site.

== See also ==
- Landfill in the United States
