= Clinton Paul Townsend =

American chemist (1868–1931)

- Born: July 31, 1868; Fulton, New York, U.S.
- Died: August 3, 1931 (aged 63)

Clinton Paul Townsend (July 31, 1868 – August 3, 1931) was chemist known for the development of the Townsend cell for the chloralkali process.
