= Lois Gibbs =

American activist (born 1951)

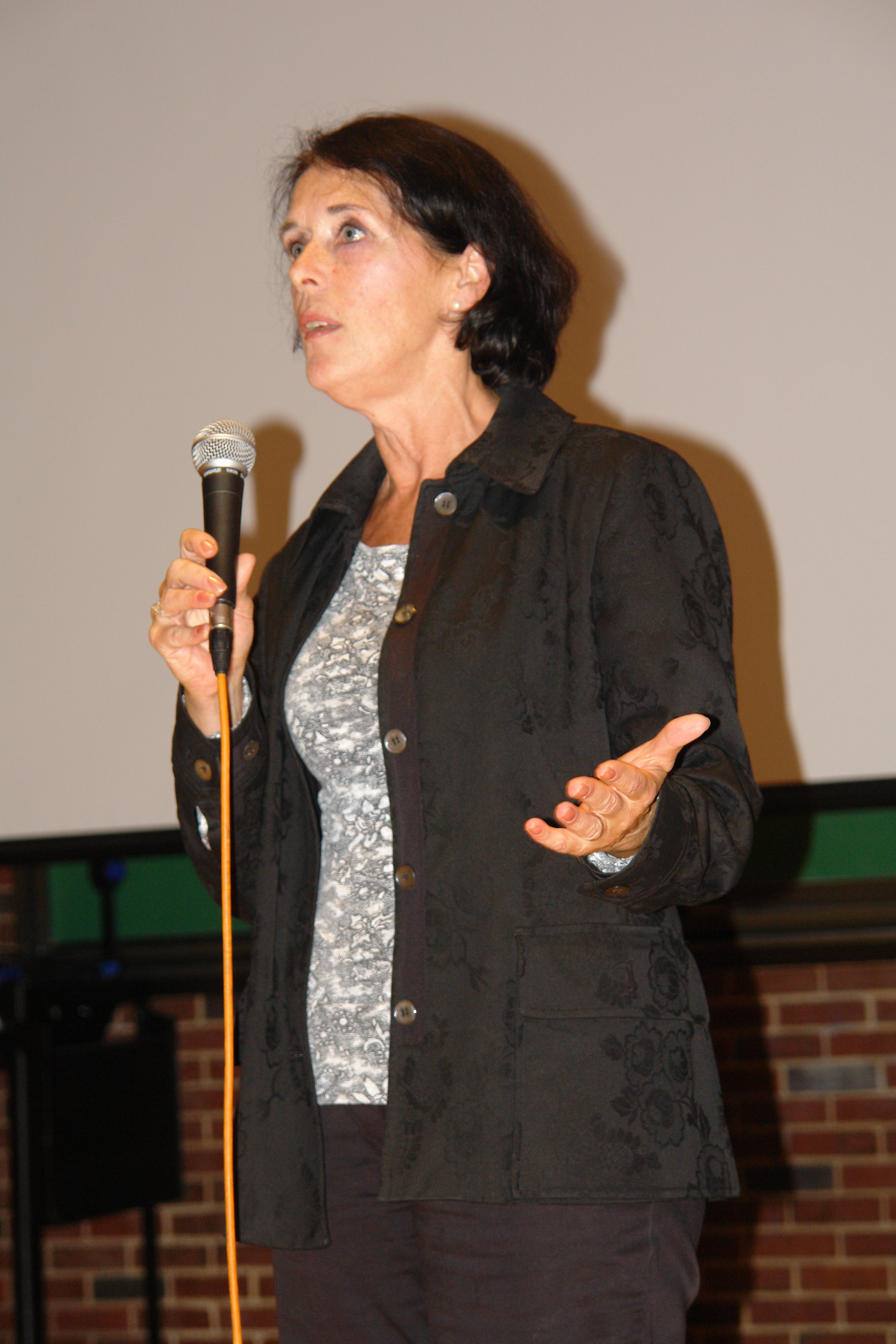
- Lois Gibbs speaks to environmental groups who oppose sulfide mining near Lake Superior north of Marquette, Michigan
- Born: June 25, 1951 (age 75); Grand Island, New York
- Occupation: environmental activist
- Years active: 1978–present
- Notable work: Dying from Dioxin (1995); Love Canal The Story Continues (1998)
- Children: 4, including Michael Gibbs
- Relatives: Harry Gibbs (first husband)
- Awards: Goldman Environmental Prize, The Heinz Awards in the Environment (1999)

Lois Marie Gibbs (born June 25, 1951) is an American environmental activist. As a primary organizer of the Love Canal Homeowners Association, Lois Gibbs brought wide public attention to the environmental crisis in Love Canal. Her actions resulted in the evacuation of over 800 families. She founded the non-profit Clearinghouse for Hazardous Waste in 1981 to help train and support local activists with their environmental work. She continues to work with the organization, renamed the Center for Health, Environment, and Justice (CHEJ).

== Early life ==
Lois Marie Gibbs was born in a blue-collar area of Grand Island, New York. She had five siblings that she grew up with; her father worked in steel mills and her mother was a housewife. Gibbs did not have many hobbies and activities as a child. After she graduated high school, she married Harry Gibbs, a chemical worker. She had two children and moved to Love Canal.

== Activism ==
Lois Gibbs's involvement in environmental causes began in 1978, when as a 27 year old housewife she discovered that her 5-year-old son's elementary school in Niagara Falls, New York, was built on a toxic waste dump. Because her two children had been healthy when they moved to their Love Canal home, but then suffered unusual health issues, she began to wonder if there was a connection. She approached the School Board after worrying about the safety of her child who attended the 93rd Street School, and they refused to take any action. Gibbs began speaking with other parents and in 1978, she started the Love Canal Parents Movement. After the creation of this movement, the New York State Department of Health stated that the school should be closed and that pregnant women and children living on these residences should leave. The state then purchased homes close to the canal, which led to the Love Canal Homeowners Association (LCHA).

Gibbs created a petition and reached out to the residents of her neighborhood by going door-to-door to gather support. Gibbs's efforts were centered on her role as a mother fighting to protect her children's health. She led her community in a battle against the local, state, and federal governments by presenting the signatures to the New York State Department of Health.

When Gibbs began organizing in Love Canal, and later continued her activism nationally, many doubted her ability to be effective. Her mother told her, "you're forgetting you're just a housewife with a high school education."

After years of struggle, 833 families were eventually evacuated, and the cleanup of Love Canal began. National press coverage made Lois Gibbs a household name. In addition, President Jimmy Carter mentioned Gibbs as the key grassroots leader in the Love Canal movement during 1980. Her efforts also led to the creation of the U.S. Environmental Protection Agency's Comprehensive Environmental Response, Compensation and Liability Act, or Superfund, which is used to locate and clean up toxic waste sites throughout the United States.

Gibbs's first husband was Harry Gibbs, a chemical operator and chemical worker. Gibbs described him as "incredibly supportive" of her activism at Love Canal. However, once the families were evacuated from Love Canal, he wanted her to "come back home and be a full-time homemaker again." Gibbs explained, "I just couldn't do that." In 1981, as a single mother of two children, she left Niagara Falls with $10,000 and relocated to the Washington, D.C., area. She did so without her family and bought a house in Virginia. As a family-oriented person, that was very difficult for her.

In 1980, Gibbs had formed the Citizens' Clearinghouse for Hazardous Waste (CCHW). Once she was living in the Washington, D.C., area, she renamed it the Center for Health, Environment and Justice (CHEJ). It was a national organization to help families who lived in environmentally degraded sites like Love Canal. It has assisted over 10,000 grassroots groups across the country with organizing, technical and general information. Gibbs currently serves as executive director. CHEJ is a grassroots environmental crisis center that provides information, resources, technical assistance and training to community groups around the nation. CHEJ seeks to form strong local organizations in order to protect neighborhoods from exposure to hazardous wastes.

== Later life ==
After leaving Niagara Falls in 1981, Gibbs has lived in Virginia. She remarried and had two more children.

Gibbs has authored several books about the Love Canal story and the effects of toxic waste. The earlier and most quoted is Love Canal. My story, written with Murray Levine and published in 1982.

Her story was dramatized in the 1982 made-for-TV movie Lois Gibbs: the Love Canal Story, in which she was played by Marsha Mason.

== Awards ==
- Received the 1990 Goldman Environmental Prize
- The 5th Annual Heinz Award in the Environment (1998)
- John Gardner Leadership Award from Independent Sector (1999)
- Nominated for a Nobel Peace Prize in 2003
- Awarded an honorary degree from Haverford College for her work as an environmental activist (2006)
- Received an honorary degree, a doctor of humane letters, from Green Mountain College (2009)
- Received an honorary degree, a doctor of Laws from Medaille College (2010)
- Received an honorary degree, a doctor of Public Service, from Tufts University (2013)

== Gallery ==
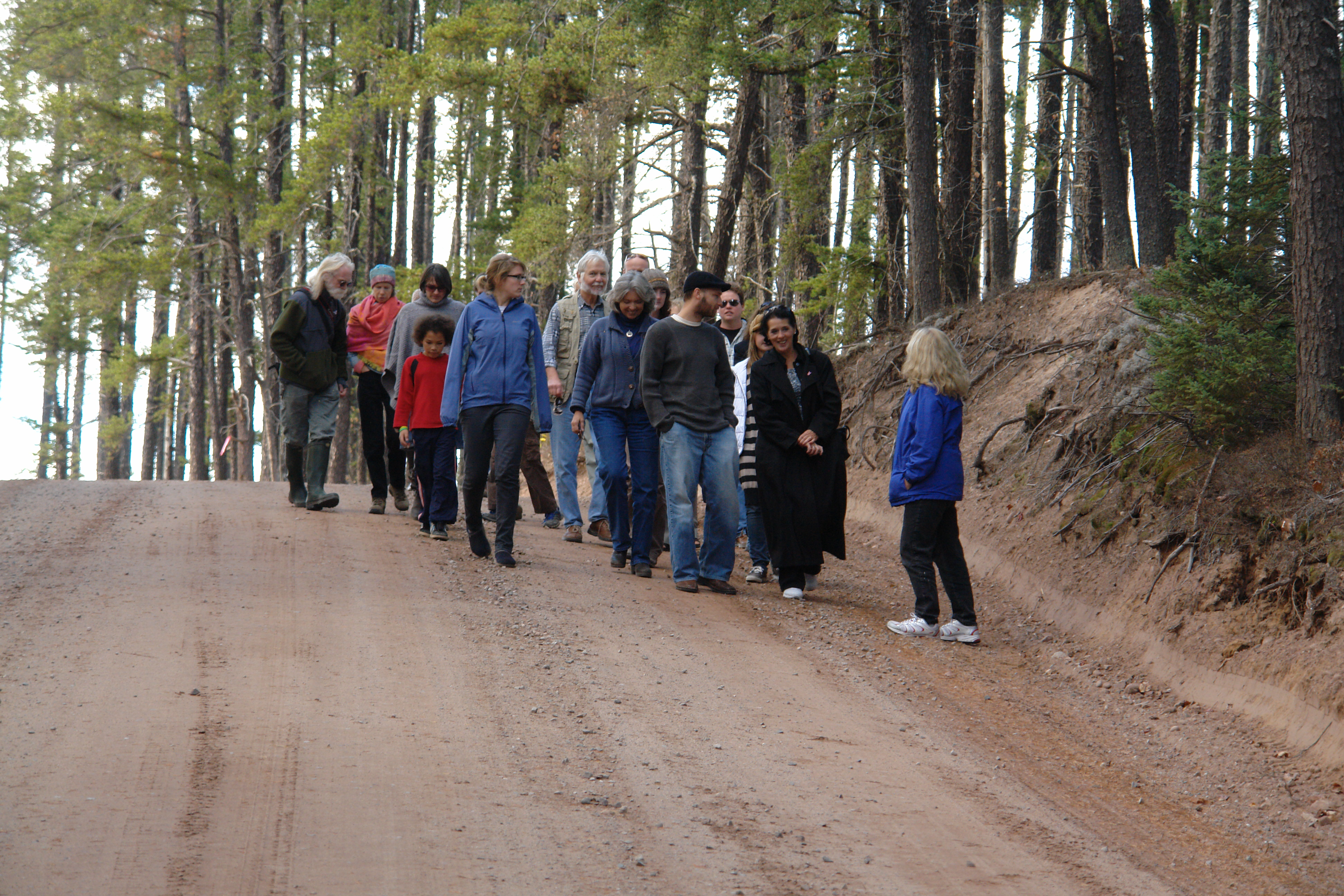
"Mother of the Superfund" Lois Gibbs leads sulfide mining opponents on a march to the entrance of the Kennecott Eagle Minerals mine near Lake Superior and Big Bay, MI

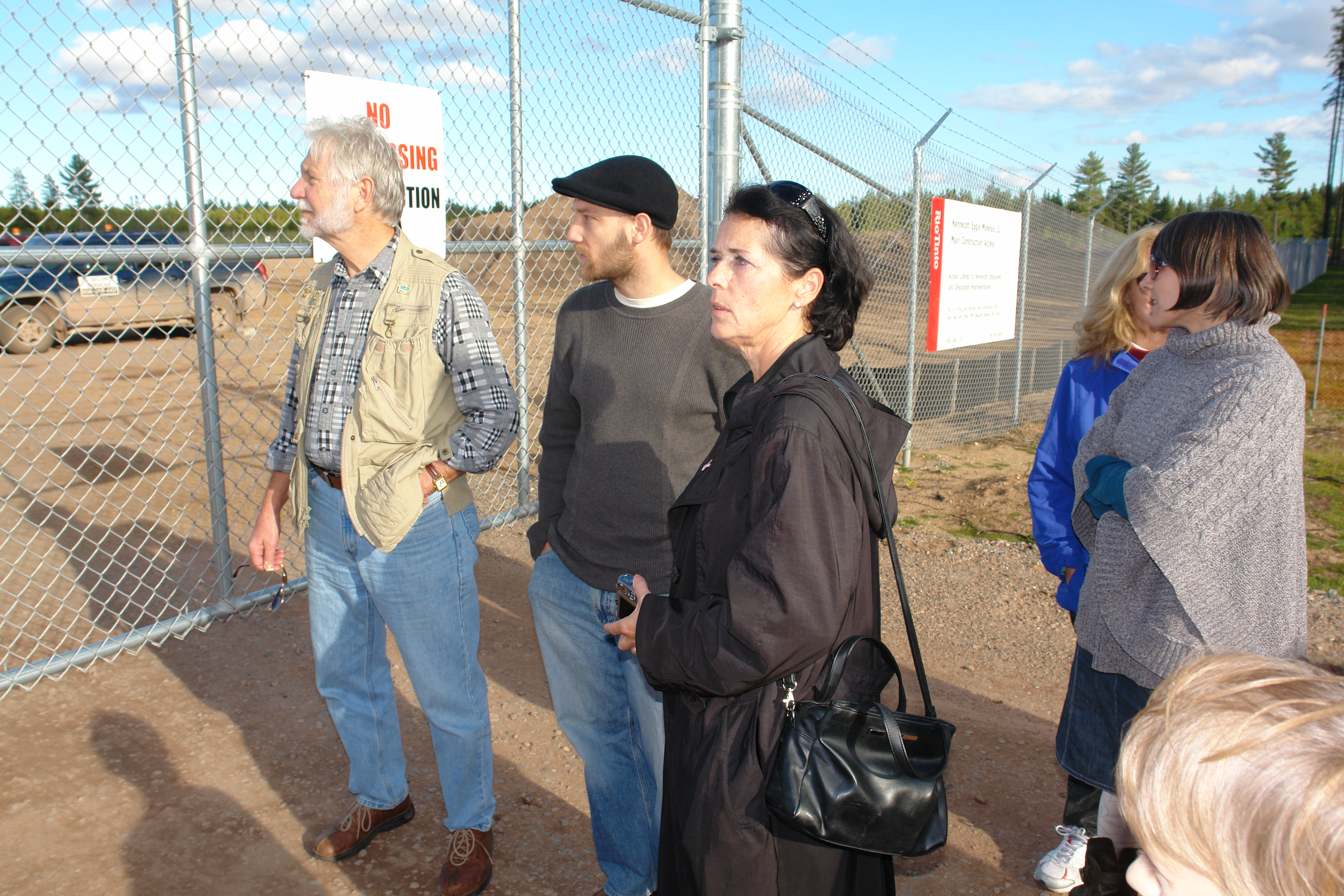
Lois Gibbs stands at the entrance of the Kennecott Minerals sulfide mine under construction near Lake Superior and Big Bay, MI

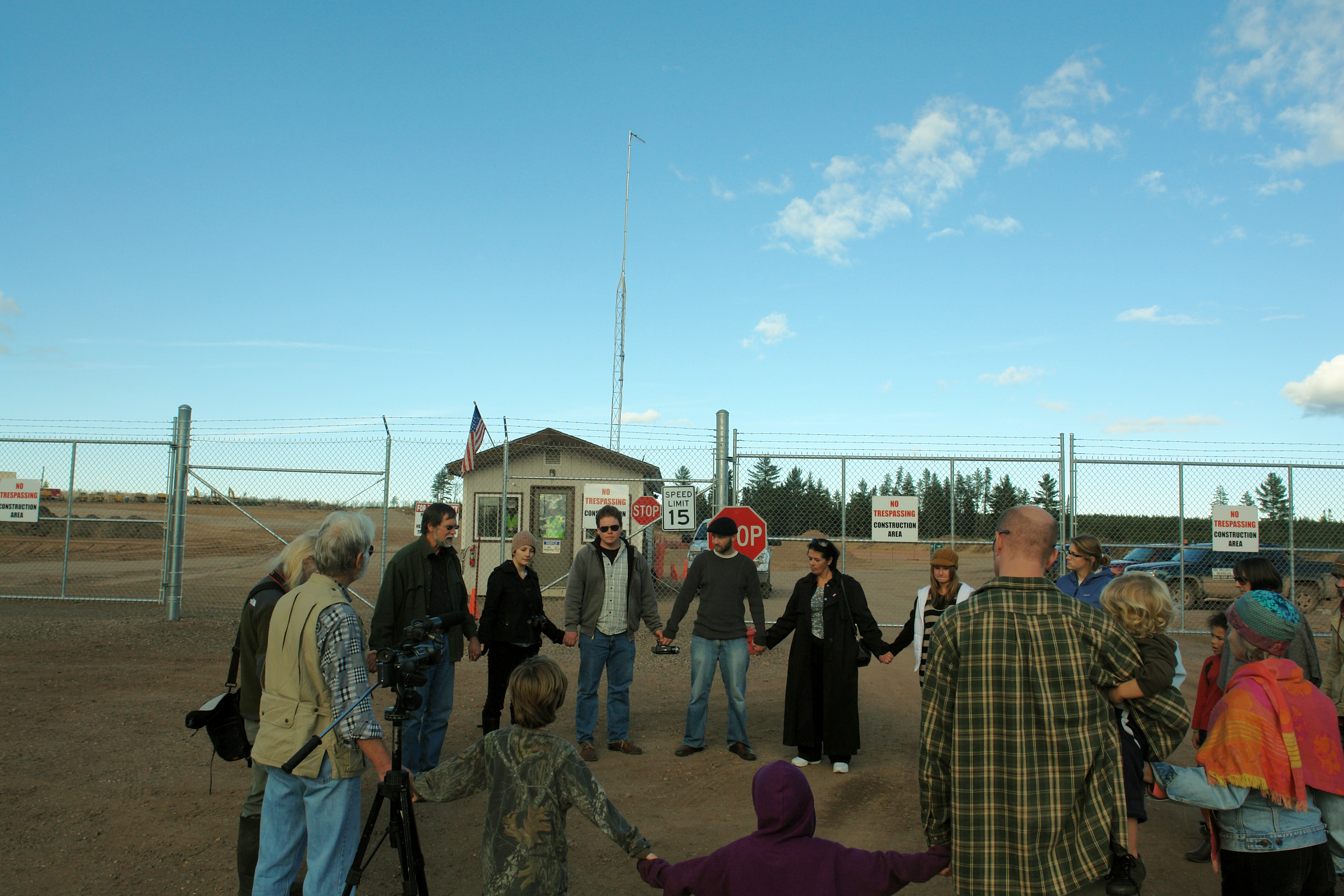
Lois Gibbs joins a circle of mine opponents to sing, pray and strategize at the entrance to the Kennecott Minerals sulfide mine that is being built near Lake Superior close to Big Bay, MI

== Library resources ==
- Lois Gibbs Love Canal Papers, 1951-2010 Tufts University
