= Love Canal =

Neighborhood in Niagara Falls, New York

- Superfund site
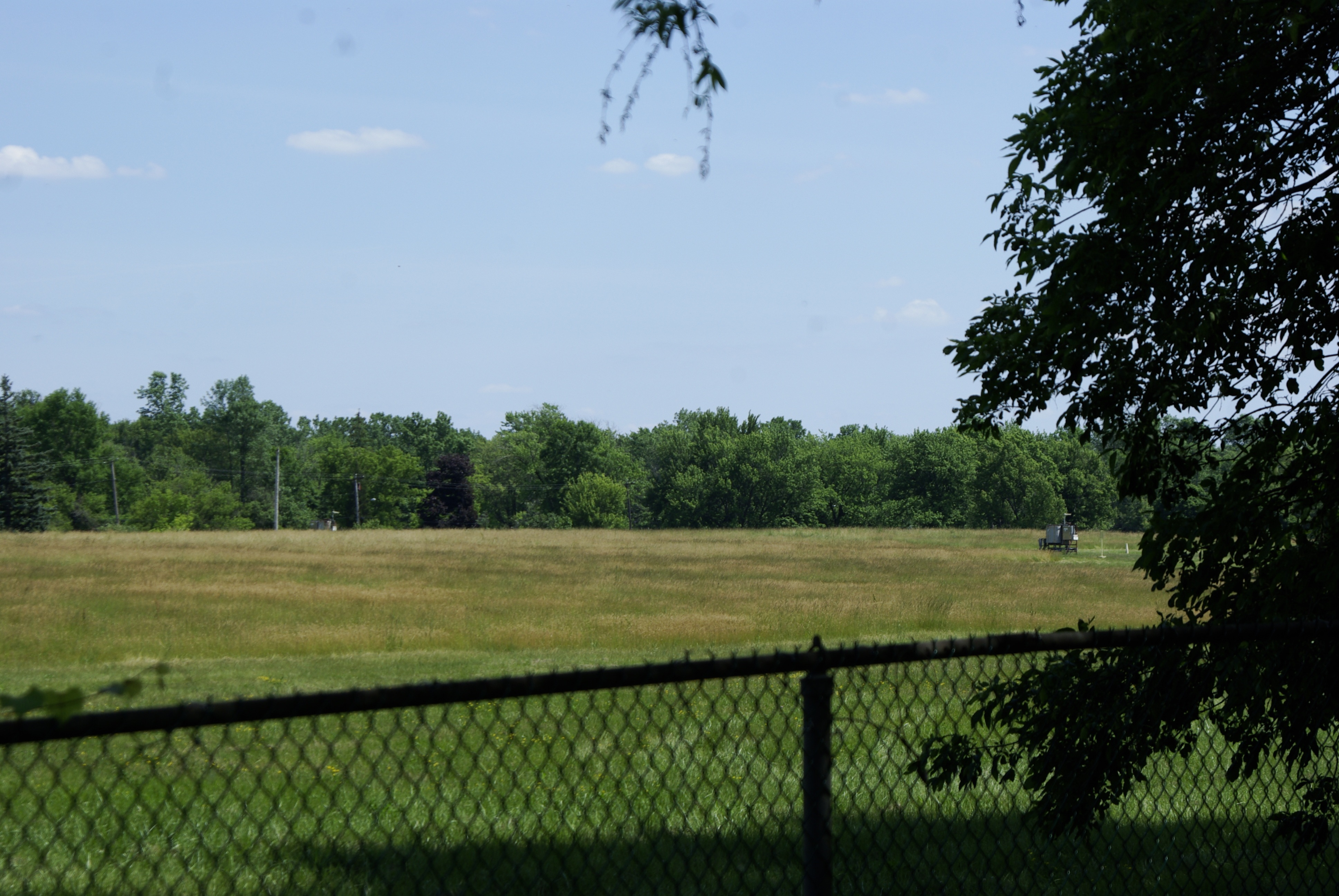
- Love Canal in 2012

- Location within New York
- Location: Niagara Falls, Niagara County, New York; 43°04′50″N 78°56′56″W

Information
- CERCLIS ID: NYD000606947
- Contaminants: Various chemicals
- Responsible parties: Hooker Chemical Company

Progress
- Proposed: December 30, 1983
- Listed: September 8, 1984
- Construction completed: September 29, 1998
- Deleted: September 30, 2004

Love Canal was a neighborhood in Niagara Falls, New York, United States, infamous as the location of a 0.28 km^{2} (0.11 sq mi) landfill that became the site of an environmental disaster discovered in 1977. Decades of exposure to dumped toxic chemicals harmed the health of hundreds, often profoundly. The area was cleaned up over a period of twenty-one years in a Superfund operation.

Love Canal's history began in the 1890s. William Love, a local real estate entrepreneur, conducted a large-scale dig project to obtain hydroelectricity to power a city he planned to build along the canal. Work halted in 1906 after alternating current (AC) electricity supply systems and conservationist concerns made the project impractical. The abandoned dig project left a one mile (1.6 km) long, about 40 ft (12 m) deep trench. In the 1920s, the canal became a dump site for municipal refuse for the city of Niagara Falls. During the 1940s, the canal was purchased by Hooker Chemical Company, which used the site to dump 19,800 metric tonnes of chemical byproducts from the manufacturing of dyes, perfumes, and solvents for rubber and synthetic resins. Hooker Chemical later sold the land to the local school district in 1953 for $1.

Over the next three decades, Love Canal attracted national attention for the public health problems originating from the former dumping of toxic waste on the grounds. This event displaced numerous families, leaving them with longstanding health issues and symptoms of high white blood cell counts and leukemia. Subsequently, the federal government passed the Superfund law in 1980. The resulting Superfund cleanup operation demolished the neighborhood, ending in 2004.

In 1988, New York State Department of Health Commissioner David Axelrod called the Love Canal incident a "national symbol of a failure to exercise a sense of concern for future generations". The Love Canal incident was especially significant as a situation where the inhabitants "'overflowed' into the wastes instead of the other way around".

== Geography ==
Love Canal was a neighborhood located in the city of Niagara Falls in the western region of the state of New York. The neighborhood covers 36 blocks in the far southeastern corner of the city, stretching from 93rd Street comprising the western border to 100th Street in the east border and 103rd Street in the northeast. Bergholtz Creek defines the northern border with the Niagara River marking the southern border one-quarter mile (400 m) away. The LaSalle Expressway splits an uninhabited portion of the south from the north. The canal covers 16 acres (6.5 ha) of land in the central eastern portion.

== Early history, canal dig, 1894–1940 ==
In 1890, William T. Love, a former railroad lawyer, prepared plans to construct a preplanned urban community of parks and residences on the shore of Lake Ontario. Love, who would become notorious for similar real-estate schemes later in life, claimed it would serve the area's burgeoning industries with much-needed hydroelectricity. He named the project Model City, New York.

After 1892, Love's plan incorporated a shipping lane that would bypass the Niagara River and its Niagara Falls, in direct competition with the existing Welland Canal to the west of the Niagara River; the canal would add a new water transportation route between Lake Erie and Lake Ontario. He arranged backing from banks in New York City, Chicago, and England. During October 1893, the first factory opened for business. In May 1894, work on the canal began. Steel companies and other manufacturers expressed interest in opening plants along Love Canal. Love began having a canal dug and built a few streets and houses.

The Panic of 1893 caused investors to end sponsorship of the project. Then in 1906, environmental groups successfully lobbied Congress to pass a law, designed to preserve Niagara Falls, prohibiting the removal of water from the Niagara River. Only one mile (1.6 km) of the canal was dug, about 50 feet (15 m) wide and 10–40 feet (3–12 m) deep, stretching northward from the Niagara River.

The Panic of 1907 combined with the development of the transmission of electrical power over great distances, creating access to hydroelectric power far from water sources, proved disastrous for what remained of the Model City plan. The last piece of property owned by Love's corporation was lost to foreclosure and sold at public auction in 1910. By that point, Love himself was long gone; in 1897 he left the United States for England, before returning to attempt similar schemes in Washington, Illinois, and Delaware.

With the project abandoned, the canal gradually filled with water. Local children swam there during summers and skated during the winters. In the 1920s, the city of Niagara Falls used the canal as a municipal landfill.

Industry and tourism increased steadily throughout the first half of the 20th century due to a great demand for industrial products and the increased mobility of people to travel. Paper, rubber, plastics, petrochemicals, carbon insulators, and abrasives comprised the city's major industries.

At the time of the dump's closure in 1952, Niagara Falls was experiencing prosperity, and the population had been expanding dramatically, growing by 31% in twenty years (1940–1960) from 78,020 to 102,394.

== Hooker Chemical Company, 1940s–1952 ==
By the end of the 1940s, Hooker Chemical Company was searching for a place to dispose its large quantity of chemical waste. The Niagara Power and Development Company granted Hooker permission during 1942 to dump wastes into the canal. The canal was drained and lined with thick clay. Into this site, Hooker began placing 55-US-gallon (210 L) drums. In 1947, Hooker bought the canal and the 70-foot-wide (21 m) banks on either side of the canal. It subsequently converted it into a 16-acre (6.5 ha) landfill.

In 1948, the City of Niagara Falls ended self-sufficient disposal of refuse and Hooker Chemical became the sole user and owner of the site.

In early 1952, when it became apparent that the site would likely be developed for construction, Hooker ceased use of Love Canal as a dumpsite. During its 10-year lifespan, the landfill served as the dumping site of 21,800 short tons (19,800 t) of chemicals, mostly composed of products such as "caustics, alkalines, fatty acid and chlorinated hydrocarbons resulting from the manufacturing of dyes, perfumes, and solvents for rubber and synthetic resins". These chemicals were buried at a depth of twenty to twenty-five feet (6 to 7.5 m). Upon its closure, the canal was covered with a clay seal to prevent leakage. Over time, vegetation settled and began to grow atop the dump site.

By the 1950s, the city of Niagara Falls was experiencing a population increase. With a growing population, the Niagara Falls City School District needed land to build new schools and attempted to purchase the property from Hooker Chemical. The population reached more than 98,000 by the 1950 census.

== Sale of the site, 1952 ==
During March 1951, the school board prepared a plan showing a school being built over the canal and listing condemnation values for each property that would need to be acquired. During March 1952, the superintendent of Niagara Falls School Board inquired of Hooker with regard to purchasing the Love Canal property for the purpose of constructing a new school. After this, in an internal company memorandum dated March 27, 1952, Bjarne Klaussen, Hooker's vice president, wrote to the works manager that "it may be advisable to discontinue using the Love Canal property for a dumping ground." During April 1952, after discussing the sale of the land with Ansley Wilcox II, Hooker's in-house legal counsel, Klaussen then wrote to the company president, R.L. Murray, suggesting that the sale could alleviate them from future liabilities for the buried chemicals:

The more we thought about it, the more interested Wilcox and I became in the proposition, and finally came to the conclusion that the Love Canal property is rapidly becoming a liability because of housing projects in the near vicinity of our property. A school, however, could be built in the center unfilled section (with chemicals underground). We became convinced that it would be a wise move to turn this property over to the schools provided we could not be held responsible for future claims or damages resulting from underground storage of chemicals.

While the school board condemned some nearby properties, Hooker agreed to sell its property to the school board for $1. Hooker's letter to the board agreeing to enter into negotiations noted that "in view of the nature of the property and the purposes for which it has been used, it will be necessary for us to have special provisions incorporated into the deed with respect to the use of the property and other pertinent matters." The board rejected the company's proposal that the deed require the land to be used for park purposes only, with the school itself to be built nearby.

As "a means of avoiding liability by relinquishing control of the site", Hooker deeded the site to the school board in 1953 for $1 with a liability limitation clause. The sale document signed on April 28, 1953, included a seventeen-line caveat purporting to release the company from all legal obligations should lawsuits occur in the future.

Prior to the delivery of this instrument of conveyance, the grantee herein has been advised by the grantor that the premises above described have been filled, in whole or in part, to the present grade level thereof with waste products resulting from the manufacturing of chemicals by the grantor at its plant in the City of Niagara Falls, New York, and the grantee assumes all risk and liability incident to the use thereof. It is therefore understood and agreed that, as a part of the consideration for this conveyance and as a condition thereof, no claim, suit, action or demand of any nature whatsoever shall ever be made by the grantee, its successors or assigns, against the grantor, its successors or assigns, for injury to a person or persons, including death resulting therefrom, or loss of or damage to property caused by, in connection with or by reason of the presence of said industrial wastes. It is further agreed as a condition hereof that each subsequent conveyance of the aforesaid lands shall be made subject to the foregoing provisions and conditions.

Critics of Hooker's actions believe that, in the words of Craig E. Colton and Peter N. Skinner, "Hooker assigned the board with a continuing duty to protect property buyers from chemicals when the company itself accepted no such 'moral obligation'." The transfer effectively ended what provision of security and maintenance for the hazardous waste had existed before and placed all responsibility in clearly unqualified hands. It was this attempt to evade their responsibility, Colten and Skinner contend, that would "ultimately come back to haunt not only Hooker but all other chemical producers in the United States through the strict liability provisions of Superfund legislation." However, Eric Zuesse writes that Hooker's decision to sell the property rather than allowing the school board to condemn it stemmed from a desire to document its warnings. "Had the land been condemned and seized," says Hooker, "the company would have been unable to air its concerns to all future owners of the property. It is difficult to see any other reason for what it did."

Not long after having taken control of the land, the Niagara Falls School Board proceeded to develop the land, including construction activity that substantially breached containment structures in a number of ways, allowing previously trapped chemicals to seep out.

The resulting breaches combined with particularly heavy rainstorms released and spread the chemical waste, resulting in a public health emergency and an urban planning scandal. In what became a test case for liability clauses, Hooker Chemical was deemed to be "careless" but not willful in the dumping of their waste. But when they sold the property they were not being willful. It was brought to light by the local paper the Niagara Falls Gazette between 1976 and when they evacuated in 1978.

== Construction of the 93rd Street School and the 99th Street School, 1952–1955 ==
Hooker Electrochemical Quit Claim Deed to Board of Education.

Despite the disclaimer, the School Board began construction of the 99th Street School in its originally intended location. In January 1954, the school's architect wrote to the education committee informing them that during excavation, workers discovered two dump sites filled with 55-US-gallon (210 L; 46 imp gal) drums containing chemical wastes. The architect also noted it would be "poor policy" to build in that area since it was not known what wastes were present in the ground, and the concrete foundation might be damaged. The school board then relocated the school site eighty to eighty-five feet (24 to 26 m) further north. The kindergarten playground also had to be relocated because it was directly on top of a chemical dump.

Upon completion in 1955, 400 children attended the school, and it opened along with several other schools that had been built to accommodate students. That same year, a twenty-five-foot (7.6 m) area crumbled exposing toxic chemical drums, which then filled with water during rainstorms. This created large puddles that children enjoyed playing in. In 1955, a second school, the 93rd Street School, was opened six blocks away.

== Home construction, 1950s ==
The school district sold the remaining land sometime in late 1957 or early 1958, resulting in homes being constructed by private developers, as well as the Niagara Falls Housing Authority. The sale came despite the warning of a Hooker attorney, Arthur Chambers, that, as paraphrased in the minutes of a board meeting, due to chemical waste having been dumped in that area, the land was not suitable for construction where underground facilities would be necessary. He stated that his company could not prevent the Board from selling the land or from doing anything they wanted to with it, but it was their intent that this property be used for a school and for parking. He further stated that Hooker felt the property should not be divided for the purpose of building homes and hoped that no one will be injured.

During 1957, the City of Niagara Falls constructed sewers for a mixture of low-income and single family residences to be built on lands adjacent to the landfill site. While building the gravel sewer beds, construction crews broke through the clay seal, breaching the canal walls. Specifically, the local government removed part of the protective clay cap to use as fill dirt for the nearby 93rd Street School, and punched holes in the solid clay walls to build water lines and the LaSalle Expressway. This allowed the toxic wastes to escape when rainwater, no longer kept out by the partially removed clay cap, washed them through the gaps in the walls. Hence, the buried chemicals could migrate and seep from the canal.

The land where the homes were being built was not part of the agreement between the school board and Hooker; thus, none of these residents knew the canal's history. When constructing the houses, builders tore through barrels of waste to put foundations, waterlines and basements. There was no monitoring or evaluating of the chemical wastes stored under the ground. Additionally, the clay cover of the canal, which was supposed to be impermeable, began to crack. The subsequent construction of the LaSalle Expressway restricted groundwater from flowing to the Niagara River. After the exceptionally wet winter and spring of 1962, the elevated expressway turned the breached canal into an overflowing pool. People reported having puddles of oil or colored liquid in yards or basements.

By the 1970s, the Love Canal area was an established suburb that appealed to commuters and families. It was proximate to the school and newly constructed churches, it was conveniently located just a few miles from the city center, and the expressway provided access to shopping and leisure opportunities. Census data revealed the area had a higher than median income, and the majority of its households included young children. Due to the great percentage of new construction in the area, less than 3% of housing units were unoccupied. In 1976, a report evaluating Niagara Falls ranked Love Canal the fourth-best area in "social well-being." In total, 800 private houses and 240 low-income apartments were constructed, including public housing project Griffon Manor, where residents were 60% African American and mainly renters. Before the public revelation of the environmental crisis, developers were planning to continue to expand the area with additional homes. There were 410 children in the school during 1978.

== Lead-up and discovery, 1970s ==
Leading up to the mid 1970s, complaints by residents of chemical odors had been made intermittently. Old waste drums could be seen bursting out of backyards and trees were turning black. Children would come back from schoolyards with burns on their hands. During the spring of 1977, the State Departments of Health and Environmental Conservation began an intensive air, soil, and groundwater sampling and analysis program after qualitative identification of a number of organic compounds in the basements of 11 homes adjacent to the Love Canal. Cinder blocks in home foundations showed evidence of chemical exposure, though at the time, this fact did not require the installation of a liner to prevent leaching.

It is reported that children still played on playgrounds affected by the landfill surface until spring of 1978, when New York State Health Department finally classified the area as a threat to human health and ordered access restriction to the landfill. When the state of New York stepped in to Love Canal in April 1978, 230 adults and 134 children lived in the homes with backyards directly on the canal, 410 students went to the elementary school, and 2,618 people lived in homes spread not more than four blocks from the landfill.

=== Contaminants ===
Numerous contaminants dumped in the landfill included chlorinated hydrocarbon residues, processed sludge, fly ash, and other materials, including residential municipal garbage.

Chemicals disposed of in Love Canal by Hooker Chemical Corp. (1942-1953)
Type of waste	Physical state	Total estimated quantity		Container
Type of waste	Physical state	Short tons	Metric tons	Container
Misc. acid chlorides other than benzoyl - includes acetyl, caprylyl, butyryl, nitro benzoyls	liquid and solid	400	360	drum
Thionyl chloride and misc. sulfur/chlorine compounds	liquid and solid	500	450	drum
Misc. chlorination - includes waxes, oils, naphthenes, aniline	liquid and solid	1,000	910	drum
Dodecyl (Lauryl, Lorol) mercaptans (DDM), chlorides and misc. organic sulfur compounds	liquid and solid	2,400	2,200	drum
Trichlorophenol (TCP)	liquid and solid	200	180	drum
Benzoyl chlorides and benzotrichlorides	liquid and solid	800	730	drum
Metal chlorides	solid	400	360	drum
Liquid disulfides (LDS/LDSN/BDS) and chlorotoluenes	liquid	700	640	drum
Hexachlorocyclohexane (Lindane/BHC)	solid	6,900	6,300	drum and nonmetallic containers
Chlorobenzenes	liquid and solid	2,000	1,800	drum and nonmetallic containers
Benzylchlorides - includes benzyl chloride, benzyl alcohol, benzyl thiocyanate	solid	2,400	2,200	drum
Sodium sulfide/sulfhydrates	solid	2,000	1,800	drum
Misc. 10% of above		2,000	1,800	
	TOTAL	21,800	19,800	
*Interagency Task Force on Hazardous Wastes, Draft Report on Hazardous Waste Disposal in Erie and Niagara Counties, New York, March 1979

Data showed unacceptable levels of toxic vapors associated with more than 80 compounds were emanating from the basements of numerous homes in the first ring directly adjacent to the Love Canal. Ten of the most prevalent and most toxic compounds – including benzene, a known human carcinogen – were selected for evaluation purposes and as indicators of the presence of other chemical constituents.

Laboratory analyses of soil and sediment samples from the Love Canal indicate the presence of more than 200 distinct organic chemical compounds; approximately 100 of these have been identified to date.

Numerous other chemicals seeped through the ground. Some of the chemicals and toxic materials found included benzene, chloroform, toluene, dioxin, and various kinds of PCB.

Chemicals found at the Love Canal
Chemical	Water & Leachate	Air	Soil & Sediment
Benzene	ID**	522.7 μg/m^{3} (3.021×10^{−10} oz/cu in)	<0.1–0.8 μg/kg (7.0×10^{−7}–5.60×10^{−6} gr/lb)
α-Benzene Hexachloride	3.2 μg/L (1.8×10^{−9} oz/cu in)	0.002–0.1 μg/m^{3} (1.2×10^{−15}–5.78×10^{−14} oz/cu in)	ID
β-Benzene Hexachloride	38 μg/L (0.0027 gr/imp gal)	3 μg/m^{3} (1.7×10^{−12} oz/cu in)	ID
δ-Benzene Hexachloride	6.9 μg/L (0.00048 gr/imp gal)	0.4 μg/m^{3} (2.3×10^{−13} oz/cu in)	ID
γ-Benzene Hexachloride (Lindane)	50 μg/L (0.0035 gr/imp gal)	ID	20 mg/g (8.8 gr/oz)
Carbon tetrachloride	ID	5.0 μg/m^{3} (2.9×10^{−12} oz/cu in)	
Chlorobenzene	10 mg/L (3.6×10^{−7} lb/cu in)	0.1–172 μg/m^{3} (5.8×10^{−14}–9.9422×10^{−11} oz/cu in)	0.4–2.9 μg/kg (2.8×10^{−6}–2.03×10^{−5} gr/lb)
Chloroform	0.2–3.9 μg/L (1.4×10^{−5}–0.000274 gr/imp gal)	0.5–24.0 μg/m^{3} (2.9×10^{−13}–1.387×10^{−11} oz/cu in)	0.2–2.3 μg/kg (1.4×10^{−6}–1.61×10^{−5} gr/lb)
Chlorotoluene	75 mg/L (2.7×10^{−6} lb/cu in)	0.008–7,650 μg/m^{3} (4.6×10^{−15}–4.4219805×10^{−9} oz/cu in)	ID
Dichlorobenzene	3 mg/L (1.1×10^{−7} lb/cu in)	<0.3–100.5 μg/m^{3} (1.7×10^{−13}–5.809×10^{−11} oz/cu in)	240 μg/kg (0.0017 gr/lb)
Dichloroethane	0.2–4.8 μg/L (1.4×10^{−5}–0.000337 gr/imp gal)		<0.4–2 μg/kg (2.8×10^{−6}–1.40×10^{−5} gr/lb)
Dichlorotoluene	95 μg/L (0.0067 gr/imp gal)	<18–74 μg/m^{3} (1.0×10^{−11}–4.3×10^{−11} oz/cu in)	
1,3-Hexachlorobutadiene (c-46)		22–114 μg/m^{3} (1.3×10^{−11}–6.6×10^{−11} oz/cu in)	
Pentachlorobenzene	2.5 mg/L (9.0×10^{−8} lb/cu in)	0.5 mg/m^{3} (0.00022 gr/cu ft)	58 μg/kg (0.00041 gr/lb)
Tetrachlorobenzene	5 mg/L (1.8×10^{−7} lb/cu in)	0.01–74 μg/m^{3} (5.8×10^{−15}–4.27747×10^{−11} oz/cu in)	11–100 μg/kg (7.7×10^{−5}–0.000700 gr/lb)
Tetrachloroethylene	<0.3–0.8 μg/L (2.1×10^{−5}–5.6×10^{−5} gr/imp gal)	<0.2–52 μg/m^{3} (1.2×10^{−13}–3.006×10^{−11} oz/cu in)	<0.3 μg/kg (2.1×10^{−6} gr/lb)
Tetrachlorotoluene	1 mg/L (3.6×10^{−8} lb/cu in)	<0.01–0.97 μg/m^{3} (5.8×10^{−15}–5.607×10^{−13} oz/cu in)	ID
Trichlorobenzene	52 μg/m^{3} (3.0×10^{−11} oz/cu in)	0.03–84.1 μg/m^{3} (1.7×10^{−14}–4.8613×10^{−11} oz/cu in)	34–64 μg/kg (0.00024–0.00045 gr/lb)
Trichloroethylene	52 mg/L (1.9×10^{−6} lb/cu in)	73 μg/m^{3} (4.2×10^{−11} oz/cu in)	ID
Trichlorophenol	0.1–11.3 μg/L (7.0×10^{−6}–0.0007928 gr/imp gal)	ID	0.5–90 μg/kg (3.5×10^{−6}–0.0006300 gr/lb)
Trichlorotoluene	34 mg/L (1.2×10^{−6} lb/cu in)	0.05–43.7 μg/m^{3} (2.9×10^{−14}–2.5260×10^{−11} oz/cu in)	ID
Toluene	250 mg/L (9.0×10^{−6} lb/cu in)	0.1–6.2 mg/m^{3} (5.8×10^{−11}–3.584×10^{−9} oz/cu in)	<0.1–104 micrograms per kilogram (7.0×10^{−7}–0.00072800 gr/lb)
Dioxin (TCDD)	1.4-5.1 ppt		<2 ppt-312 ppt
1,2-Dichloroethylene	0.1–0.1 μg/L (7.0×10^{−6}–7.0×10^{−6} gr/imp gal)	334 μg/m^{3} (1.93×10^{−10} oz/cu in)	
Polychlorinated biphenyl (PCB)	0.64 mg/L (2.3×10^{−8} lb/cu in)		2-6 ppm
Methylene Chloride	<0.3–0.3 μg/L (2.1×10^{−5}–2.1×10^{−5} gr/imp gal)	<0.7–11.6 μg/m^{3} (4.0×10^{−13}–6.71×10^{−12} oz/cu in)	
Bis (2-ethylhexyl) Phthalate	8.1–24 μg/L (0.00057–0.00168 gr/imp gal)		
* These analyses are a summation of work performed by the Toxicology Institute, Division of Laboratories and Research, New York State Department of Health and various laboratories of the U.S. Environmental Protection Agency and their subcontractors. ** ID – Identified but not quantified

== Health effects ==
At first, scientific studies did not conclusively prove the chemicals were responsible for the residents' illnesses, and scientists were divided on the issue, even though eleven known or suspected carcinogens had been identified, one of the most prevalent being benzene. Also present was dioxin (polychlorinated dibenzodioxins) in the water, a very hazardous substance. Dioxin pollution is usually measured in parts per trillion; at Love Canal, water samples showed dioxin levels of 53 parts per billion (53,000 parts per trillion). Geologists were recruited to determine whether underground swales were responsible for carrying the chemicals to the surrounding residential areas. Once there, chemicals could leach into basements and evaporate into household air.

In 1979, the EPA announced the result of blood tests that showed high white blood cell counts, a precursor to leukemia, and chromosome damage in Love Canal residents. 33% of the residents had undergone chromosomal damage. In a typical population, chromosomal damage affects 1% of people. Other studies were unable to find harm. In 1991, the United States National Research Council (NRC) surveyed Love Canal health studies. The NRC noted the major exposure of concern was the groundwater rather than drinking water; the groundwater "seeped into basements" and then resulted in exposure through air and soil. Several studies reported higher levels of low-birth weight babies and birth defects among the exposed residents with some evidence the effect subsided after the exposure was eliminated. The National Research Council also noted a study that found exposed children were found to have an "excess of seizures, learning problems, hyperactivity, eye irritation, skin rashes, abdominal pain, and incontinence" and stunted growth. Voles in the area were found to have significantly increased mortality compared to controls (mean life expectancy in exposed animals "23.6 and 29.2 days, respectively, compared to 48.8 days" for control animals). New York State also has an ongoing health study of Love Canal residents. In that year, the Albert Elia Building Co., Inc., now Sevenson Environmental Services, Inc., was selected as the principal contractor to safely re-bury the toxic waste at the Love Canal Site.

According to the United States Environmental Protection Agency (EPA), in 1979, residents exhibited a "disturbingly high rate of miscarriages ... Love Canal can now be added to a growing list of environmental disasters involving toxics, ranging from industrial workers stricken by nervous disorders and cancers to the discovery of toxic materials in the milk of nursing mothers." In one case, two out of four children in a single Love Canal family had birth defects; one girl was born deaf with a cleft palate, an extra row of teeth, and slight intellectual disability, and a boy was born with an eye defect.

== Activism tactics ==
Activism at Love Canal was organized by community residents, homeowners and renters alike, though not conjoined. Tom Heiser and Lois Gibbs were names known in media for standing up to Hooker Chemical. White women took the most prominent public and active roles. Residents of Griffon Manor received less media coverage and less governmental and community assistance due to racism and classism, yet organized with their own demands all the same.

In addition to community organizing and pressuring authorities for appropriate responses, direct-action forms of activism were employed. Some residents even took matters into their own hands and orchestrated community testing. Tactics included protests and rallies, which were intentionally timed and planned in an effort to maximize media attention. Such events included "controversial" methods such as mothers protesting while pushing strollers, marching by pregnant women, and children holding protest signs. Notably, two EPA employees were also held hostage by activists for approximately five hours at the office of the Love Canal Homeowners Association (LCHA), to bring their demands to the attention of the federal government.

=== Role of community organizations ===
Numerous organizations were formed in response to the crisis at Love Canal, with members' activism emphasizing different concerns. In addition to the Love Canal Homeowners Association (LCHA) which organized mainly white mothers and homeowners, other major organizations included the Ecumenical Taskforce (ETF), composed of local religious denominations and institutions, National Association for the Advancement of Colored People (NAACP), and the Concerned Love Canal Renters Association (CLCRA).

=== Women of the Love Canal Homeowners' Association ===
Members of the Love Canal Homeowners' Association were predominately women, who banded together, protesting against the department of health to get answers about unexplained health effects.

On August 2, 1978, Lois Gibbs, a local mother who called an election to head the Love Canal Homeowners' Association, began to rally homeowners. Her son, Michael Gibbs, began attending school in September 1977. He developed epilepsy in December, suffered from asthma and a urinary tract infection, and had a low white blood cell count, all associated with his exposure to the leaking chemical waste. Gibbs had learned from Brown that her neighborhood sat atop the buried chemical waste.

During the following years, Gibbs organized an effort to investigate community concerns about the health of its residents. She and other residents made repeated complaints of strange odors and "substances" that surfaced in their yards. In Gibbs' neighborhood, there was a high rate of unexplained illnesses, miscarriages, and intellectual disability. Basements were often covered with a thick, black substance, and vegetation was dying. In many yards, the only vegetation that grew were shrubby grasses. Although city officials were asked to investigate the area, they did not act to solve the problem. Niagara Falls mayor Michael O'Laughlin infamously stated that there was "nothing wrong" in Love Canal.

With further investigation, Gibbs discovered the chemical danger of the adjacent canal. This began her organization's two-year effort to demonstrate that the waste buried by Hooker Chemical was responsible for the health problems of local residents. Throughout the ordeal, homeowners' concerns were ignored not only by Hooker Chemical (now a subsidiary of Occidental Petroleum), but also by members of government. These parties argued that the area's endemic health problems were unrelated to the toxic chemicals buried in the Canal. Since the residents could not prove the chemicals on their property had come from Hooker's disposal site, they could not prove liability. Throughout the legal battle, residents were unable to sell their properties and relocate.

=== Concerned Love Canal Renter's Association ===
The Concerned Love Canal Renter's Association (CLCRA), formed September 1978, was an activist group that organized shortly after the NAACP's involvement to give a voice to the residents of Love Canal that were renters. Many of the renters of Griffon Manor, a public housing project, were Black. William Abrams Sr., former resident of Griffon Manor and 1978 President of the Niagara Falls NAACP chapter, demanded equal treatment of renters during investigation of Love Canal. Although publicly supported by leadership of the LCHA, high racial tension ran between rank and file members of the LCHA and Griffon Manor residents. Many property owners considered including renters in relocation negotiations to be too expensive and risky to ask for. There were misconceptions about the effect the contamination had on Griffon Manor residents', some alleging the contamination was absent from the housing project entirely. All Love Canal residents, renter or homeowner, navigated a public health department that wasn't working urgently enough to address the environmental disaster.

The CLCRA's main concerns surrounded adequate testing and relocation allocation for renters as well as home owners. Elene Thornton was a leader of the CLCRA and conducted her own testing events for her community and advocated for the proper financial assistance to support anyone who chose to leave. In 1980, a group named LCARA (Love Canal Area Revitalization Agency), distributed $500,000 to renters and $17.5 billion to homeowners before any decisions or settlements had been decided on to aid the renter population. Ultimately, the New York government agreed to buyout residents homes from the affected area. Most property owners as well as renters were relocated to communities and other public housing projects just a few miles away from Love Canal.

=== The Ecumenical Task Force of the Niagara Frontier ===
Local religious denominations and institutions around Niagara and the surrounding area created the Ecumenical Task Force of the Niagara Frontier (ETF) in 1979 to provide disaster relief for residents affected by the chemical waste. In operation until 1991, the form and function of the task force gradually changed from providing basic disaster relief to a social and political environmental advocacy group determined to work directly alongside local, state, and federal government institutions. Members on the board of directors of the ETF expressed their frustration towards the poor relief efforts provided by government institutions. They expressed concerns about the underlying racist views of predominantly white homeowners within the LCHA and local government officials. They provided significant support to the tenants of Griffon Manor, a low-income housing project in Niagara, who they felt were under-represented and discriminated against by others within the community.

== Aftermath ==
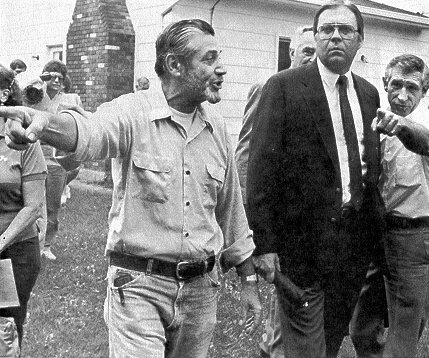
Love Canal residents discuss revitalizing their contaminated neighborhood with EPA Administrator Lee M. Thomas in 1985.

When Eckhardt C. Beck (EPA Administrator for Region 2, 1977–1979) visited Love Canal during the late 1970s, he discerned the presence of toxic substances in the community:

I visited the canal area at that time. Corroding waste-disposal drums could be seen breaking up through the grounds of backyards. Trees and gardens were turning black and dying. One entire swimming pool had been popped up from its foundation, afloat now on a small sea of chemicals. Puddles of noxious substances were pointed out to me by the residents. Some of these puddles were in their yards, some were in their basements, others yet were on the school grounds. Everywhere the air had a faint, choking smell. Children returned from play with burns on their hands and faces.

Robert Whalen, then-New York's Health Commissioner, also visited Love Canal and believed that the Canal constituted an emergency, stating: "Love Canal Chemical Waste Landfill constitutes a public nuisance and an extremely serious threat and danger to the health, safety and welfare of those using it, living near it or exposed to the conditions emanating from it, consisting among other things, of chemical wastes lying exposed on the surface in numerous places pervasive, pernicious and obnoxious chemical vapors and fumes affecting both the ambient air and the homes of certain residents living near such sites." Whalen also instructed people to avoid going into their basements as well as to avoid fruits and vegetables grown in their gardens. People became very worried because many had consumed produce from their gardens for several years. Whalen urged that all pregnant women and children under the age of two be removed from Love Canal as soon as possible.

The 99th Street School, on the other hand, was located within the former boundary of the Hooker Chemical landfill site. It was closed some two years later and subsequently demolished because of concerns about seeping toxic waste, but both the school board and the chemical company denied responsibility for the pollution, and thus the liability for its cleanup and the damages arising from past failures to remediate the site.

=== Evacuation ===
The lack of public interest in Love Canal made matters worse for the homeowners' association, which was opposed by two organizations seeking to disprove negligence in the disposal of the waste. Initially, members of the association had been frustrated by the lack of a public entity that could advise and defend them. Gibbs met with public resistance from a number of residents within the community. Eventually, the federal government relocated more than 800 families and reimbursed them for the loss of their homes. The state government and federal government used $15 million to purchase 400 homes closest to Love Canal and demolished several rings of houses.

=== Litigation and compensation ===
In 1994, Federal District Judge John Curtin ruled that Hooker/Occidental had been negligent, but not reckless, in its handling of the waste and sale of the land to the Niagara Falls School Board. Curtin's decision also contains a detailed history of events leading up to the Love Canal disaster. Occidental Petroleum was sued by the EPA and in 1995 agreed to pay $129 million in restitution. Out of that federal lawsuit came money for a small health fund and $3.5 million for the state health study. Residents' lawsuits were also settled in the years following the Love Canal disaster.

The Department of Justice published a report noting that the sites have been successfully remediated and are ready again for use. The Love Canal Area Revitalization Authority sold a few abandoned homes to private citizens. Virtually all remedial activities of the site, other than the operation of the leachate collection system, were completed by 1989.

=== Remediation ===
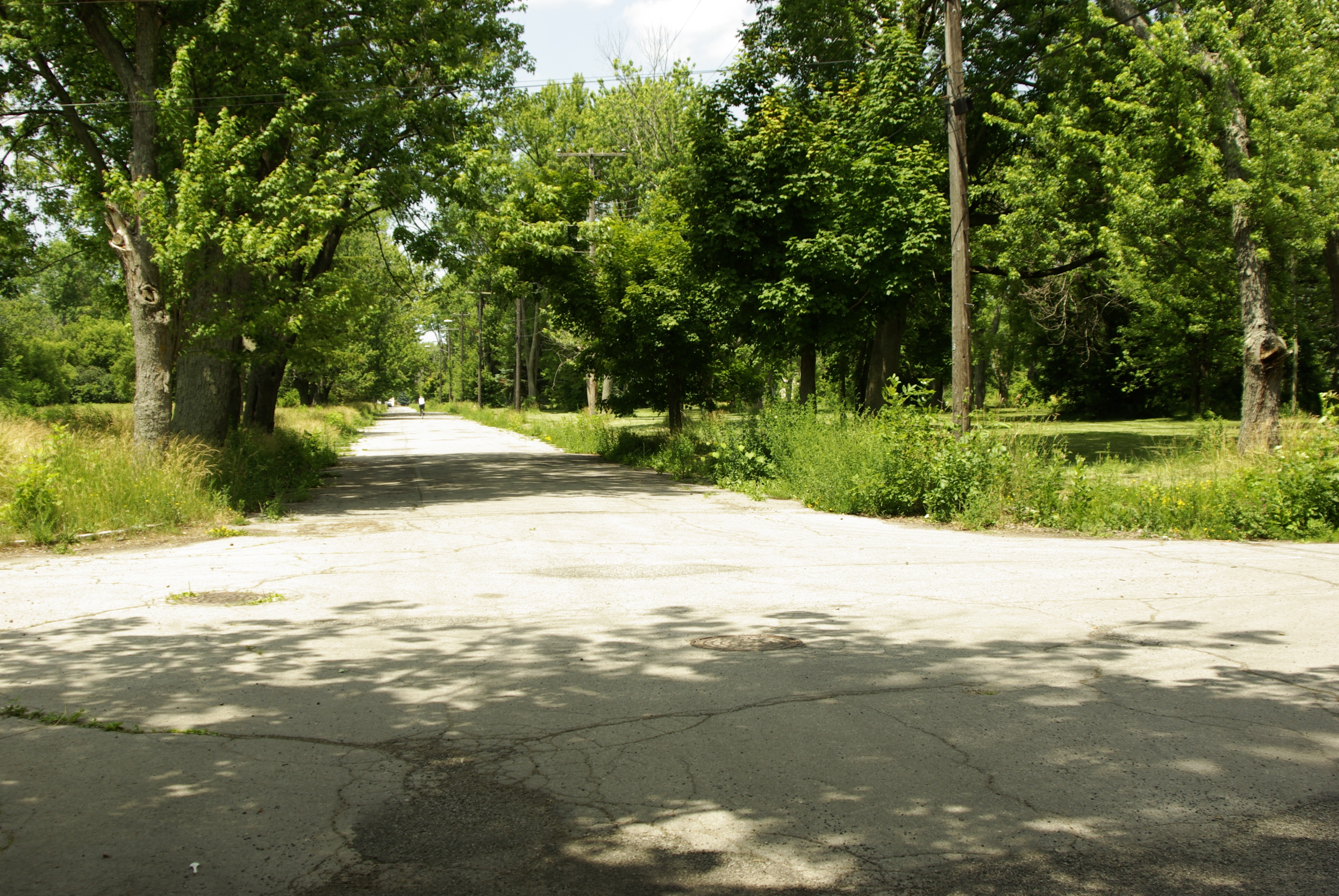
Abandoned streets on the west side of Love Canal.

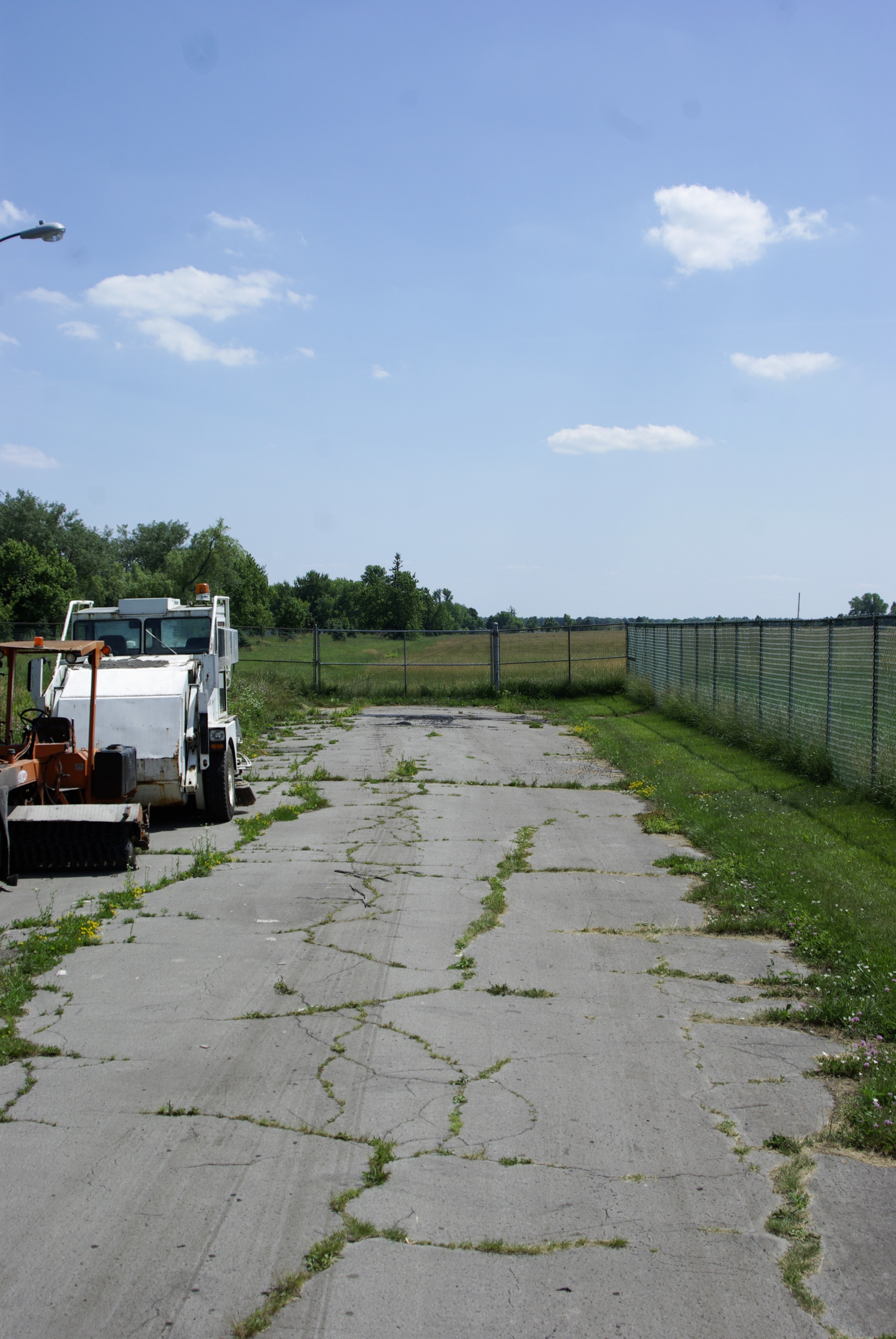
Looking down 99th Street in Love Canal.

Houses in the residential areas on the east and west sides of the canal were demolished. All that remains on the west side are abandoned residential streets. Some older east side residents, whose houses stand alone in the demolished neighborhood, chose to stay. It was estimated that fewer than 90 of the original 900 families opted to remain. They were willing to remain as long as they were guaranteed that their homes were in a relatively safe area. On June 4, 1980, the state government founded the Love Canal Area Revitalization Agency (LCARA) to restore the area. The area north of Love Canal became known as Black Creek Village. LCARA wanted to resell 300 homes that had been bought by New York when the residents were relocated. The homes are farther away from where the chemicals were dumped. The most toxic area (16 acres (6.5 ha)) was reburied with a thick plastic liner, clay and dirt. A 2.4-metre (7 ft 10 in) high barbed wire fence was installed around the area. It has been calculated that 248 separate chemicals, including 60 kilograms (130 lb) of dioxins, have been unearthed from the canal.

=== Analysis ===
In 1998, Elizabeth Whelan, founder of industry advocacy group American Council on Science and Health, wrote an editorial about the Canal in which she stated that the media started calling the Canal a "public health time bomb", an editorial that created minor hysteria. She declared that people were not falling ill because of exposure to chemical waste, but from stress caused by the media. Besides double the rate of birth defects to children born while living on Love Canal, a follow-up study two decades after the incident "showed increased risks of low birth weight, congenital malformations and other adverse reproductive events".

Love Canal, along with Times Beach, Missouri and the Valley of the Drums, Kentucky, are important in United States environmental history as three sites that significantly contributed to the passing of the CERCLA. Love Canal has "become the symbol for what happens when hazardous industrial products are not confined to the workplace but 'hit people where they live' in inestimable amounts".

Love Canal was not an isolated case. Eckardt C. Beck suggested that there are probably hundreds of similar dumpsites. President Carter declared that discovering these dumpsites was "one of the grimmest discoveries of the modern era". Had the residents of Love Canal been aware that they were residing on toxic chemicals, most would not have moved there in the first place. Beck noted that one main problem remains that ownership of such chemical companies can change over the years, making liability difficult to assign (a problem that would be addressed by CERCLA, or the Superfund Act). Beck contended that increased commitment was necessary to develop controls that would "defuse future Love Canals".

Some free market environmentalist activists have cited the Love Canal incident as a consequence of government decision-makers not taking responsibility for their decisions. Economics professor Richard Stroup writes, "The school district owning the land had a laudable but narrow goal: it wanted to provide education cheaply for district children. Government decision makers are seldom held accountable for broader social goals in the way that private owners are by liability rules and potential profits."

== Federal response, 1978–2004 ==
On August 7, 1978, United States President Jimmy Carter announced a federal health emergency, called for the allocation of federal funds, and ordered the Federal Disaster Assistance Agency to assist the City of Niagara Falls to remedy the Love Canal site. This was the first time in American history that emergency funds were used for a situation other than a natural disaster. Carter had trenches built that would transport the wastes to sewers and had home sump pumps sealed off.

Congress passed the Comprehensive Environmental Response, Compensation, and Liability Act (CERCLA), better known as the Superfund Act. Love Canal became the first entry on the list. CERCLA created a tax on the chemical and petroleum industries and provided broad Federal authority to respond directly to releases or threatened releases of hazardous substances that may endanger public health or the environment. CERCLA also created a National Priorities List, a shortened list of the sites that has priority in cleanup. Love Canal was the first Superfund site on that list. Eventually, the site was cleaned and deleted off the list in 2004. Because the Superfund Act contained a "retroactive liability" provision, Occidental was held liable for cleanup of the waste even though it had followed all applicable U.S. laws when disposing of it.

== Awareness ==
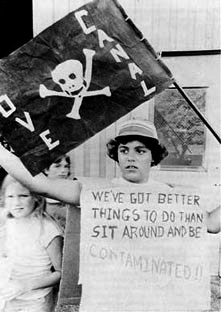
A protest by Love Canal residents, c. 1978.

In 1976, two reporters for the Niagara Falls Gazette, David Pollak and David Russell, tested several sump pumps near Love Canal and found toxic chemicals in them. The Gazette published reports, once in October 1976 and once in November 1976, of chemical analyses of residues near the old Love Canal dumpsite indicating the presence of 15 organic chemicals, including three toxic chlorinated hydrocarbons.

The matter became quiet for more than a year and was then revived by reporter Michael Brown, who then investigated potential health effects by performing an informal door-to-door survey during early 1978, writing a hundred news items on toxic wastes in the area and finding birth defects and many anomalies such as enlarged feet, heads, hands, and legs. He advised the local residents to create a protest group, which was organized by resident Karen Schroeder, whose daughter had many (about a dozen) birth defects. The New York State Health Department investigated and found an abnormal incidence of miscarriages. Brown discovered the size of the canal, the presence of dioxin, the expanding contamination, and the involvement, to an extent, of the U.S. Army. Hooker threatened to sue him and he fought the firm for years, including on the Today Show. His book on toxic wastes, Laying Waste: The Poisoning of America By Toxic Chemicals, was the first written on the subject of toxic wastes and created a national firestorm, as did articles of his in The New York Times Magazine and The Atlantic Monthly. He also discovered a huge dump called the Hyde Park landfill (or Bloody Run) and the "S-Area," which was leaking into the water supply for Niagara Falls. His work inspired many activists. He spoke for ten years on the college lecture circuit.

In September 1977, Congressman John LaFalce (D), who represented the district, paid a high profile visit to Love Canal, to raise attention to the serious problems. LaFalce intervened to get city, state and federal officials, and Hooker executives, involved to take quick action, but he was met with resistance, apathy and stalling.

By 1978, Love Canal had become a national media event with articles referring to the neighborhood as "a public health time bomb", and "one of the most appalling environmental tragedies in American history". Brown, working for the local newspaper, the Niagara Gazette, is credited with not only revealing the case, but establishing toxic chemical wastes as a nationwide issue as well. Brown's book, Laying Waste, examined the Love Canal disaster and many other toxic waste catastrophes nationwide.

The dumpsite was declared an unprecedented state of emergency on August 2, 1978. Brown, who wrote more than a hundred articles concerning the dump, tested the groundwater and later found the dump was three times larger than originally thought, with possible ramifications beyond the original evacuation zone. He also discovered that toxic dioxins were there.

=== Conclusion ===
In 2004, federal officials announced that the Superfund cleanup has ended, although cleanup had concluded years prior. The entire process occurred over 21 years and cost a total of $400 million. About 260 homes north of the canal have been renovated and sold to new owners, and about 150 acres (61 ha) east of the canal have been sold to commercial developers for light industrial uses. In total, 950 families had been evacuated. The site was removed from the Superfund list on September 30, 2004.

=== Epilogue ===
After Love Canal families were relocated, the canal was buried under a plastic liner, clay and topsoil in a fenced area that was declared to be permanently off-limits, while scores of the abandoned homes were buried. The rest of the Love Canal area was declared safe by the EPA and a public corporation (Love Canal Revitalization Agency) took ownership of the abandoned properties, which were fixed up and sold.

Beginning in 1990, there were 260 homes that were given new vinyl siding, roofs and windows, then resold at prices that were 20% below market value and renamed "Black Creek Village." By 1998, the Love Canal Revitalization Agency had sold 232 of 239 renovated homes. New residents of the area were initially undeterred and felt safe due to extensive testing of the area. They were enticed to move into the area due to the promise of "cleaned-up land and affordable homes." For example, Dan and Teresa Reynolds had bought a 4-bedroom home in the neighborhood for less than $40,000 in the early 2000s. They were told the waste was contained and the area was safe.

Former residents who had evacuated Love Canal were alarmed when new residents began to move in. Luella Kenny's 7-year-old son had died of kidney disease, and a new family later moved into the same home her family had abandoned. Kenny noted her son's autopsy had revealed the "same symptoms they see in animals that have been exposed to dioxin." She commented about the new residents, "The children are what bother me when I see them running around this neighborhood. I'm so frightened for them."

In 2013, when Lois Gibbs returned to visit the area, she was shocked that the containment site no longer had "danger" signs and the signs merely indicated "private property." She noted that someone house hunting in the area would not be put on alert that there were toxins in the area. Gibbs observed, "It's like a gated community for chemicals."

By 2013, residents of Black Creek Village complained of mysterious rashes, cysts and other ailments, as well as miscarriages. Initially, six families initiated lawsuits with notice that an addition 1100 claims might be coming. The lawsuits did not specify damages sought, but alleged that Love Canal was never properly remediated and dangerous toxins continued to leach onto residents' properties.

Hooker Chemical Company had dumped the chemicals in the 1940s and 1950s, but the company was bought in 1968 by Occidental Petroleum Corporation. In 1994, to settle a key civil lawsuit, Occidental agreed to pay the state of New York $25 million over 30 years. At one time, Occidental's liability in the case was estimated to be as much as $700 million, but U.S. District Judge John T. Curtin rejected the state's request for punitive damages, which might have totaled $270 million. After the settlement, in 1995, Occidental was tasked by the state of New York with monitoring the Love Canal site. Occidental shifted responsibility for maintaining the site to its subsidiary, Glenn Springs Holdings. The 2013 litigation largely sought to hold Occidental responsible. However, the corporation maintained that the waste was contained and state and federal agencies supported their position.

In 2024, a state court in New York dismissed 18 class-action lawsuits against OxyChem, another subsidiary of Occidental, because the court found the plaintiffs' claims were "speculative." The plaintiffs filed a notice of appeal.

== Controversies related to Wheatfield landfill ==
As remediation of the Love Canal site was attempted beginning in the 1970s, contamination was moved elsewhere. Waste equal in volume to 80 dump trucks was exhumed and shipped to out-of-state incinerators. However, some of the waste also ended up less than 10 miles away to a landfill owned by the Town of Wheatfield, which is located on the border of Wheatfield and North Tonawanda. The landfill had been operated by the Niagara Sanitation Company from 1964 to 1968 for municipal and industrial waste from plants including Carborundum, Bell Aerospace and Frontier Chemical. Residents near the landfill frequently complained of odors, exposed waste, discolored water and generally unsafe conditions, especially for children. In 1965, residents wrote to the city and asked the area be fenced.

In 1968, during the construction of the LaSalle Expressway in Niagara Falls, Love Canal waste was dug up, which ended up in the Wheatfield landfill. In 1982, a local newspaper report initially brought to light that Love Canal waste had ended up in the Wheatfield landfill. The Wheatfield municipal authorities ignored residents' concerns as hysteria, but in subsequent years many residents developed cancers, lupus, as well as other mysterious ailments that confounded doctors. In 2012, the state Department of Environmental Conservation reversed its long-term position that remediation of the landfill was unnecessary. In 2014, the DEC got Glenn Springs Holdings (the subsidiary of Occidental that was responsible for maintaining the Love Canal site) to pay for the removal of the Love Canal waste from the Wheatfield landfill. In December 2015, the landfill was declared a Superfund site.

A 2017 lawsuit asserts that Hooker's creation of a brine pipeline along the edge of the landfill, used to move brine from Wyoming County to its Niagara Falls plant location, may have created a conduit for the landfilled waste to leak out. Ironically, some of the residents who lived near the landfill had moved there when they were evacuated from their previous homes in Love Canal.

== See also ==
- 102nd Street chemical landfill, a landfill which is located immediately to the south of Love Canal.
- Cancer Alley (in Louisiana)
- Mossville, Louisiana
- Landfills in the United States
- Spring Valley, Washington, D.C.
- Times Beach, Missouri
- Valley of the Drums
- Centralia, Pennsylvania and its mine fire
- William Ginsberg, a member of the New York State task force which investigated the Love Canal Disaster in 1979, and the author of the state's report.
- The Killing Ground
