= List of landfills in the United States =

Notable Landfills in the United States

This is a list of landfills in the United States. A landfill is a site for the disposal of waste materials by burial and is the oldest form of waste treatment. Historically, landfills have been the most common method of organized waste disposal and remain so in many places around the world. Superfund sites are recognized by the government as being contaminated with hazardous substances as well as broadly defined "pollutants or contaminants" and in need of cleanup.

== Alabama ==
State of Alabama within the United States of America

Landfills in the state of Alabama
Name	City
Arrowhead Landfill	Uniontown
Black Warrior Solid Waste Facility	Coker
Brundidge Landfill	Brundidge
Chastang Landfill	Mt. Vernon
Morgan County Regional MSW Landfill	Trinity
City of Dothan Landfill	Dothan
Coffee County Sanitary Landfill	Elba
Cullman Environmental Waste Management Center	Cullman
Eastern Area Landfill	Birmingham
Florence Landfill	Florence
Huntsville Landfill	Huntsville
Irvington Landfill	Irvington
Jefferson County Landfill No.1	Gardendale
Jefferson County Landfill No.2	Pinson
Magnolia Subtitle D Landfill	Summerdale
Morris Farm Landfill	Hillsboro
New Georgia Landfill	Birmingham
North Montgomery Landfill	Montgomery
Pine View Landfill	Dora
Salem Landfill	Opelika
Sand Valley Landfill	Collinsville
Scottsboro Landfill	Hollywood
Shelby County Highway 70 Landfill	Columbiana
Star Ridge Landfill	Moody
Stones Throw Landfill	Tallassee
Three Corners Landfill	Piedmont
Timberlands Landfill	Brewton
Turkey Trot Landfill	Citronelle
Willow Ridge Landfill	Haleyville

== California ==
- BKK Landfill, West Covina - Largest hazardous waste landfill in the State
- Canal Area, San Rafael – The "East San Rafael" area (the eastern portion of the Canal Area between the Bay and San Quentin Ridge) was home to most of the garbage disposal sites in central Marin County.
- Chiquita Canyon Landfill, Castaic
- Eastlake Landfill, Clearlake
- Frank R. Bowerman Landfill, Orange County
- Fresno Municipal Sanitary Landfill, Fresno
- Junipero Serra Landfill, Colma, closed in 1983
- Kettleman Hills Hazardous Waste Facility, southwest of Kettleman City
- Newby Island landfill, Santa Clara County
- Olinda Landfill, Orange County
- Puente Hills Landfill, Los Angeles County, the largest landfill in the country (closed)
- Redwood Landfill, Marin County (Novato)
- Scholl Canyon Landfill, located in Glendale, California
- Shoreline Park, Mountain View, now a city park
- Sunshine Canyon Landfill, Sylmar, California
- Toyon Canyon Landfill, Los Angeles, closed in 1985

== Connecticut ==
- Laurel Park Incorporated, Naugatuck, closed in 1987

== Florida ==
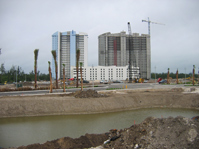
The Munisport Landfill in North Miami

- Mount Trashmore, Broward County
- Munisport, North Miami, ceased operating in 1980

== Georgia ==
- Grady Road Landfill
- Hercules 009 Landfill, Brunswick, a Superfund site
- Hickory Ridge Landfill, Conley
- Safeguard Landfill
- Taylor County Landfill

== Illinois ==
- Mallard Lake Landfill, DuPage County
- Lee County Landfill
- Livingston Landfill
- Landcomp Landfill
- Upper Rock Island County Landfill
- Prairie View Landfill

== Indiana ==
- Randolph Farms Landfill, Modoc
- Newton County Landfill
- National Serv-All Landfill
- United Refuse Landfill
- County Line Landfill
- Wabash Valley Landfill

== Kentucky ==
- Glen Lily Landfill, Warren County
- Outer Loop Recycling & Disposal Facility, Louisville

== Louisiana ==
- Agriculture Street Landfill, New Orleans

== Maine ==
- Juniper Ridge Landfill

== Maryland ==
- Alpha Ridge Landfill, Marriottsville
- Carr's Mill Landfill, Howard County
- Scarboro Landfill, Harford County, used until 1986

== Massachusetts ==
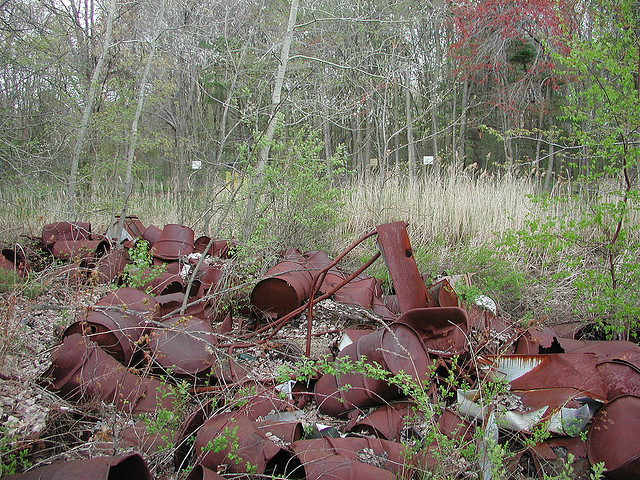
Rusting chemical waste drums at the Shpack Landfill site in May 2003

- Charles-George Reclamation Trust Landfill, Tyngsborough, a Superfund site
- Shpack Landfill, Norton, a Superfund site

== Michigan ==
- Carleton Farms Landfill, Sumpter Township

== Nevada ==
- Apex Landfill, Clark County

== New Jersey ==
- Kin-Buc Landfill, Edison, a Superfund site
- Ringwood Mines landfill site, Ringwood, used until the early 1970s, a Superfund site
- Rolling Knolls Landfill, Chatham Township

== New York ==
- Fountain Avenue and Pennsylvania Avenue Landfills, Brooklyn, former landfills
- Love Canal, Niagara Falls
- Pfohl Brothers Landfill, Cheektowaga, closed in 1971, a Superfund site
- Seneca Meadows Landfill, Seneca Falls
- Fresh Kills Landfill, Staten Island
- High Acres Landfill, Rochester
- Edgemere Landfill, Queens
- Cortland County Landfill

== North Carolina ==
- Highpoint C&D Landfill
- Red Rock Disposal Landfill
- Sampson County Landfill
- South Wake MSW Landfill
- Warren County PCB Landfill, now closed

== Ohio ==
- Krejci Dump, near Boston Heights, closed in 1986, a Superfund site
- Rumpke Sanitary Landfill, north of Cincinnati
- Tunnel Hill Reclamation Landfill, Subtitle D landfill in New Lexington, OH
- Apex Environmental Resources, Amsterdam, OH

== Pennsylvania ==
Municipal Landfills in Pennsylvania
Name	City / Borough
Fairless Landfill	Morrisville
SECCRA Landfill	West Grove
Bethlehem Landfill Company	Bethlehem
Commonwealth Environmental Systems	Hegins
Chrin Brothers Sanitary Landfill	Easton
Alliance Landfill	Taylor
Grand Central Sanitary Landfill	Pen Argyl
Keystone Sanitary Landfill	Dunmore
Advanced Disposal Services Sandy Run Landfill	Hopewell
Conestoga Landfill	Morgantown
Rolling Hills Landfill	Boyertown
Cumberland County Landfill	Shippensburg
LCSWMA Frey Farm Landfill	Conestoga
Greater Lebanon Refuse Authority Landfill	Lebanon
Lanchester Landfill	Narvon
Modern Landfill	York
Mountain View Reclamation	Greencastle
Pioneer Crossing	Birdsboro
IESI Blue Ridge Landfill	Scotland
Western Berks Landfill	Birdsboro
Bradford County Landfill	Burlington
Wayne Township Landfill	McElhattan
Lycoming County Landfill	Montgomery
Arden Landfill	Washington
Chestnut Valley Landfill	McClellandtown
Greenridge Reclamation	Scottdale
Imperial Landfill	Imperial
J.J. Brunner, Inc. Landfill	Zelienople
Kelly Run Sanitation	Elizabeth
Laurel Highland Landfill	Johnstown
South Hills Landfill	South Park
Monroeville Landfill	Monroeville
Mostoller Landfill	Somerset
Shade Landfill	Cairnbrook
Sanitary Landfill	Belle Vernon
Southern Alleghenies	Davidsville
Valley Landfill	Irwin
Greentree	Kersey
Lake View Landfill	Erie
McKean County Landfill	Kane
Northwest Sanitary Landfill	Sunbury
Seneca Landfill	Evans City
Evergreen Landfill	Coral

Construction/Demolition Waste Landfills in Pennsylvania
Name	City
Advanced Disposal Services Landfill	Elizabethtown
Tioga County C/D Landfill	Blossburg
Meadville Redi-Mix	Meadville
Blythe Recycling and Demolition (BRADS)	Blythe Township
Environmental and Recycling Services Inc. (ESRI)	Taylor

== Rhode Island ==
- Central Landfill, in Johnston

== South Carolina ==
- Curry Lake C&D Landfill
- L&L C&D Landfill
- Shiloh C&D Landfill

== Tennessee ==
- Decatur Landfill
- MiddlePoint Landfill, Murfreesboro, TN.

== Utah ==
- Rich County Landfill
- Logan City Landfill
- Little Mountain Landfill
- Mounding & Sons Landfill
- Wasatch Integrated Waste Landfill
- Summit County Henefer Landfill (Construction)
- Summit County 3-Mile Landfill
- Central Valley Landfill
- Mountain View Landfill
- Trans-Jordan Landfill
- Tooele County Landfill
- Clean Harbors Environmental Landfill (West Desert)
- Republic Services Wasatch Landfill
- Peck Rock Products & Landfill
- Tekoi Commercial Landfill
- 5-Mile Landfill
- North Pointe Construction and Demolition Landfill
- Intermountain Regional Landfill
- Uintah County Landfill
- Duchesne/Wasatch Bluebench Landfill
- Bayview Landfill
- Payson City Landfill
- Juab County Landfill
- Millard County Landfill
- Carbon County Landfill
- Emery County Landfill
- Moab Landfill
- Sevier County Landfill
- Beaver County Landfill
- Garfield County Landfill
- Northern Iron County Landfill
- Iron County Landfill
- Valley Landfill (Kane County)
- Western Kane County Landfill
- Washington County Landfill

== Vermont ==
- The Coventry, Vermont landfill is notable for being the only disposal site in the entire state. It is located near the Canadian border and near an international lake.

== Virginia ==
- Mount Trashmore, Virginia Beach, closed in 1978
- King George Landfill, King George, Virginia

== Washington ==
- Cedar Hills Regional Landfill, Maple Valley

== See also ==
- Landfills in the United States
- Socrates Sculpture Park, Long Island City, an outdoor museum and public park built atop an abandoned landfill and illegal dumpsite
- Mount Trashmore Park, Virginia Beach, Virginia
