= Mill Town: Reckoning with What Remains =

2020 book by Kerri Arsenault a

- Author: Kerri Arsenault
- Subject: Rumford Mill
- Genre: Part memoir, part investigative journalism
- Publisher: St. Martin's Press
- Publication date: 2020
- ISBN: 978-1250155931

Mill Town: Reckoning with What Remains is a 2020 book by Kerri Arsenault about the paper and pulp industry in the American city Rumford, Maine.

The book focusses on Rumford Mill and perceptions about the mill's health impact on the local community.

Reviewers described the book as part memoir and part exposé and firmly neither, making the claims in the book difficult to critique. Aside from the genre ambiguity, the book received positive critical reception.

== Publication ==
Mill Town is a memoir, written by Kerri Arsenault, a Maine-based Acadian. Arsenault grew up in Mexico, Maine, near the United States border not far from Rumford. Mill Town is her first book.

== Synopsis ==
The book is about the small, rural town of Mexico, Maine, where for over 100 years the community orbited around a paper mill that provided jobs for nearly everyone in town, including three generations of Arsenault's family. While she had a happy childhood, years after she moved away, she realized the price she paid for that childhood. The price everyone paid. The mill, while providing the social, cultural, and economic cohesion for the community, also contributed to its demise. This is a book about environmental and family legacies.

== Critical reception ==
The book won the Rachel Carson Environmental Book Award in 2021 and the Maine Literary Award for Nonfiction the same year. The Italian translation won a special Inge Feltrinelli Prize, dedicated to women writers who have used their voices in defense of human rights. Mill Town was also a finalist for the Connecticut Book Awards, the Eric Zencey Prize in Environmental Economics, the National Book Critics Circle Leonard Prize for best first book in any genre, the New England Society Book Award, and was a bestseller for the American Bookseller Association and the New England Independent Booksellers Association. It was a New York Times Editors Choice and received starred reviews from Kirkus and Publishers Weekly, and acclaim from Chicago Tribune's "Top 10 books of 2020; Publishers Weekly "Best Books of 2020; Publishers Weekly "Top 10 books for Politics & Current Events", 2020; Barnes & Noble's "Essential Election Reading", 2020; Oprah magazine's "Best Books of Fall 2020"; Newsweek's "Fall Must-Read Fall Nonfiction"; People magazine's "Best New Books", 2020; Indie Next Pick, 2020; Amazon Editors' pick "Best Biographies and Memoirs 2020"; Literary Hub's favorite books of 2020; Barnes & Noble's "Best Social Science Books 2020"; Literary Hub's "September's Best Reviewed Memoirs and Biographies", 2020; Junior Library Guild selection, 2021; Mr. Porter's "Ultimate Guide To Labor Day Weekend 2020; BuzzFeed's "Twenty-one books to get excited about this Fall", 2020; Literary Hub's "Most Anticipated Books of 2020"; The Revelator's "New Environmental Books to Motivate Action", 2020; Goodreads' "September 2020 top History/Biography Pick; The Millions' "Most Anticipated Books", 2020; Goodreads "Six Great Books of Fall 2020"; National Review "Hot 5 Books", 2020; and Alma's "Favorite Books for Fall 2020"

Emily Cooke writing for The New York Times describes the writing as "earnest" and notes the opaqueness of a book that is part memoir part investigative journalism, but concretely neither, which was Arsenault's goal. Alex Hanson, writing in Los Angeles Review of Books made the same observation. Michael Berry, writing in the Portland Press Herald described the book as an "intelligent mix of memoir and reportage."

== See also ==
- List of environmental books
- Old Town paper mill, mill elsewhere in Maine owned by the same company, ND Paper
