= List of Superfund sites in Massachusetts =

This is a list of Superfund sites in Massachusetts designated under the Comprehensive Environmental Response, Compensation, and Liability Act (CERCLA) environmental law. The CERCLA federal law of 1980 authorized the United States Environmental Protection Agency (EPA) to create a list of polluted locations requiring a long-term response to clean up hazardous material contaminations. These locations are known as Superfund sites, and are placed on the National Priorities List (NPL).

The NPL guides the EPA in "determining which sites warrant further investigation" for environmental remediation. As of November 29, 2010, there were 31 Superfund sites on the National Priorities List in Massachusetts. One additional site is currently proposed for entry on the list. Four sites have been cleaned up and removed from the list.

== Superfund sites ==
Proposed for addition to National Priorities List
Deleted from National Priorities List

=== Military sites ===
CERCLIS ID	Name	County	Reason	Proposed	Listed	Construction completed	Partially deleted	Deleted
MA2570024487	Otis Air National Guard Base (USAF)	Barnstable		07/14/1989	11/21/1989	–	10/26/2007	–
MAD980520670	Fort Devens-Sudbury Training Annex (USARMY)	Middlesex	Volatile organic compounds (VOCs), pesticides, and inorganics above drinking water standards.	07/14/1989	02/21/1990	09/19/2000	–	01/29/2002
MA8570024424	Hanscom Field/Hanscom Air Force Base (USAF)	Middlesex		05/10/1993	05/31/1994	09/28/2007	–	–
MA0213820939	Materials Technology Laboratory (USARMY)	Middlesex		06/23/1993	05/31/1994	09/29/2005	11/22/1999	11/21/2006
MA1210020631	Natick Laboratory Army Research, Development, & Engineering Center (USARMY)	Middlesex	Soil, groundwater, and surface water are contaminated with various VOCs, naphthalene, Freon 113, and a variety of heavy metals such as barium, mercury, arsenic, copper, chromium, lead, and zinc.	05/10/1993	05/31/1994	–	–	–
MA6170023570	Naval Weapons Industrial Reserve Plant (USNAVY)	Middlesex		06/23/1993	05/31/1994	–	–	–
MA2170022022	South Weymouth Naval Air Station (USNAVY)	Norfolk		06/23/1993	05/31/1994	–	–	–
MA7210025154	Fort Devens (USARMY)	Worcester and Middlesex		07/14/1989	11/21/1989	–	–	–

=== Commercial sites ===
CERCLIS ID	Name	Town/City	County	Reason	Proposed	Listed	Construction completed	Partially deleted	Deleted
MAD001031574	Creese and Cook Tannery (former)	Danvers	Essex		09/18/2012	–	–	–	–
MAD001197755	Walton & Lonsbury	Attleboro	Bristol		–	–	–	–	–
MAD002084093	GE-Pittsfield and Housatonic River	Pittsfield and Lenox	Berkshire		09/25/1997		–	–	–
MAD980524169	Rose Disposal Pit	Lanesborough	Berkshire		10/15/1984	06/10/1986	09/20/1994	–	–
MAD001026319	Atlas Tack Corp.	Fairhaven	Bristol						
MAD001060805	Hatheway and Patterson Company	Mansfield	Bristol						
MAD980731335	New Bedford Site	New Bedford, Fairhaven, Acushnet, and Dartmouth	Bristol						
MAD980520621	Re-Solve, Inc.	Dartmouth	Bristol						
MAD980503973	Shpack Landfill	Attleboro and Norton	Bristol		10/15/1984	06/10/1986	–	–	09/05/2017
MAD980731343	Sullivan's Ledge	New Bedford	Bristol						
MAD980732317	Groveland Wells	Groveland	Essex						
MAD980523336	Haverhill Municipal Landfill	Haverhill	Essex						
MAD980525240	Salem Acres	Salem	Essex		10/15/1984	06/10/1986	09/23/1999	–	07/23/2001
MAD980731483	PSC Resources	Palmer	Hampden						
MAD003809266	Charles-George Reclamation Trust Landfill	Tyngsborough	Middlesex		10/23/1981				
MAD076580950	Industri-Plex	Woburn	Middlesex						
MAD051787323	Iron Horse Park	Billerica	Middlesex						
MAD062166335	Nuclear Metals, Inc.	Concord	Middlesex	Radioactive waste, 1,4-dioxane, and VOCs in on-site landfill, soil, and groundwater	07/27/2000	06/14/2001	–	–	–
MAD990685422	Nyanza Chemical Waste Dump	Ashland	Middlesex		10/23/1981	09/08/1983			
MAD001403104	Olin Chemical	Wilmington	Middlesex						
MAD000192393	Silresim Chemical Corp.	Lowell	Middlesex						
MAD980520696	Sutton Brook Disposal Area	Tewksbury	Middlesex						
MAD001002252	W.R. Grace & Co., Inc. (Acton Plant)	Acton and Concord	Middlesex		12/30/1982	09/08/1983	–	–	–
MAD980732168	Wells G&H	Woburn	Middlesex		12/30/1982	09/08/1983	–	–	–
MAD001041987	Baird & McGuire	Holbrook	Norfolk		12/30/1982	09/08/1983			
MAD982191363	Blackburn & Union Privileges	Walpole	Norfolk						
MAD980670566	Norwood PCBs	Norwood	Norfolk						
MAD079510780	Cannon Engineering Corp. (CEC)	Bridgewater	Plymouth						
MAD980525232	Plymouth Harbor/Cannon Engineering Corp.	Plymouth	Plymouth		12/30/1982	09/08/1983	05/29/1992	–	11/19/1993
MAD980732341	Hocomonco Pond	Westborough	Worcester		12/30/1982	09/08/1983	09/22/1999	–	–

== See also ==
- List of Superfund sites in the United States
- List of environmental issues
- List of waste types
- TOXMAP
