= Zhang Yin =

Zhang Yin may refer to:

- Zhang Yin (entrepreneur) (born 1957), Chinese entrepreneur
- Zhang Yin (painter) (1761–1829), Chinese painter of the Qing Dynasty
