= Mendo Mill =

Mendo Mill & Lumber
- Company type: Hardware store
- Industry: Hardware; Lumber
- Founded: 1944; 81 years ago
- Founders: Ross Mayfield; John Mayfield
- Number of locations: 5
- Parent: Ace Hardware (affiliate)
- Website: mendomill.com

Mendo Mill & Lumber is a chain of 5 hardware stores in the Lake and Mendocino counties.

== History ==
In 1944, original owners and World War II veterans Ross and John Mayfield moved to California where they opened a lumber mill on Orr Springs road in Ukiah, California. It remained in operation there until the 1950s, when the Mayfields opened a hardware store on North State Street after their children started high school. In the 1960s the company was purchased by Joe, a son of one of the Mayfield families who expanded the original Ukiah location to its current size including an area to purchase items to help build a house which current owner Mike Mayfield claimed was "Pioneering" in that it was the first to do so before the "big box" stores. A third location was established on East Commercial Street in Willits sometime in the 1970s while a fourth was opened in Clearlake, California later that same decade. A Fort Bragg, California location was established in the mid-80s. In 2000 Mike Mayfield was appointed CEO in 2000 after Joe retired. On July 28, 2010, it was reported that Mendo Mill purchased Piedmont Lumber in Lakeport for an undisclosed amount.
