= Rumford Mill =

Pulp mill and paper mill in Maine, US

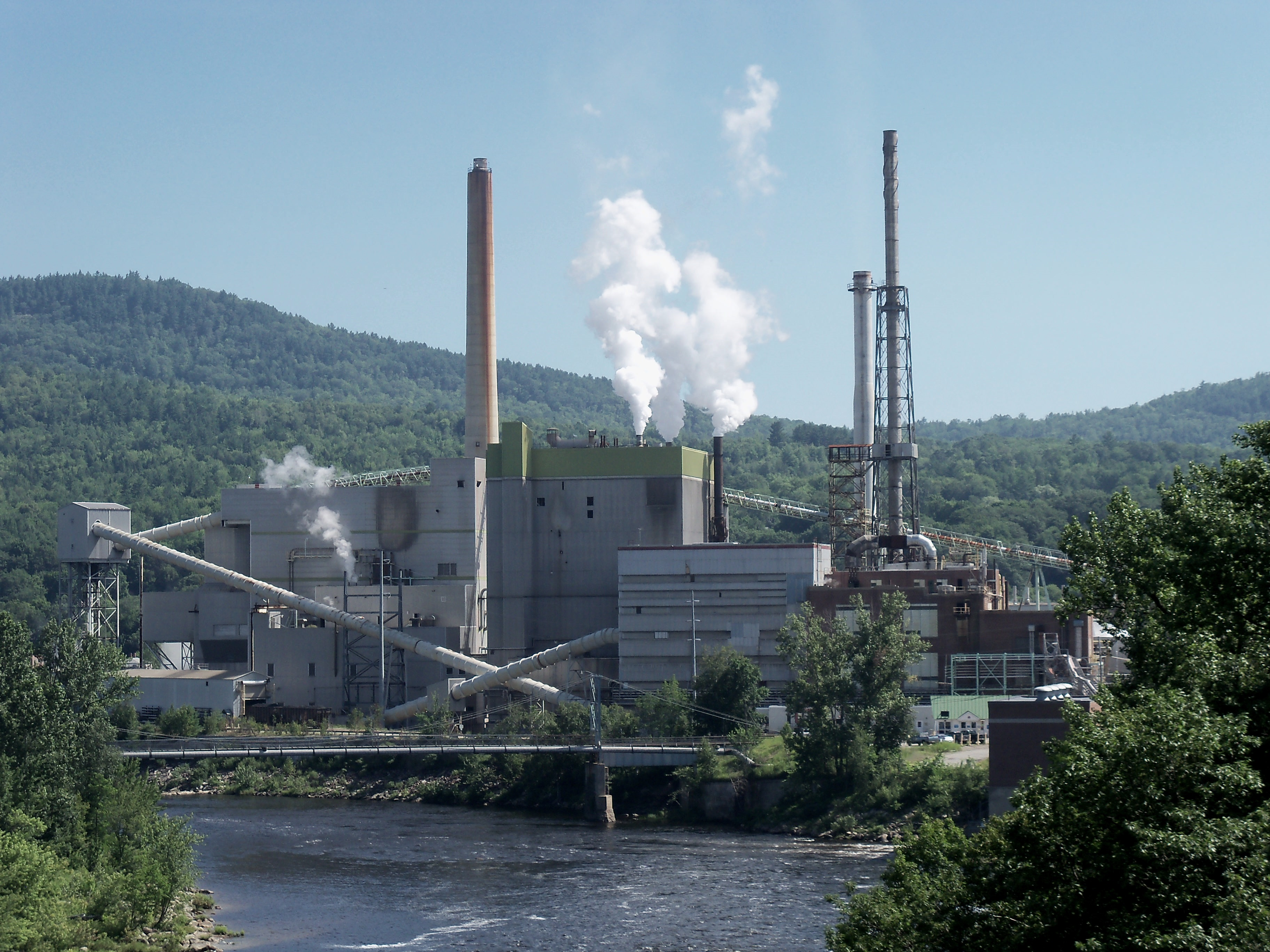

- Location within Maine
- Built: 1901
- Location: Rumford, Maine, United States
- Coordinates: 44.5505°N 70.5408°W
- Industry: Pulp and paper
- Products: Paper
- Employees: 621 (2016)
- Owner: ND Paper (subsidiary of Nine Dragons Paper Holdings Limited)

Rumford Mill is a pulp mill and paper mill located in the United States town of Rumford, Maine. The mill has two kraft pulp lines and three paper machines. The mill produces 460,000 tonnes of kraft pulp and 565,000 tonnes of paper annually. The mill has 621 employees as of 2016. Now owned by ND Paper LLC, a wholly owned subsidiary of Nine Dragons Paper Holdings Limited, the mill is now known as ND Paper–Rumford Mill.

== History ==
The mill was established in 1901 by Hugh J. Chisholm. He had established the Portland and Rumford Falls Railway, which was completed in 1892 and aimed at exploiting the falls to manufacture paper. The Oxford Paper Company grew out of this mill and remained owned by the Chisholm family until 1967. Rumford was the sole manufacturer of US Post Office postcards, as well as the country's largest bookpaper manufacturer. Ownership passed to Ethyl Corporation in 1967, Boise Cascade Paper Company in 1976, Mead Corporation in 1996, Cerberus Capital Management as NewPage in 2005 and Catalyst Paper in 2015. In 2018 the mill was acquired by Nine Dragons Paper Holdings Limited.

== In popular culture ==
The mill is the focus of Kerri Arsenault's part memoir part investigative reporting book of 2020 Mill Town. In the book, Arsenault shares her views about the health impacts from the mill.

== Environmental impact ==
In 2021, this plant was one of the top five polluters in the state of Maine

== See also ==
- Old Town paper mill, owned by the same company
