= Old Town paper mill =

Paper factory in Maine, United States

- Location within Maine
- Built: 1860
- Operated: 1860 - 2015; 2018 - 2023
- Location: Old Town, Maine, Maine, United States
- Coordinates: 44.91°N 68.63°W
- Industry: Pulp and paper
- Products: Pulp
- Employees: 199 (2023)
- Buildings: 400,000 square feet
- Owner: ND Paper (subsidiary of Nine Dragons Paper Holdings Limited)
- Website: us.ndpaper.com/old-town/
- Defunct: April 2023

Local impacts
- Pollution: Sodium hydroxide
- Impacted: Penobscot River, Penobscot Indian Nation

Old Town paper mill is an American paper factory in Old Town, Maine.

Originally a saw mill, the factory was founded in 1860 and converted into a paper mill in 1882. Operations ceased in 2015 and restarted in 2018 when the plant was purchased by Nine Dragons Paper Holdings Limited subsidiary ND Paper. Activities stopped in 2023, amidst rising energy and pulp costs.

When operating, the mill's effluent was emitted into the Penobscot River, a source of fish for the Penobscot Indian Nation. The nation has been advised to limit fish consumption since 1987. The mill contaminated the river with sodium hydroxide in 2020 and 2022.

== Description ==
Old Town paper mill is 400,000 square-foot paper mill on Portland Avenue in Old Town, Maine located adjacent to a 19th-century cemetery. Four thousand feet of the site borders the Penobscot River, and the mill is located near the University of Maine.

In 2003, the mill employed 500 people; in 2023 it had 199 workers. Workers voted to join Local 80 of the United Steelworkers union prior to the mill's 2018 change of ownership.

The mill, which has a 16-megawatt biomass boiler, produced 150,000 tons of pulp in 2015. The mill has a wastewater treatment facility that also treats runoff from Juniper Ridge Landfill. Since 1960, when operational, the mill discharged 18 million gallons of waste water into the Penobscot River on a daily basis.

== History ==
The mill started operations in 1860, originally functioning as a sawmill, converting to a paper mill in 1882. The mill was originally owned by the Penobscot Chemical Fiber Company, which merged with Diamond International in 1967 and was bought by the James River Corporation in 1983. Between 1983 and 2015, owners included Fort James, Georgia-Pacific and Expera Specialty Solutions. Legal disputes around the mill's proposed sale in July 2017 saw litigation and an injunction attempt from Samuel Eakin of Relentless Capital Company, who alleged that then-owners asset-liquidation consortium MFGR breached their contract to sell the plant to him.

Since 1987, members of the Penobscot Indian Nation in the Penobscot Reservation, have been advised to limit fish consumption from the Penobscot River, due to the mill's effluents.

The mill ceased operations in 2015 and restarted in 2018, when it was purchased by Illinois-headquartered ND Paper, a subsidiary of Chinese company Nine Dragons Paper Holdings Limited. The purchased happened shortly after the Government of China launched Operation National Sword, a policy initiative that increased the regulation of waste import to China. After purchasing the plant, ND paper expanded the operations of the mill to create animal feedstock from the fibres produced at the mill. During the takeover, Zhang Yin, founder of Nine Dragons Paper Holdings promised to operate the mill for 100 years, noting that while demand for pulp was dwindling in the United States, it was escalating in China.

Over 30,000 gallons of sodium hydroxide had spilled into Penobscot River via a floor drain starting on October 7, 2020. On June 29, 2022, the mill spilled another 1,076 gallons of sodium hydroxide via the same floor drain. The same year, two neighbours of the mill launched a class action lawsuit, seeking damages from the impact of odours they claimed were emitted from the mill. In 2023, ND Paper was fined $101,400 by the Maine Department of Environmental Protection in response to the 2020 spill.

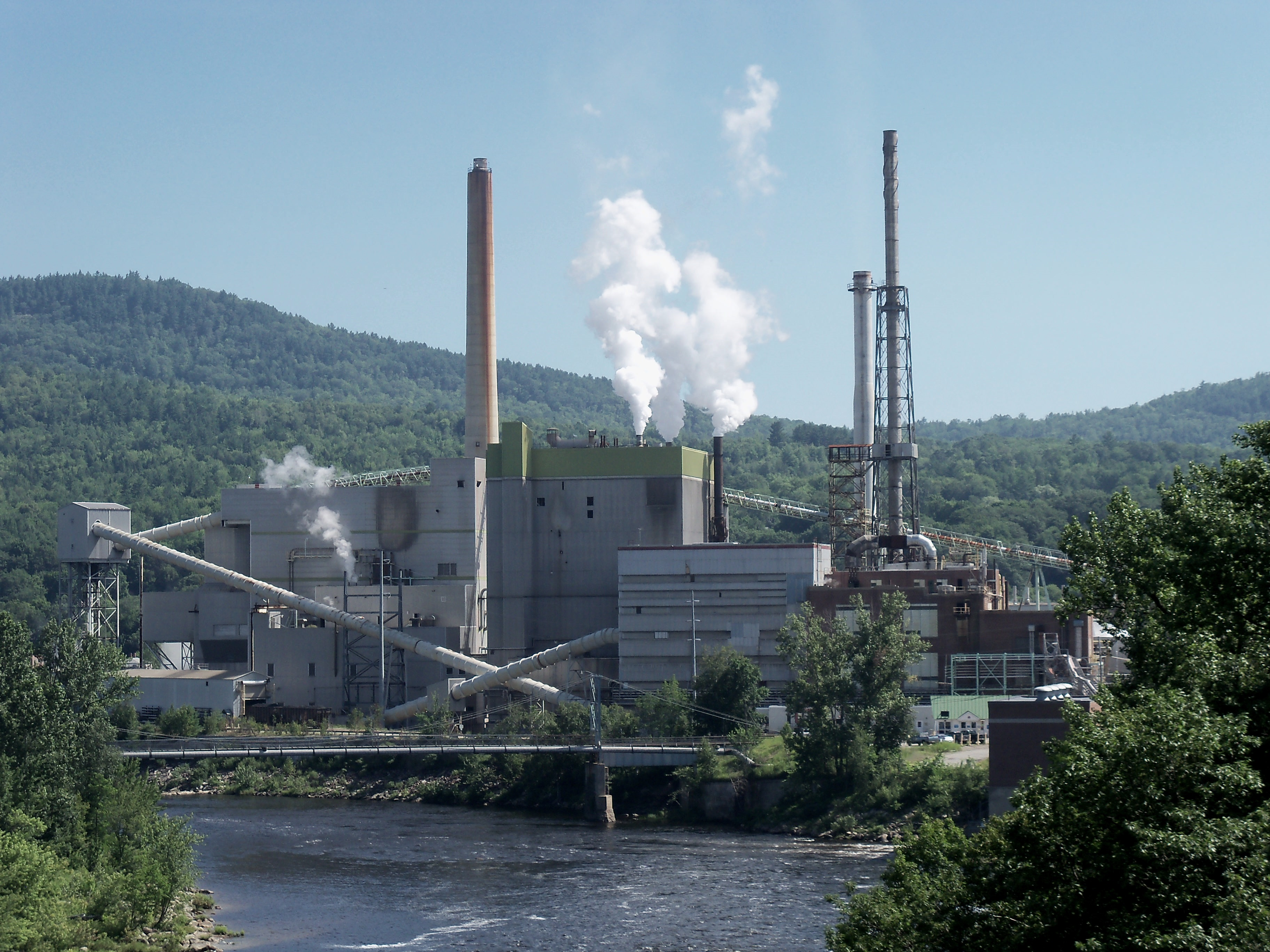
Rumford paper mill

In March 2023, ND Paper announced the closure of the mill, scheduled for April 2023. The company indicated that employees would be offered jobs at their Rumford Mill, located 125 miles away. The company attributed the closure to the high cost of electricity and wood pulp.

== See also ==
- List of paper mills
- Biron Mill, owned by the same company
- Catawba paper mill
