= List of Superfund sites in Louisiana =

This is a list of Superfund sites in Louisiana designated under the Comprehensive Environmental Response, Compensation, and Liability Act (CERCLA) environmental law. The CERCLA federal law of 1980 authorized the United States Environmental Protection Agency (EPA) to create a list of polluted locations requiring a long-term response to clean up hazardous material contaminations. These locations are known as Superfund sites, and are placed on the National Priorities List (NPL).

The NPL guides the EPA in "determining which sites warrant further investigation" for environmental remediation. As of May 3, 2010, there were nine Superfund sites on the National Priorities List in Louisiana. Three more sites have been proposed for entry on the list and eleven others have been cleaned up and removed from it.

== Superfund sites ==
Proposed for addition to National Priorities List
Deleted from National Priorities List

CERCLIS ID	Name	Parish	Reason	Proposed	Listed	Construction completed	Partially deleted	Deleted
LAD981056997	Agriculture Street Landfill	Orleans	A former city disposal area was partially redeveloped, with around 390 houses. Groundwater, which is not used by humans, is contaminated by metals. Soil is contaminated by lead, arsenic and carcinogenic PAHs. Contaminated topsoil has been removed and subsoil and waste has been capped.	08/23/1994	12/16/1994	04/02/2002	06/15/2000	–
LAD000239814	American Creosote Works, Inc. (Winn Parish)	Winn	Soil and groundwater contamination by PCP, carcinogenic PAHs and creosote.	02/07/1992	14/10/1992	06/04/1999	–	–
LAD980745632	Bayou Bonfouca	St. Tammany	Former wood treatment operations caused severe creosote and PAH contamination of the bayou and its sediments. Approximately 1.5 miles of the bayou were rendered biologically sterile and divers suffered second-degree chemical burns from the contamination.	12/30/1982	09/08/1983	09/30/1997	–	–
LAD980745541	Bayou Sorrel Site	Iberville	Soil and sediments were contaminated by the dumping of process wastes from pesticide and herbicide manufacturing, sulfide-contaminated waste from hydrocarbon processing and exploration and spent wash from industrial equipment cleaning.	12/30/1982	09/08/1983	05/26/1992	–	09/29/1997
LAD008187940	Central Wood Preserving Co.	East Feliciana	Soil and sediment contamination by arsenic, copper, chromium and creosote from former wood treatment operations.	01/19/1999	05/10/1999	09/08/2004	–	09/18/2009
LAD980501456	Cleve Reber	Ascension	Former municipal and industrial landfill site had exposed, deteriorating and possibly exploded drums containing sulfur, asphalt, tars, plastics, and oily wastes including hexachlorobenzene and hexachlorobutadiene. The site also contained further buried drums, four ponds and piles of solid waste. Groundwater was contaminated and there was potential for contamination of the deep drinking water aquifer.	12/30/1982	09/08/1983	12/31/1996	–	12/30/1997
LAD072606627	Combustion, Inc.	Livingston	A former waste oil recycling facility contained above- and below-ground storage tanks, associated buildings and storage ponds. Groundwater is contaminated by VOCs. Contaminated soil and wastes from tanks and buildings have been removed, the tanks and buildings have been demolished and contaminated surface water has been treated and discharged.	06/20/1986 06/24/1988	08/30/1990	06/26/2006	–	–
LAD052510344	Delatte Metals	Tangipahoa	Soil contamination by lead from former battery recycling operations. Groundwater contamination by lead and acid does not affect underlying drinking water aquifer.	07/28/1988	01/19/1999	09/22/2003	–	08/08/2005
LAD981155872	Devil's Swamp Lake	East Baton Rouge	Lakewater and a drainage ditch leading to a former industrial site are contaminated by PCBs.	03/08/2004	–	–	–	–
LAD981058019	D.L. Mud, Inc.	Vermilion	Soil and sludges were contaminated by barium, mercury, chromium, arsenic, lead, zinc and petroleum-related hydrocarbons from a former drilling mud processing facility.	06/24/1988	10/04/1989	06/30/1999	–	03/07/2000
LAD980879449	Dutchtown Treatment Plant	Ascension	Waste oil, soil and surface water were contaminated by benzene, ethylbenzene, toluene, xylene and lead. Waste oil has been removed and incinerated, surface water has been treated and soil has been washed and stabilized.	01/22/1987	07/22/1987	01/12/1998	–	11/16/1999
LAD980750137	Gulf Coast Vacuum Services	Vermilion	Sludge and shallow groundwater was contaminated by benzene, toluene, mercury, lead, chromium, arsenic, barium and various organic compounds. Soil was contaminated by arsenic and barium.	06/24/1988	03/31/1989	09/20/1999	–	07/23/2001
LAD985169317	Gulf State Utilities-North Ryan Street	Calcasieu	River sediments contaminated by PAHs from coal gasification operations and site soil contaminated by PAHs, VOCs and PCBs from coal gasification and former landfill activities.	02/13/1995	–	–	–	–
LAD981054075	Highway 71/72 (Old Citgo) Refinery	Bossier	A former oil refinery site has been redeveloped. Soil contaminated by lead has been removed from the site. Benzene contamination of indoor air in some properties has been rectified. Groundwater is contaminated by a light non-aqueous phase liquid layer.	02/13/1995	–	–	–	–
LAD981054075	Lincoln Creosote	Bossier	Soil contamination by creosote-related PAHs, semi-volatile organic compounds, PCP, chromium, copper and arsenic has been remediated by replacing the contaminated soil with clean soil.	01/18/1994	Withdrawn 07/28/1998	–	–	–
LA0213820533	Louisiana Army Ammunition Plant	Webster	Groundwater is contaminated with RDX and TNT. Contaminated soils and sludges have been incinerated but there is the possibility of soil contamination by VOCs, explosives and metals in other areas of the plant.	10/15/1984	03/13/1989	–	–	–
LAD981522998	Madisonville Creosote Works	St. Tammany	Soil and groundwater contamination by PAHs from a defunct wood treatment facility. Over 12,000 gallons of creosote have so far been recovered from a dense non-aqueous phase liquid layer below the site.	06/17/1996	12/23/1996	06/16/2000	–	–
LA0000187518	Mallard Bay Landing Bulk Plant	Cameron	Waste sludge in tanks at an inactive oil refinery and storage facility contained elevated levels of VOCs and heavy metals and nearby wetland sediment was contaminated by heavy metals. The site has been dismantled, waste sludges have been incinerated and contaminated soil and sediments have been disposed of appropriately.	05/11/2000	07/27/2000	09/18/2003	–	09/19/2005
LAD008473142	Marion Pressure Treating	Union	Creosote waste was removed from the site of a former wood treatment facility in 1997 and contaminated soil and debris was placed in a containment area on site and made safe. However, erosion now threatens the containment area. Low-level soil and creek sediment PAH contamination may remain.	01/22/1999	02/04/2000	–	–	–
LAD980745533	Old Inger Oil Refinery	Ascension	Soil, waste oil sludges and on-site surface water were contaminated by VOCs, PAHs and heavy metals from oil refinery waste processing and a spill that caused the site to be abandoned.	12/30/1982	09/08/1983	09/12/2006	–	08/12/2008
LAD980749139	PAB Oil & Chemical Service, Inc.	Vermilion	A disposal facility for drilling mud and other oilfield waste contained soil, sludges, surface water and sediments contaminated with elevated levels of barium, arsenic and PAHs.	06/24/1988	3/31/1989	08/28/1998	–	01/03/2000
LAD057482713	Petro-Processors of Louisiana, Inc.	East Baton Rouge	Soil, surface water and sediments at two petrochemical waste disposal sites contaminated by chlorinated hydrocarbons, PAHs, heavy metals and oils. Groundwater was contaminated by a significant non-aqueous phase liquid layer, from which nearly one million gallons of organic compounds were recovered.	09/08/1983	09/21/1984	07/31/2003	–	–
LAD985185107	Ruston Foundry	Rapides	Soil and slag contaminated by lead and antimony and asbestos-containing material waste have been removed to a hazardous waste landfill site.	01/19/1999	05/10/1999	09/03/2008	–	–
LAD008149015	Southern Shipbuilding	St. Tammany	Soil was contaminated by lead, copper and other metals, PAHs, PCBs and asbestos. Sludges were contaminated by PAHs and sediments by tributyl tin. Surface water contamination was below levels requiring cleanup.	02/13/1995	05/26/1995	09/15/1997	–	06/16/1998

== See also ==
- List of Superfund sites in the United States
- List of environmental issues
- List of waste types
- TOXMAP
