= List of Superfund sites in Georgia =

This is a list of Superfund sites in Georgia designated under the Comprehensive Environmental Response, Compensation, and Liability Act (CERCLA) environmental law. The CERCLA federal law of 1980 authorized the United States Environmental Protection Agency (EPA) to create a list of polluted locations requiring a long-term response to clean up hazardous material contaminations. These locations are known as Superfund sites, and are placed on the National Priorities List (NPL).

The NPL guides the EPA in "determining which sites warrant further investigation" for environmental remediation. As of November 13, 2014, there were 16 Superfund sites on the National Priorities List in Georgia. One additional site has been proposed for entry on the list. Five sites have been cleaned up and removed from the list.

== Superfund sites ==
Proposed for addition to National Priorities List
Deleted from National Priorities List

CERCLIS ID	Name	County	Reason	Proposed	Listed	Construction completed	Partially deleted	Deleted
GAN000410033	Armstrong World Industries	Bibb		10/21/2010	09/16/2011	–	–	–
GAD003302676	Macon Naval Ordnance Plant	Bibb		03/15/2012	05/24/2013	–	–	–
GAD990855819	Luminous Processes, Inc.	Clarke	Radioactive contamination associated with luminous watch and clock painting, including radium	10/23/1981	–	12/30/1982	–	12/30/1982
GAD990855074	Firestone Tire & Rubber Co. (Albany Plant)	Dougherty	Inorganics, Metals, PAH, PCBs, VOC	06/24/1988	10/04/1989	09/28/1998	–	–
GA7170023694	Marine Corps Logistics Base	Dougherty	Base Neutral Acids, Metals, PAH, PCBs, VOC	07/14/1989	11/21/1989	09/28/2011	–	–
GAD042101261	T.H. Agriculture & Nutrition (Albany)	Dougherty	Base Neutral Acids, Halogenated SVOCs, Inorganics, Metals, PAH, persistent organic pollutants, Pesticides, VOC	06/24/1988	03/31/1989	–	–	–
GAD981024466	Brunswick Wood Preserving	Glynn	Base Neutral Acids, Dioxins/Dibenzofurans, Metals, PAH, Persistent Organic Pollutants, Pesticides, VOC	12/23/1996	04/01/1997	09/27/2012	–	–
GAD980556906	Hercules 009 Landfill	Glynn	Soil, sludge, groundwater, and surfacewater were contaminated with toxaphene, benzene, TCE, toluene, xylenes, dioxin, pesticides, arsenic, chromium, and lead.	09/08/1983	09/21/1984	09/24/1999	–	–
GAD099303182	LCP Chemicals Georgia	Glynn	Inorganics	10/02/1995	06/17/1996	–	–	–
GAD982112658	Terry Creek Dredge Spoil Areas/Hercules Outfall	Glynn		04/01/1997	–	–	–	–
GA1570024330	Robins Air Force Base (Landfill #4/Sludge lagoon)	Houston	Metals, PAH, Persistent Organic Pollutants, Pesticides, VOC	10/15/1984	07/22/1987	09/30/2004	–	–
GAD008212409	Camilla Wood Preserving Company	Mitchell	Base Neutral Acids, Dioxins/Dibenzofurans, Metals, PAH, Pesticides, VOC	03/06/1998	07/28/1998	–	–	–
GAD980496954	Powersville Site	Peach	Metals, Persistent Organic Pollutants, Pesticides, VOC	09/08/1983	09/21/1984	06/30/1993	–	11/01/2010
GAD003269578	Woolfolk Chemical Works, Inc.	Peach	Base Neutral Acids, Dioxins/Dibenzofurans, Halogenated SVOCs, Metals, PAH, PCBs, Persistent Organic Pollutants, Pesticides, VOC	06/24/1988	08/30/1990	–	–	–
GAD095840674	Cedartown Industries, Inc.	Polk	Metals	06/24/1988	02/21/1990	05/08/1997	–	09/19/2006
GAD980495402	Cedartown Municipal Landfill	Polk	Base Neutral Acids, Inorganics, Metals, PAH, VOC	06/24/1988	03/31/1989	08/16/1996	–	03/10/1999
GAD990741092	Diamond Shamrock Corp. Landfill	Polk	Metals, VOC	01/22/1987	08/30/1990	09/29/1995	–	–
GAD033582461	Alternate Energy Resources	Richmond	PAH, Petroleum Hydrocarbon, VOC	09/14/2005	04/19/2006	–	–	–
GAD001700699	Monsanto Corp. (Augusta Plant)	Richmond	Groundwater contaminated with arsenic.	09/08/1983	09/21/1984	05/05/1993	–	03/09/1998
GAN000407449	Peach Orchard Road PCE Groundwater Plume	Richmond	Groundwater contaminated with PCE.	04/27/2005	09/14/2005	09/18/2013	–	–
GAD991275686	Marzone Inc./Chevron Chemical Co.	Tift	Dioxins/Dibenzofurans, Metals, Nitrate/Nitrite, Persistent Organic Pollutants, Pesticides, VOC	06/24/1988	10/04/1989	–	–	–
GAD980838619	Mathis Brothers Landfill (South Marble Top Road)	Walker	Base Neutral Acids, Dioxins/Dibenzofurans, Inorganics, Metals, Nitroaromatics, PAH, Pesticides, VOC	01/22/1987	03/31/1989	09/28/1998	–	–
GAN000407160	Westside Lead	Fulton	Elevated lead levels in soil samples and presence of industrial smelting slag	9/9/2021	3/16/2022	–	–	–

== See also ==
- List of Superfund sites in the United States
- List of environmental issues
- List of waste types
- TOXMAP
