= List of Superfund sites in Kentucky =

This is a list of Superfund sites in Kentucky designated under the Comprehensive Environmental Response, Compensation, and Liability Act (CERCLA) environmental law. The CERCLA federal law of 1980 authorized the United States Environmental Protection Agency (EPA) to create a list of polluted locations requiring a long-term response to clean up hazardous material contaminations. These locations are known as Superfund sites, and are placed on the National Priorities List (NPL). The NPL guides the EPA in "determining which sites warrant further investigation" for environmental remediation. As of November 29, 2010, there were 14 Superfund sites on the National Priorities List in Kentucky. No additional sites are currently proposed for entry on the list. Six sites have been cleaned up and removed from the list.

== Superfund sites ==
Proposed for addition to National Priorities List
Deleted from National Priorities List

CERCLIS ID	Name	County	Reason	Proposed	Listed	Construction completed	Partially deleted	Deleted
KYD980500961	A.L. Taylor (Valley of the Drums)	Bullitt		12/30/1982	09/08/1983	08/10/1990	–	05/17/1996
KYD041981010	Airco	Marshall						
KYD006370167	B.F. Goodrich	Marshall						
KYD981019839	Bowling Green Old Landfill	Warren						
KYD980501019	Brantley Landfill	McLean						
KYD045738291	Caldwell Lace Leather Co., Inc.	Logan						
KYD980602155	Distler Brickyard	Hardin						
KYD980601975	Distler Farm	Jefferson						
KYD980844625	Fort Hartford Coal Co. Stone Quarry	Ohio						
KYD006371074	General Tire & Rubber (Mayfield Landfill)	Graves		06/24/1988	02/21/1990	10/01/1993	–	10/27/2000
KYD980501076	Green River Disposal, Inc.	Daviess		06/24/1988	08/30/1990	09/22/2000	–	
KYD980501191	Howe Valley Landfill	Hardin		06/10/1986	07/22/1987	09/29/1994	–	07/26/1996
KYD980557052	Lee's Lane Landfill	Jefferson		12/30/1982	09/08/1983	03/18/1988	–	04/25/1996
KYD980729107	Maxey Flats Nuclear Disposal	Fleming		10/15/1984	06/10/1986	–	–	–
KYD985069954	National Electric Coil/Cooper Industries	Harlan		07/29/1991	10/14/1992	08/21/1998	–	–
KYD049062375	National Southwire Aluminum Co.	Hancock		07/29/1991	05/31/1994	09/24/2008	–	10/05/2015
KYD985066380	Newport Dump	Campbell		12/30/1982	09/08/1983	03/28/1988	–	06/03/1996
KY8890008982	Paducah Gaseous Diffusion Plant	McCracken	Groundwater contaminated with VOCs, Technetium-99, and uranium. Uranium, thorium, plutonium, and neptunium have been detected in off-site sediments and surfacewater. TCE and PCBs have been found in site soils.	05/10/1993	05/31/1994	–	–	–
KYD981469794	Red Penn Sanitation Co. Landfill	Oldham		06/24/1988	03/31/1989	09/22/2000	–	09/14/2001
KYD097267413	Smith's Farm	Bullitt		10/15/1984	06/10/1986	09/23/1998	–	–
KYD981028350	Tri-City Disposal Co.	Bullitt		06/24/1988	03/31/1989	03/29/1996	–	–

== See also ==
- List of Superfund sites in the United States
- List of environmental issues
- List of waste types
- TOXMAP
