= Formerly Utilized Sites Remedial Action Program =

US Army Corps of Engineers cleanup project

The Formerly Utilized Sites Remedial Action Program (FUSRAP) is a United States Army Corps of Engineers (USACE) project to manage and cleanup environmental contamination that resulted from early United States Atomic Energy Commission activities. Cleanup activities were initially performed under the supervision of the United States Department of Energy (DOE), until 1997 when the United States Congress passed authority for cleanup activities to the USACE.

The primary source of contamination at the locations stems from the processing of uranium ores and the disposal of the byproducts. The major sources of site contamination are uranium, thorium, and radium. In addition to the radiological contaminants there are semi-volatile organic compounds, volatile organic compounds, and heavy metals comingled at the sites.

== Table of FUSRAP Sites ==
Data from multiple sources

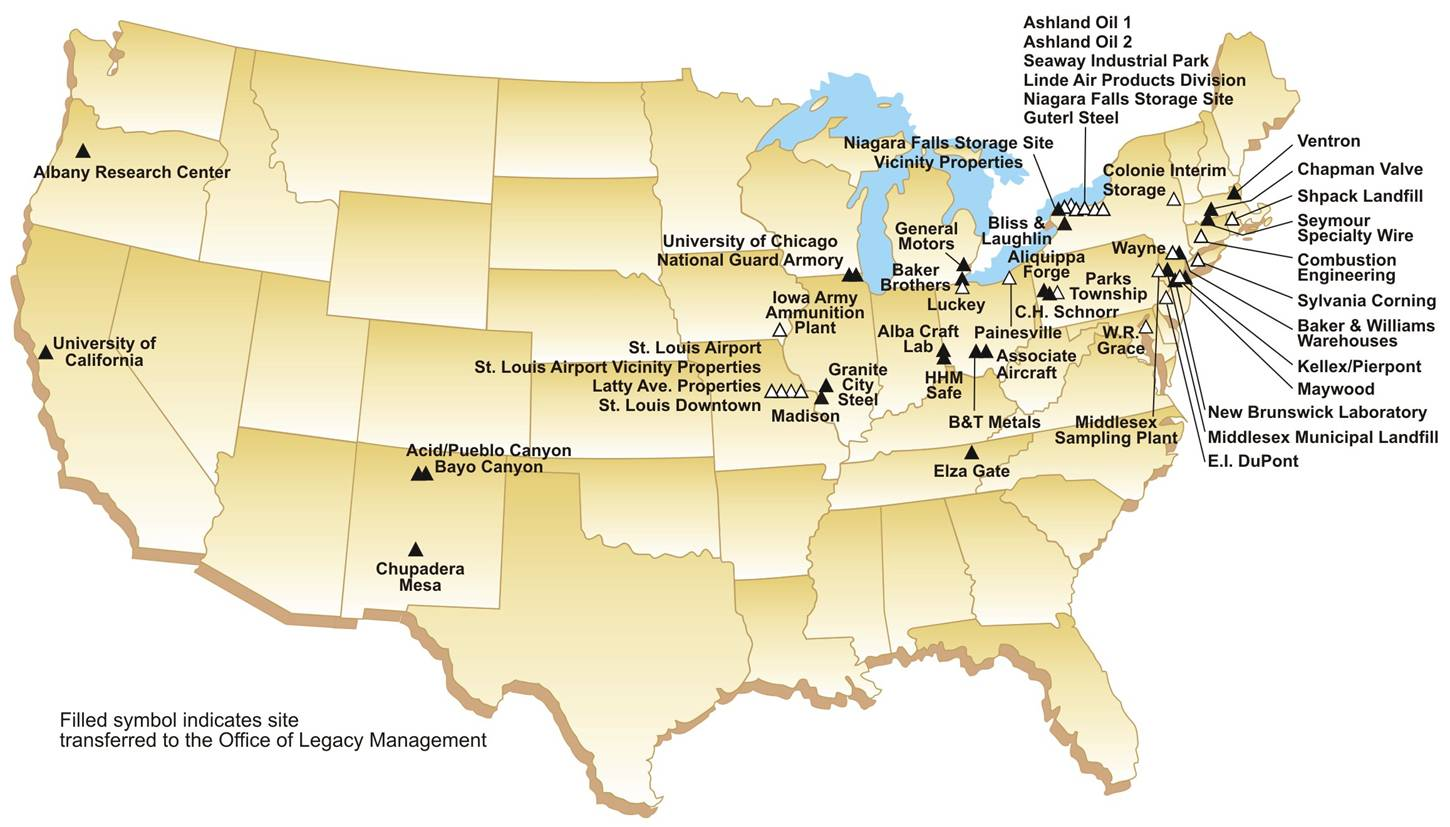
FUSRAP Sites Map

Site Name	City	Vicinity Properties	Waste Volume (m^{3})	Army Corps of Engineer Division/District	URL
Colonie Site	Colonie, New York			North Atlantic Division; New York	HTML link needed
Shpack Landfill	Norton, MA Attleboro, MA			North Atlantic Division; New England	http://www.nrc.gov/info-finder/decommissioning/complex/shpack-landfill.html EPA summary page
Maywood Site	Maywood, New Jersey	83	300,000	North Atlantic Division; New York	http://www.fusrapmaywood.com/projmain.html
Niagara Falls Storage Site	Lewiston, New York	26	157,000	Great Lakes and Ohio River	https://web.archive.org/web/20090115224314/http://www.lrb.usace.army.mil/derpfuds/loow-nfss/index.htm
Guterl Specialty Steel site (former Simonds Saw and Steel)	Lockport, New York	-	-	Great Lakes and Ohio River	https://web.archive.org/web/20110611064948/http://www.lrb.usace.army.mil/fusrap/guterl/guterl-newsletter-2008-03.pdf
Shallow Land Disposal Area (BWX)	Armstrong County, Pennsylvania	-	-	Great Lakes and Ohio River; Pittsburgh District	https://web.archive.org/web/20110927094240/http://www.lrp.usace.army.mil/fusrap/slda.htm
Painesville Site	Painesville, Ohio	-	25,000	Great Lakes and Ohio River Division	https://web.archive.org/web/20110611070253/http://www.lrb.usace.army.mil/fusrap/paine/
Harshaw Chemical Site	Cleveland, Ohio			Great Lakes and Ohio River Division	https://web.archive.org/web/20100524025632/http://www.lrb.usace.army.mil/fusrap/harshaw/
Luckey Site (Brush Wellman Company)	Luckey, Ohio	3	105,000	Great Lakes and Ohio River	https://web.archive.org/web/20071009160357/http://www.lrb.usace.army.mil/fusrap/luckey/
St. Louis Airport Site(SLAPS)	St. Louis, Missouri	78	191,000	Mississippi Division; St. Louis District	https://web.archive.org/web/20090712034102/http://www.mvs.usace.army.mil/eng-con/expertise/fusrap-slaps.html
St. Louis Downtown Site (Mallinckrodt)	St. Louis, Missouri	6	188,000	Mississippi Division; St. Louis District	https://web.archive.org/web/20090710004159/http://www.mvs.usace.army.mil/eng-con/expertise/fusrap-slds.html
Iowa Army Ammunition Plant	Middletown, Iowa	-	-	Mississippi Division; St. Louis District	https://web.archive.org/web/20090629091603/http://www.mvs.usace.army.mil/eng-con/expertise/fusrap-IAAAP.html
Latty Avenue Properties	Hazelwood, Missouri	6	161,000	Mississippi Division; St. Louis District	https://web.archive.org/web/20090711213414/http://www.mvs.usace.army.mil/eng-con/expertise/fusrap-hiss.html
Madison Properties	Madison, IL	-	-	Mississippi Division; St. Louis District	https://web.archive.org/web/20090711212720/http://www.mvs.usace.army.mil/eng-con/expertise/fusrap-madison.html
DuPont Chambers Works	Deepwater, New Jersey	-	-	Philadelphia District	https://www.nap.usace.army.mil/Missions/FUSRAP/DuPontChambersWorks.aspx
