= Maxey Flats =

Radioactive waste dump site in Kentucky

Maxey Flats Low-Level Radioactive Waste facility
- Superfund site
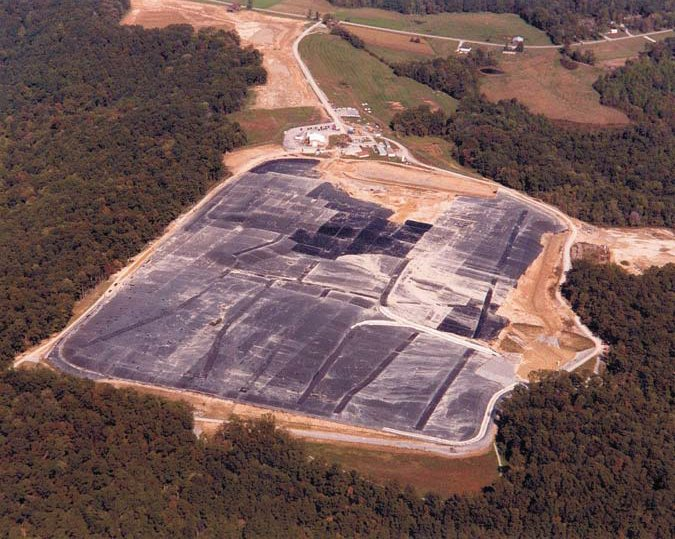
- Aerial view of the Maxey Flats Disposal Site.

- Location within Kentucky
- Location: Hillsboro, Fleming County, Kentucky; 38°15′30″N 83°34′10″W

Information
- CERCLIS ID: KYD980729107
- Contaminants: Heavy metals, radioactive compounds, VOCs, pesticides, and PAHs
- Responsible parties: 50 "de maximis" parties 306 "de minimis" parties

Progress
- Proposed: October 15, 1984
- Listed: June 10, 1986

The Maxey Flats radioactive waste (LLRW) disposal site is a Superfund site in Kentucky which served as a disposal site for low-level nuclear waste from 1963 to 1977. Investigations by the Environmental Protection Agency, among others, determined that plutonium stored at the site had migrated beyond the site's trenches, and the site was closed in 1977.

== Location ==
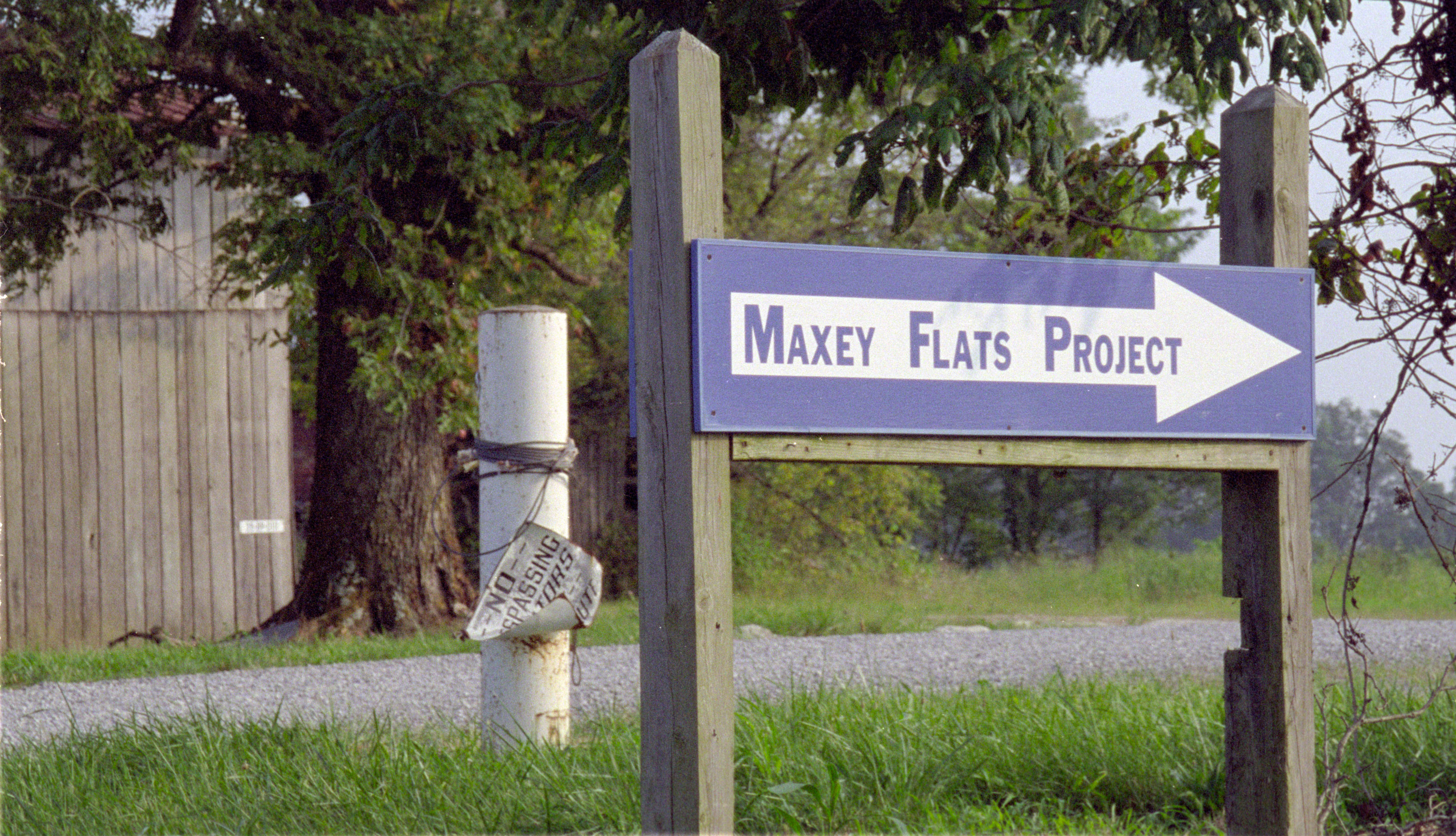
The entrance to the Maxey Flats Low-Level Radioactive Waste site in Maxey Flat, Kentucky, USA. Taken in 2003 before the sign was removed by Homeland Security.

The Maxey Flats disposal site is located on a plateau in northeastern Kentucky, approximately 9 miles (14 km) northwest of Morehead. It is part of Fleming County. Residents refer to the area as "Maxey Flat," while the radioactive waste disposal site is called "Maxey Flats."

== History ==
As part of a program to encourage the nuclear industry in Kentucky, the Kentucky General Assembly created the Division of Nuclear Information. In 1960 the Kentucky General Assembly passed legislation granting the governor power to enter into agreement with the federal government for the transfer of regulatory powers concerning atomic energy in Kentucky. Also in 1960, Governor Bert T. Combs charged the Cabinet of Health with the regulatory and licensing responsibilities for the handling of radioactive materials. In 1962 Kentucky became the first of the old Atomic Energy Commission "Agreement States." The Kentucky Division of Nuclear Information was then succeeded by the Division of Atomic Development which then transferred its responsibilities to the Kentucky Atomic Energy Authority which eventually became the Kentucky Science and Technology Commission. In retrospect it seems that many of these agencies were established with the hope of bringing a nuclear power plant to Kentucky. Despite being the first state to enter into agreement with the Atomic Energy Commission, Kentucky has never been the site of a nuclear reactor. However, in 1962, Nuclear Engineering Company, Inc. (NECO) bought 252 acres (1.02 km^{2}) of land on Maxey Flats and submitted an application for a license to bury radioactive waste there. The license was granted in January 1963.

From 1963 to 1977 the Maxey Flats facility served as a dump site for low-level nuclear waste. The EPA identified 832 parties as potentially responsible for the site's contamination. The site covered 252 acres (1.02 km^{2}) and consisted of a series of 52 unlined trenches that are an average of 360 feet (110 m) long, 70 feet (21 m) wide and 20 feet (6.1 m) deep. Approximately 4,750,000 cubic feet (135,000 m^{3}) of low-level radioactive waste was deposited onsite. These trenches were capped with shale and clay when they reached their capacity. Over time, the caps' structures collapsed and the trenches filled with water. This has been referred to as the "bathtub effect." The water became radioactive and had to be disposed of. Under the direction of President and Chief Executive Officer James N. Neel, Nuclear Engineering Company (referred to in operational documentation as 'NECO'), now known as 'American Ecology' (Nasdaq: ECOL), installed an evaporator and disposed of the accumulated radioactive water as steam from 1973 to April 1986, nearly 9 years after the site had stopped accepting waste materials. The evaporator generally operated 24 hours a day. Approximately six million gallons of liquid were processed by the evaporator. In addition to the trenches for low-level radioactive waste, there were "Hot Wells" that were used to store special nuclear material (plutonium and enriched uranium). The Hot Wells were typically 10 to 15 feet (4.6 m) deep, constructed of concrete, coated steel pipe or tile, and capped with a slab of concrete. Approximately 950 pounds of Special Nuclear Material is buried at Maxey Flats.

On September 27, 1982, the Kentucky New Era reported that the Maxey Flats disposal site was being closed due to "radioactive leakage". Although no immediate health hazard was reported, "the potential [was] still there". State Natural Resources Coordinator Jackie Swigart confirmed that radioactive material had escaped burial trenches and been detected beyond the borders of the 250-acre site. The geology of the Maxey Flats area may contribute to the inadvertent spread of radioactive materials beyond the site's boundaries underground. In 1986, the EPA designated the site as a Superfund site.

From 1987 to 1991 a study was done to determine the best method of cleaning up the site. Extensive remediation was then undertaken, including the installation of a 45 mil scrim-reinforced geomembrane liner covering the site of the trenches to prevent the infiltration of water. The site is currently managed by the Environmental and Public Protection Cabinet of the Commonwealth of Kentucky. The site is considered non-reclaimable and will have to be monitored and maintained in perpetuity. In 2003 the site's nature as a risk to national security came under review by the Department of Homeland Security, primarily because of the transuranic isotopes stored at the site.

In response to concerns that the radioactive isotopes at the site might be used against American interests, DHS had the sign at the entrance to the facility removed so it would be harder to find.

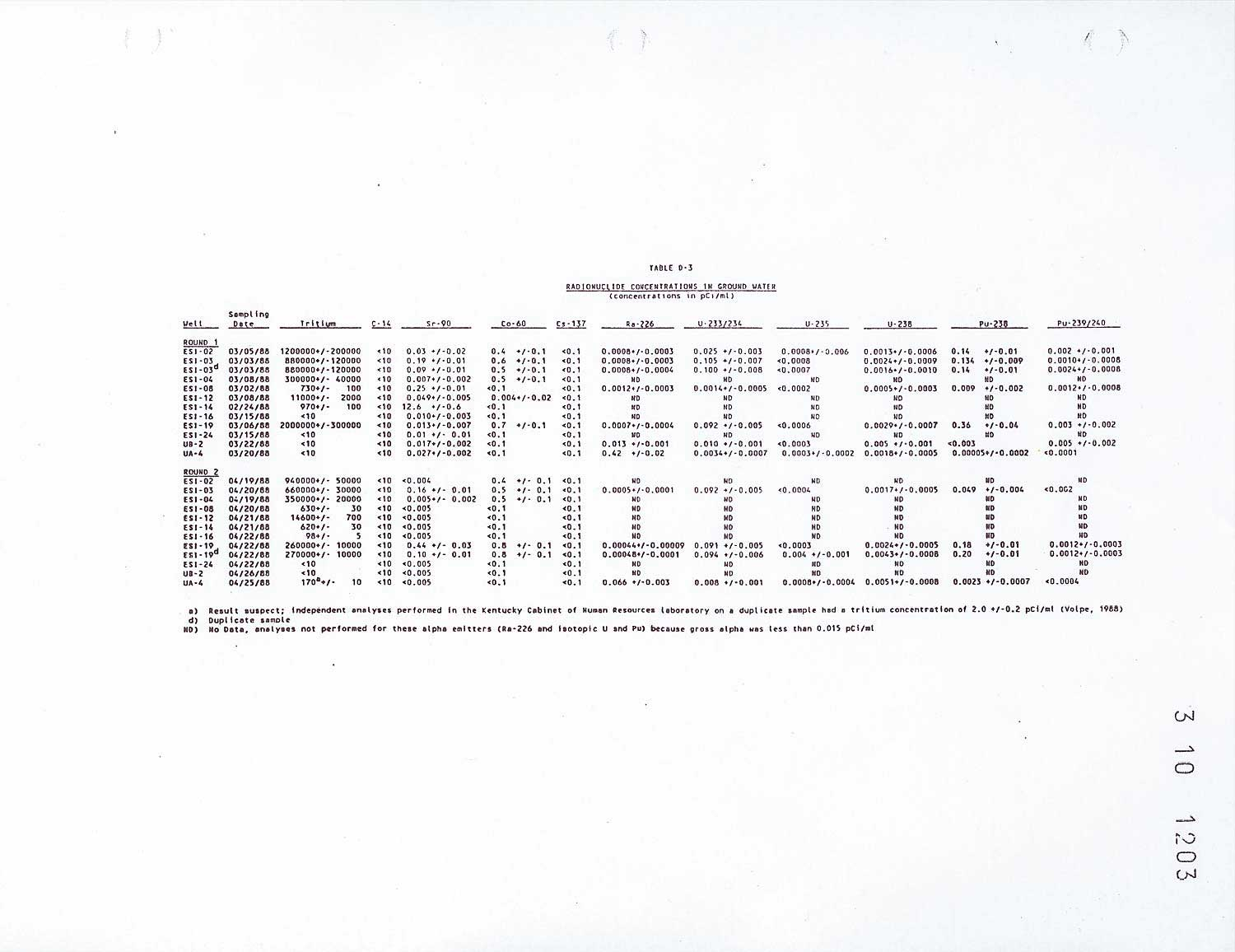
Maxey Flats ground water contamination data from 1988

== In popular culture ==
- The Maxey Flats low-level radioactive waste disposal site is the subject of the documentary film American Threnody.

== See also ==
- List of Superfund sites in Kentucky
