= Juniper Ridge Landfill =

Landfill in Maine, U.S.

- Country: United States
- Location: Old Town, Maine
- Coordinates: 44°58′44″N 68°43′22″W
- Status: Operational
- Owner: State of Maine
- Operator: Casella Waste Systems
- Site area: 179 acres

External links
- Website: www.casella.com/locations/juniper-ridge-me-landfill

Juniper Ridge Landfill (JRL) is a landfill owned by the state of Maine and operated by Casella Waste Systems. It is located in West Old Town, Maine, in the Penobscot River watershed between Pushaw Stream and Birch Stream, which both flow into the Penobscot River north of the Penobscot Indian Island Reservation. JRL consists of approximately 179 acres (72 hectares) of which 68 acres (28 hectares) are filled.

== Description ==
Juniper Ridge Landfill is a landfill owned by the state of Maine and operated by Casella Waste Systems. Owned by Casella Waste Systems.

== History ==
In 1989, the Maine Legislature banned new commercial solid waste disposal facilities and placed responsibility for providing future disposal capacity on the State itself. In 2003, the Legislature directed the State to acquire the Juniper Ridge Landfill in Old Town, Maine.

The landfill had been originally permitted for the disposal of pulp and paper-making wastes from Georgia-Pacific's West Old Town paper mill, as well as to burn pile ash from the City of Old Town transfer station. Following its acquisition by the state of Maine, Juniper Ridge began accepting construction and demolition debris originating from both inside or outside the State of Maine, as well as Maine-originated waste ash from incinerators and boilers, municipal solid waste from waste-to-energy facilities, and certain special wastes.

On January 13, 2020, landfill oversight group Don't Waste ME and the Penobscot Indian Nation delivered petitions to the Department of Environmental Protection requiring the agency to initiate rule-making to prohibit the Juniper Ridge landfill from accepting out-of-state waste. On September 17, 2020, the department's Board of Environmental Protection held a virtual public hearing on the petition. In 2023, some officials supported a two-year prohibition on the landfill accepting out-of-state waste, although others opposed the ban.

In March 2023, collection of sludge at the landfill were paused due to the instability.

In May 2023, firefighters extinguished a blaze at the landfill. A fire official said that determining the fire's cause would be unlikely.
