= Eastlake Landfill =

Landfill in California, U.S.

Coordinates: 38°57′15″N 122°36′03″W

Eastlake Landfill is a Class III landfill located in Clearlake, California.

== Description ==
Eastlake Landfill is a canyon fill which has been operating since 1972. It covers 32 acres, and is owned and operated by the Lake County Public Services department. As demand for the facility surged following fire cleanup and general population growth through the mid-2010s, a plan was approved to expand the landfill in 2014. The expansion is expected to be complete by 2024.
