= Nine Dragons Paper Holdings Limited =

Paper manufacturing company in Mainland China

Nine Dragons Paper Holdings 玖龙纸业控股
- Type: Public
- Traded as: SEHK: 2689
- Industry: Papermaking
- Founded: (1994)
- Headquarters: Hong Kong, China
- Area served: China, United States and Vietnam
- Key people: Mrs. Zhang Yin, (Chairwoman)
- Products: Containerboard, Printing / Writing Paper
- Revenue: ▲US$ 2.7 Billion (2010)
- Net income: ▲US$ 333.4 Million (2010)
- Subsidiaries: ND Paper
- Website: ndpaper.com/

Nine Dragons Paper (Holdings) Limited, operating as ND Paper in the United States (SEHK: 2689) is a publicly listed paper manufacturing company in Mainland China, engaging in the manufacturing of containerboard products which include linerboard, duplex board as well as pulp. Its CEO and largest shareholder is Mrs. Zhang Yin.

The company was established in 1995 and is the largest paperboard producer in Asia and one of the largest in the world in terms of production capacity. It has 9 factories in China and Vietnam. It also owns four paper and pulp mills along with a corrugated box plant in the United States, which are part of the US subsidiary, ND Paper.

Nine Dragons Paper was listed on the Main Board of the Hong Kong Stock Exchange on 3 March 2006.

== History ==
Since commencing production in 1998 with a 200,000 tonnes kraftliner machine, Nine Dragons has expanded to producing over 13 million tonnes of paper products globally.

While many mills globally use forest products for paper production, Nine Dragons primarily uses recycled paper as the raw material source. The company recycles over 10 million tonnes of fiber annually.

Today, the company employs over 15,000 employees globally with 9 manufacturing hubs. Notably, the company's Dongguan facility is the world's largest concentrated paper mill with 15 paper machines producing 5.25 million tonnes of products. Many of Nine Dragons' facilities are also supported with in-house power plants, ports, and trucking. The company has power capacity of over 1,400 MW at various production facilities combined.

The corporate office for U.S. operations is in Oak Brook, Illinois.

The company operates Biron Mill, the Rumford Mill, and operated the Old Town paper mill from 2018 until 2023.
