= Casella Waste Systems =

American waste management company

Casella Waste Systems, Inc.
- Type: Public
- Traded as: Nasdaq: CWST (Class A); Russell 2000 component; S&P 600 component
- Industry: Waste management
- Founded: 1975; 51 years ago
- Founder: Douglas Casella
- Headquarters: Rutland, Vermont, United States
- Key people: John W. Casella (CEO); Ned R. Coletta (president & CFO); Shelley Sayward (SVP, general counsel)
- Revenue: ▲US$1.84 billion (2025)
- Net income: ▼US$7.87 million (2025)
- Number of employees: 4,000
- Website: www.casella.com

Casella Waste Systems, Inc. is a waste management company based in Rutland, Vermont, United States. Founded in 1975 with a single truck, Casella is a regional, vertically integrated solid waste services company. Casella provides resource management expertise and services to residential, commercial, municipal and industrial customers, primarily in the areas of solid waste collection and disposal, transfer, recycling and organics services. The company provides integrated solid waste services in seven northeastern states: Vermont, New Hampshire, New York, Massachusetts, Connecticut, Maine and Pennsylvania, with its headquarters located in Rutland, Vermont. Casella manages solid waste operations on a geographic basis through two regional operating segments, the Eastern and Western regions, each of which provides a full range of solid waste services, and larger-scale recycling and commodity brokerage operations. Organics services, major account and industrial services, are also provided.

Casella Waste Systems has 5,600 employees. Revenues were $1.837 billion for fiscal year 2025, up $279.6 million, or up 18.0%, from fiscal year 2024.

Casella has a Diesel Technician Training program as well as a CDL training school. The Diesel Tech program is currently in Williston, Vermont, and the CDL program is in West Rutland, Vermont.

== Expansion ==
Beginning in 2018, Casella resumed its growth platform. Casella would acquire several businesses in 2018 including six solid waste collection businesses and one transfer business in its Western region and two businesses consisting of solid waste collection and transfer operations in the Eastern region.

As of January 31, 2019, Casella owned and/or operated 37 solid waste collection operations, 49 transfer stations, 18 recycling facilities, eight Subtitle D landfills, four landfill gas-to-energy facilities and one landfill permitted to accept construction and demolition ("C&D") materials.

On July 26, 2021, Casella purchased Willimantic Waste Paper Co. Inc., based out of Willimantic, CT. It was Casella's fifth acquisition in 2021.

In early April 2023, Casella Waste Systems, Inc. announced the signing of an equity purchase agreement to acquire collection, transfer, and recycling operations in Pennsylvania, Delaware, and Maryland from GFL Environmental Inc. (“GFL”) for a purchase price of $525 million. The proposed acquisition includes nine hauling operations, one transfer station, and one material recovery facility with aggregate annualized revenues of approximately $185 million.

In September 2023, Casella acquired the collection, transfer, and recycling assets from Consolidated Waste Services LLC and Twin Bridges for $219 million. Casella acquired a transfer station, two hauling operations, and a material recovery facility in the deal.

== Conflict and Controversy ==
Casella has a history of legal conflict, including complaints over leachate handling in Bethlehem, NH and Southbridge, MA, numerous violations of the New York State Environmental Conservation Law from 2015 to 2022, damage to wetlands in Southbridge, MA, anti-competitive service contracts, occupational health and safety violations, and operating a landfill without a permit.
