= Clearlake, California =

City in California, United States

- City
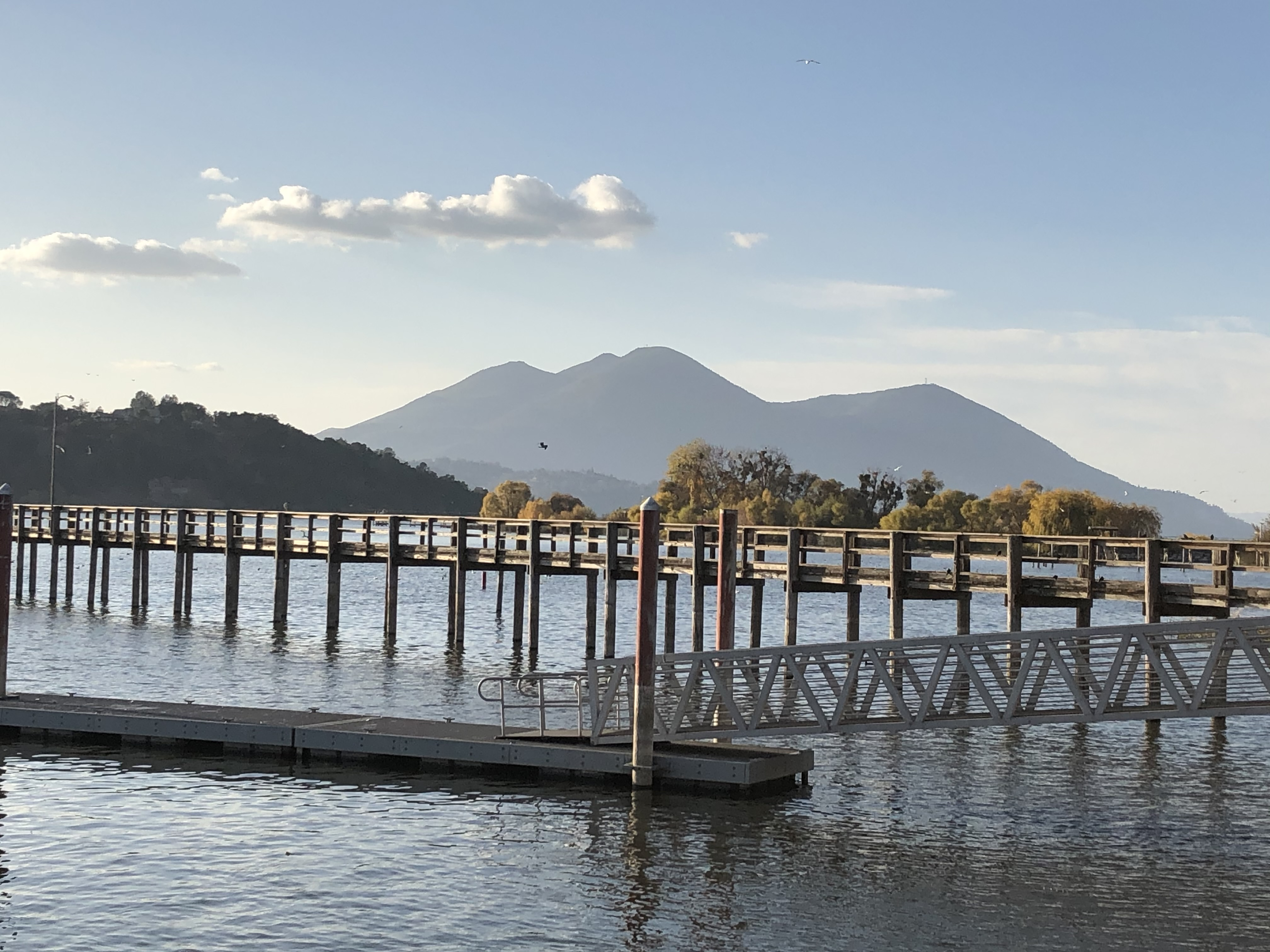
- Redbud Park

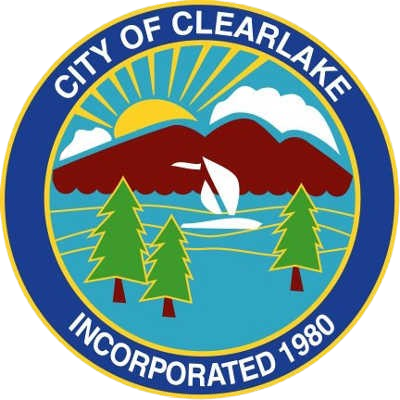
- Seal
- Motto: "On the shores of beautiful Clear Lake"
- Interactive map of Clearlake, California
- Coordinates: 38°57′30″N 122°37′35″W
- Country: United States
- State: California
- County: Lake
- Incorporated (city): November 14, 1980
- Named after: Clear Lake

Government
  - Type: Council–manager government
  - Mayor: Dirk Slooten
  - City manager: Alan Flora

Area
  - Total: 10.58 sq mi (27.40 km^{2})
  - Land: 10.13 sq mi (26.24 km^{2})
  - Water: 0.45 sq mi (1.17 km^{2}) 4.27%
- Elevation: 1,417 ft (432 m)

Population (2020)
  - Total: 16,685
  - Density: 1,647.2/sq mi (635.98/km^{2})
- Time zone: UTC-8 (Pacific (PST))
  - Summer (DST): UTC-7 (PDT)
- ZIP code: 95422
- Area code: 707, 369
- FIPS code: 06-13945
- GNIS feature IDs: 1657240, 2409479
- Website: Official city website

Clearlake is a city in Lake County, California, United States. Clearlake is 4.5 miles (7.2 km) north-northwest of Lower Lake, at an elevation of 1,417 feet (432 m). As of the 2020 census, the city had a total population of 16,685, up from 15,250 in the 2010 census. It takes its name from Clear Lake.

== History ==
The Clearlake post office opened in 1923, under the name of "Konocti" then the name was changed to Clearlake Highlands until the town's incorporation in 1981 when the official name became City of Clearlake.

The first inhabitants of Clearlake were the Pomo Indians, who named many of the area's features, including Mount Konocti. Beginning in 1821, enslavement and mistreatment by Spanish soldiers and missionaries, Mexican land barons, European settlers, and gold diggers, combined with a lack of natural immunity to European diseases, resulted in a massive wave of deaths. The result of this was massive amounts of land freed up for the white settlers who arrived during the gold rush.

== Geography ==
Clearlake is located at 38°57'30" North, 122°37'35" West.

According to the United States Census Bureau, the city has a total area of 10.6 square miles (27 km^{2}), of which 10.1 square miles (26 km^{2}) is land and 0.5 square miles (1.3 km^{2}) is water. The total area is 4.27% water.

== Climate ==
Clearlake has a hot-summer Mediterranean climate (Köppen: Csa) with hot, dry summers and cool, wet winters. Diurnal temperature variation is high, especially in the summer. Snowfall is rare.

Climate data for Clearlake, California (1991–2020 normals, extremes 1911–present)
Month	Jan	Feb	Mar	Apr	May	Jun	Jul	Aug	Sep	Oct	Nov	Dec	Year
Record high °F (°C)	80 (27)	81 (27)	86 (30)	94 (34)	101 (38)	114 (46)	113 (45)	112 (44)	111 (44)	100 (38)	92 (33)	79 (26)	114 (46)
Mean maximum °F (°C)	68.5 (20.3)	72.4 (22.4)	77.0 (25.0)	84.6 (29.2)	89.5 (31.9)	99.6 (37.6)	102.1 (38.9)	101.1 (38.4)	98.5 (36.9)	91.0 (32.8)	78.2 (25.7)	67.8 (19.9)	104.2 (40.1)
Mean daily maximum °F (°C)	54.8 (12.7)	57.7 (14.3)	61.6 (16.4)	66.4 (19.1)	72.5 (22.5)	83.2 (28.4)	91.4 (33.0)	90.5 (32.5)	85.4 (29.7)	75.4 (24.1)	63.4 (17.4)	54.8 (12.7)	71.4 (21.9)
Daily mean °F (°C)	43.2 (6.2)	45.2 (7.3)	48.5 (9.2)	52.8 (11.6)	58.8 (14.9)	67.3 (19.6)	73.6 (23.1)	72.4 (22.4)	67.4 (19.7)	58.8 (14.9)	49.0 (9.4)	43.2 (6.2)	56.7 (13.7)
Mean daily minimum °F (°C)	31.6 (−0.2)	32.7 (0.4)	35.4 (1.9)	39.3 (4.1)	45.0 (7.2)	51.5 (10.8)	55.9 (13.3)	54.3 (12.4)	49.3 (9.6)	42.2 (5.7)	34.6 (1.4)	31.6 (−0.2)	42.0 (5.5)
Mean minimum °F (°C)	22.8 (−5.1)	24.7 (−4.1)	28.5 (−1.9)	31.1 (−0.5)	37.7 (3.2)	43.6 (6.4)	49.2 (9.6)	48.2 (9.0)	42.5 (5.8)	33.9 (1.1)	25.7 (−3.5)	22.3 (−5.4)	19.4 (−7.0)
Record low °F (°C)	9 (−13)	13 (−11)	17 (−8)	23 (−5)	21 (−6)	34 (1)	39 (4)	37 (3)	27 (−3)	24 (−4)	16 (−9)	6 (−14)	6 (−14)
Average precipitation inches (mm)	6.19 (157)	6.15 (156)	3.99 (101)	1.99 (51)	1.16 (29)	0.23 (5.8)	0.01 (0.25)	0.09 (2.3)	0.17 (4.3)	0.91 (23)	2.89 (73)	6.08 (154)	29.86 (758)
Average snowfall inches (cm)	0.2 (0.51)	0.1 (0.25)	0.1 (0.25)	0.0 (0.0)	0.0 (0.0)	0.0 (0.0)	0.0 (0.0)	0.0 (0.0)	0.0 (0.0)	0.0 (0.0)	0.0 (0.0)	0.0 (0.0)	0.4 (1.0)
Average precipitation days (≥ 0.01 in)	13.6	12.7	10.3	8.1	5.4	1.7	0.2	0.2	0.6	4.0	9.2	12.6	78.6
Average snowy days (≥ 0.1 in)	0.2	0.1	0.1	0.0	0.0	0.0	0.0	0.0	0.0	0.0	0.0	0.0	0.4
Source: NOAA

== Demographics ==
Historical population
Census	Pop.	Note	%±
1990	11,804		—
2000	13,142		11.3%
2010	15,250		16.0%
2020	16,685		9.4%
U.S. Decennial Census

=== 2020 census ===
As of the 2020 census, Clearlake had a population of 16,685 and a population density of 1,647.3 inhabitants per square mile (636.0/km^{2}).

The age distribution was 25.3% under the age of 18, 7.6% aged 18 to 24, 25.2% aged 25 to 44, 24.8% aged 45 to 64, and 17.1% who were 65 years of age or older. The median age was 37.5 years. For every 100 females, there were 103.0 males. For every 100 females age 18 and over, there were 101.0 males age 18 and over.

The census reported that 99.4% of the population lived in households, 0.2% lived in non-institutionalized group quarters, and 0.5% were institutionalized. There were 6,366 households, out of which 31.9% included children under the age of 18. Of all households, 31.0% were married-couple households, 10.0% were cohabiting couple households, 32.0% had a female householder with no spouse or partner present, and 27.0% had a male householder with no spouse or partner present. 31.8% of households were one person, and 15.3% were one person aged 65 or older. The average household size was 2.6. There were 3,762 families (59.1% of all households).

There were 7,665 housing units at an average density of 756.7 units per square mile (292.2 units/km^{2}), of which 6,366 (83.1%) were occupied. Of these, 54.6% were owner-occupied, and 45.4% were occupied by renters. 16.9% of housing units were vacant. The homeowner vacancy rate was 2.5%, and the rental vacancy rate was 5.4%.

97.0% of residents lived in urban areas, while 3.0% lived in rural areas.

Racial composition as of the 2020 census
Race	Number	Percent
White	9,895	59.3%
Black or African American	570	3.4%
American Indian and Alaska Native	448	2.7%
Asian	170	1.0%
Native Hawaiian and Other Pacific Islander	30	0.2%
Some other race	3,129	18.8%
Two or more races	2,443	14.6%
Hispanic or Latino (of any race)	5,406	32.4%

=== 2023 estimate ===
In 2023, the US Census Bureau estimated that the median household income was $41,580, and the per capita income was $19,944. About 17.6% of families and 25.4% of the population were below the poverty line.

=== 2010 census ===
At the 2010 census, Clearlake had a population of 15,250. The population density was 1,441.3 inhabitants per square mile (556.5/km^{2}). The racial makeup of Clearlake was 11,262 (73.8%) White, 614 (4.0%) African American, 400 (2.6%) Native American, 161 (1.1%) Asian, 27 (0.2%) Pacific Islander, 1,805 (11.8%) from other races, and 981 (6.4%) from two or more races. Hispanic or Latino of any race were 3,248 persons (21.3%).

The census reported that 14,790 people (97.0% of the population) lived in households, 366 (2.4%) lived in non-institutionalized group quarters, and 94 (0.6%) were institutionalized.

There were 5,970 households, 1,859 (31.1%) had children under the age of 18 living in them, 1,957 (32.8%) were opposite-sex married couples living together, 1,013 (17.0%) had a female householder with no husband present, 448 (7.5%) had a male householder with no wife present. There were 650 (10.9%) unmarried opposite-sex partnerships, and 71 (1.2%) same-sex married couples or partnerships. 1,898 households (31.8%) were one person and 739 (12.4%) had someone living alone who was 65 or older. The average household size was 2.48. There were 3,418 families (57.3% of households); the average family size was 3.11.

The age distribution was 3,656 people (24.0%) under the age of 18, 1,528 people (10.0%) aged 18 to 24, 3,384 people (22.2%) aged 25 to 44, 4,389 people (28.8%) aged 45 to 64, and 2,293 people (15.0%) who were 65 or older. The median age was 39.9 years. For every 100 females, there were 99.9 males. For every 100 females age 18 and over, there were 96.6 males.

There were 8,035 housing units at an average density of 759.4 per square mile (293.2/km^{2}), of which 3,190 (39.7) were owner-occupied, 2,780 (34.6%) were occupied by renters and 2065 (25.7%) were vacant. The homeowner vacancy rate was 5.9%; the rental vacancy rate was 12.1%. 7,595 people (49.8% of the population) lived in owner-occupied housing units and 7,195 people (47.2%) lived in rental housing units.

== Government ==
In the state legislature, Clearlake is in the 2nd senatorial district, represented by Democrat Mike McGuire, and in the 4th Assembly district, represented by Democrat Cecilia Aguiar-Curry.

Federally, Clearlake is in California's 4th congressional district, represented by Democrat Mike Thompson.

== Infrastructure ==
According to a 2012 road report, approximately 44% of the city's roads are unpaved, including dozens of miles of urban residential streets.

== Notable people ==
- Michael Berryman, actor
- Randy Hennis, baseball player, was born in Clearlake

== See also ==
- Eastlake Landfill
