= Hercules 009 Landfill =

Landfill site

- Superfund site
- Location within Georgia
- Location: Brunswick, Glynn County, Georgia; 31°12′18″N 81°29′09″W

Information
- CERCLIS ID: GAD980556906
- Contaminants: Toxaphene, benzene, TCE, toluene, xylenes, dioxin, pesticides, arsenic, chromium, lead
- Responsible parties: Hercules Inc.

Progress
- Proposed: September 8, 1983
- Listed: September 21, 1984
- Construction completed: September 24, 1999

The Hercules 009 Landfill Superfund site is a 16.5-acre (67,000 m^{2}) property that is bordered by Georgia State Route 25 (Spur 25) on the west; an automobile dealership on the north; a juvenile slash pine forest on the east; and several homes, a church, a school, and a strip shopping center to the south/southeast of the property. Hercules Inc. was issued a permit in 1975 by the GaEPD to use 7 acres (28,000 m^{2}) at the northern end of the property as a landfill to dispose of toxaphene-contaminated wastewater sludge generated during the manufacturing processes. The 009 Landfill was constructed at the northern end of the property as six cells, each approximately 100 to 200 feet (61 m) wide (north-south direction) and 400 feet (120 m) long (west-east direction). Toxaphene has been detected at levels exceeding 15,000 parts per million at the Hercules 009 Landfill Site.

== Cleanup Progress: Actual Construction Underway ==
In 1984, the landfill was placed on the National Priorities List (NPL). GAEPD began negotiations with Hercules to perform an RI/FS and initiated Site investigation activities under State Superfund authority, then withdrew as lead agency in 1987 before negotiations were completed. The United States Environmental Protection Agency (EPA) assumed primary control of the investigation and related activities at the end of 1987. In July 1988, Hercules and EPA entered into an Administrative Order on Consent for conducting the RI/FS.

Under the Site, groundwater flows towards several private drinking water wells. In recognition of this potential threat, in 1991 EPA initiated an interim action (in the form of an operable unit) to connect the affected residences to Brunswick's municipal water supply. All water connections were completed by December 1992. In the summer 1992, EPA discovered relatively low levels of toxaphene in the front yards of the residences adjacent to the Site. The residents were temporarily relocated while their yards were excavated and then backfilled with clean fill. The contaminated soil from the residential area was stockpiled on Hercules' property and later stabilized with the rest of the 009 Landfill.

In 1993, EPA enumerated the final remedy for the Site in a Record of Decision (ROD). The areas to be remediated included the sludge contained in the landfill cells, the soils in the sludge-staging area on the Hercules property, and the Benedict Road/Nix Lane area outside the Hercules property. The remedy selected in the ROD includes the stabilization of subsurface soils and consolidated surface soils which the PRP is designing and constructing. In addition, surface water in the adjacent drainage ditch and groundwater under the Site will be monitored for toxaphene. The remedial design for this remedy was finalized in early 1998 and construction activities were completed in March 1999. EPA approved the construction completion report in September 1999. The 2nd Five Year Review was completed in June 2006. Post monitoring results indicate a successful and effective remedy.

== See also ==
- Landfill in the United States
- List of Superfund sites in Georgia
