= Glen Lily Landfill =

Solid waste landfill in Kentucky

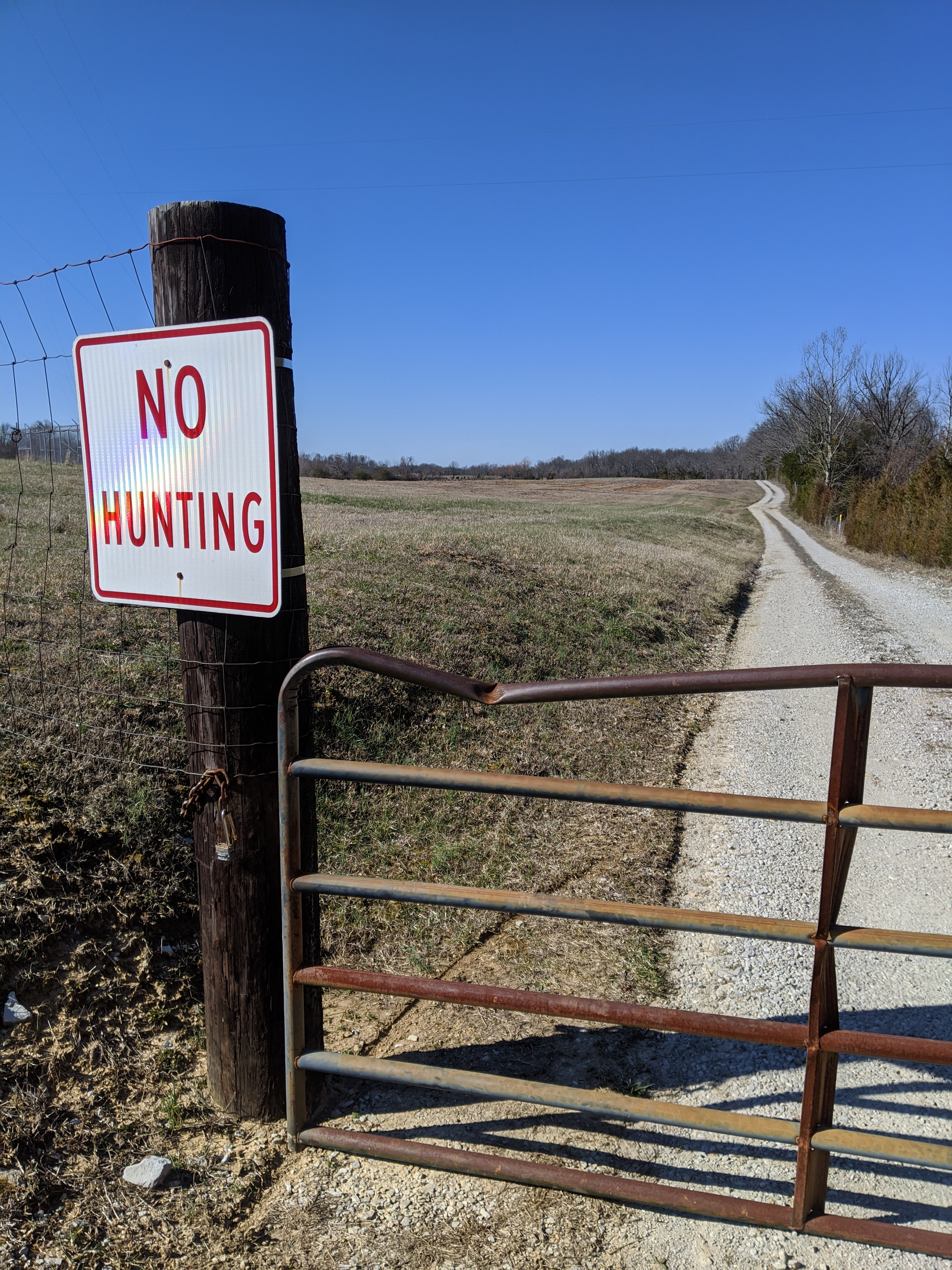
- Entrance to the Glen Lily Landfill site

- Location within Kentucky
- Alternative names: Glen Lily Road Landfill, Bowling Green Old Landfill, Curtis Peay Landfill, PowerPlex Park

General information
- Location: 5301 Glen Lily Road, Bowling Green, KY 42101
- Coordinates: 37.036067°N 86.533315°W
- Elevation: 750 ft (229 m)
- Owner: City of Bowling Green
- Superfund site
- Location: Warren County, Kentucky

Information
- CERCLIS ID: KYD981019839
- Responsible parties: City of Bowling Green

Progress

The Glen Lily Landfill is an inactive municipal solid waste landfill located in unincorporated Warren County, Kentucky, northwest of the city of Bowling Green. The landfill accepted residential and industrial waste from 1975 to 1979; after being idled, carcinogenic pollutants were found to be leaching into nearby groundwater. Remediation of the facility was administered as a Superfund site by the state of Kentucky.

== Name ==
While in operation the landfill was known as Curtis Peay Landfill. As of 2020, it is most often referred to as Glen Lily Landfill in City of Bowling Green documents. In media reports, it is often cited as Glen Lily Road Landfill, and in some United States Environmental Protection Agency documentation it is known simply as Bowling Green Old Landfill.

== History ==
In late 1974, the City of Bowling Green purchased two parcels of land in a rural, unincorporated area of Warren County for the purposes of creating a landfill to be used by the city's municipal garbage collection program. The land, situated near the intersection of Glen Lily Road and Price Chapel Road was zoned for agriculture. Opposition from local residents concerned over traffic on Glen Lily Road resulted in garbage deliveries taking a more circuitous route along Morgantown Road and Price Chapel Road. The landfill was placed atop a hill over a karst feature. Later dye studies showed that the landfill property sits atop two groundwater drainage basins: one flowing to the east towards Barren River, and another, on the land primarily under the landfill, flowing to the west towards Westbrook Creek, a tributary of Gasper River. The landfill, reported to cover 30 acres of the 270-acre site, opened for operation in 1975 and accepted both residential and industrial waste.

The landfill was full by 1979 and was idled by the City of Bowling Green which had opened a new landfill in an abandoned strip mine in nearby Butler County. As early as 1979 it was noted that the landfill had accepted waste drums without examining their contents. In 1981, the landfill joined Kentucky's priority list of Superfund sites.

In September 1985, a state inspection determined that the landfill contained pollutants and ordered the City of Bowling Green to remediate the site. in 1986, six chemicals, including carcinogens, were found to be leaching from the site into nearby groundwater. The chemical phenol was among the pollutants identified.

in 1989, eight test wells were drilled to monitor the site. Twenty-one organic pollutants on a Federal priority list were found at that time. An additional two organic pollutants not on the list were also identified. That same year, the Kentucky Cabinet of Natural Resources refused a request from the City of Bowling Green to pay for remediation; however, the Cabinet agreed with the city's plan to attempt to identify customers responsible for disposing of toxins which ended up at the site. Eventually the City identified thirty-one potential polluters. As late as 1989, the city was applying a deodorant to cover the smell of decaying garbage in the landfill. Also in 1989, the City instituted a surcharge on garbage collection bills to pay for landfill remediation which by 1990 were estimated at $3 million. The city expected to be monitoring the site until 2019.

At some point the landfill was capped with a clay cap which was found to be insufficient. By 1992, the initial cap had been replaced with an impermeable plastic membrane which itself was covered by a clay cap. The city also installed a system to collect landfill leachate into three concrete storage tanks which are monitored and drained as needed. The collected leachate is removed from the site and treated by a contractor. In 1997, responsibility for the site was transferred from the state back to the city.

At some point in the 1990s, escaping methane gas produced as a result of decomposition of organic materials in the landfill resulted in a fire. In order to better control the escaping gasses, 128 passive gas vents were installed at the site. Another fire of unknown origin erupted near the landfill's methane vents in March 2007. This grass and brush fire required all nine of Warren County's volunteer fire departments to respond. In 2008, the city received a proposal that escaping methane be captured for commercial use.

in 2010, it was noticed that the leachate tanks were filling faster than expected. A study found that stormwater retention basins at the site had not been properly lined and were leaking into the leachate tanks. A $446.790 project extended the lining to eliminate most of the stormwater seepage significantly reducing the frequency at which the tanks needed to be drained. The City paid for the project upfront but believed it could be reimbursed by state funds. Stormwater, which is not required to be treated, continues to be discharged from six points along the landfill into unnamed tributaries of Westbrook Creek. Groundwater monitoring was eliminated in 2010, and stormwater monitoring was reduced in 2015.

In 1991, the City borrowed nearly $3 million to create a Landfill Closure Special Revenue Fund to fund maintenance of both the Glen Lily and Butler County landfills. As of 2010, $1.36 million remained in the fund and the city expected to be responsible for both landfills until 2034. The cost of landfill maintenance was a primary reason for the city to exit the municipal garbage service.

== PowerPlex Park ==
On January 7, 2020, the Bowling Green City Commission voted to approve a lease of the landfill property to organizers of a powersports event to be held May 16–17, 2020. The $3,000 lease is for the two day May event with access before and after the event for preparation and cleanup to be allowed at the city's discretion; however, it was reported that the organizers were working with the city to permanently acquire the landfill property from the city for a nominal fee and convert into a racing facility known as PowerPlex Park which organizers touted as a "Disneyland of motorsports." Organizers plan to build multiple race courses and permanent structures at the site to accommodate 20,000 event attendees. On March 2, 2020, local residents held a public meeting to discuss the proposed use for the landfill; many attendees expressed concerns with event noise, the state of transportation infrastructure in the area, and the environmental impact of the facility. Residents also expressed concerns at the March 3, 2020 meeting of the Bowling Green City Commission. As of March 2020, no vote on the proposed deal to transfer the land to event organizers has been scheduled.

== Other uses ==
The landfill site also hosts a communications tower used by the City of Bowling Green, and the site continues to be used by the city as a dump site for storm debris. Notably, portions of the site were used as a dump site for debris from the 2021 Bowling Green tornadoes.

== See also ==
- List of Superfund sites in Kentucky
- Landfills in the United States
