= Agriculture Street Landfill =

Dump in New Orleans, Louisiana, US

- Superfund site
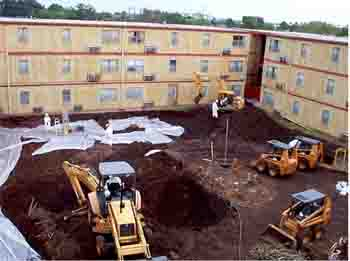

- Location within Louisiana
- Location: New Orleans, Louisiana; 29°59′20″N 90°2′31″W

Information
- CERCLIS ID: LAD981056997
- Contaminants: Lead, arsenic, and PAHs

Progress
- Proposed: August 23, 1994
- Listed: December 16, 1994
- Construction completed: April 2, 2002
- Partially deleted: June 15, 2000

The Agriculture Street Landfill was a dump located in the Desire Area of New Orleans, Louisiana. The area was later developed for residential use, with unfortunate environmental consequences. It became a Superfund cleanup site in 1994.

== History ==
=== A city dump ===
This area in the Upper Ninth Ward of New Orleans was swampy low ground when it began to be used as a dump in 1909. The landfill became one of the area's main dumps for both residential and industrial waste. It often caught fire, with flames and smoke visible for a good distance away, and got the local nickname Dante's Inferno. The dump was first closed in 1952, but continued as a sanitary landfill site until the end of the decade. It reopened in the aftermath of Hurricane Betsy, and much of the debris from that storm was deposited on site. It was officially reclosed in 1966, although reports indicate that dumping continued for another year. The landfill site was then covered with ash from city incinerators and compacted by bulldozers.

=== Redevelopment ===
Starting in 1978, the old dump site was covered with sand and soil and then redeveloped as a residential neighborhood, with 67 single-family homes, 225 townhouses (majority public housing), a 128-unit apartment complex, Moton Elementary School, and a small shopping plaza. Three residential developments - Press Park (the townhouses), Gordon Plaza (the single-family homes), and Liberty Terrace (the apartment building) - were built over the old landfill area.

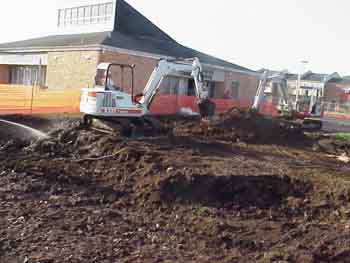
EPA excavation during cleanup of the landfill site.

The redevelopment project was championed by then mayor Dutch Morial as an opportunity for low-income African-Americans to qualify for home ownership. Along with the City of New Orleans led by Morial, additional sponsors of the redevelopment project included former U.S. Representative William J. Jefferson, New Orleans City Councilman Johnny Jackson, the Housing Authority of New Orleans, the New Orleans school board, and HUD.

=== Problems ===
Complaints of trash working its way up to the surface and health problems by area residents first prompted Environmental Protection Agency investigations in 1986. The area was initially judged not worthy of federal remedy and no further remedial action was planned by the EPA. In 1991, the US Centers for Disease Control revised the national levels for lead in blood from 25 ugm/DL to 10 ugm/DL, prompting new concern for environmental lead exposure. Residents continued finding old trash just below the surface when trying to plant gardens or erect fences, and anecdotal evidence of health problems including abnormally high rates of cancer became common (though the ATSDR found, in September 1997, that statistically higher breast cancer rates in the area were not related to the site). People in the area petitioned for retesting in 1993, and the site was placed on the National Priorities List as a cleanup site the following year. Investigations showed that the actual amount of soil placed over the landfill before redevelopment was much thinner than had been claimed.

=== Remedial work ===
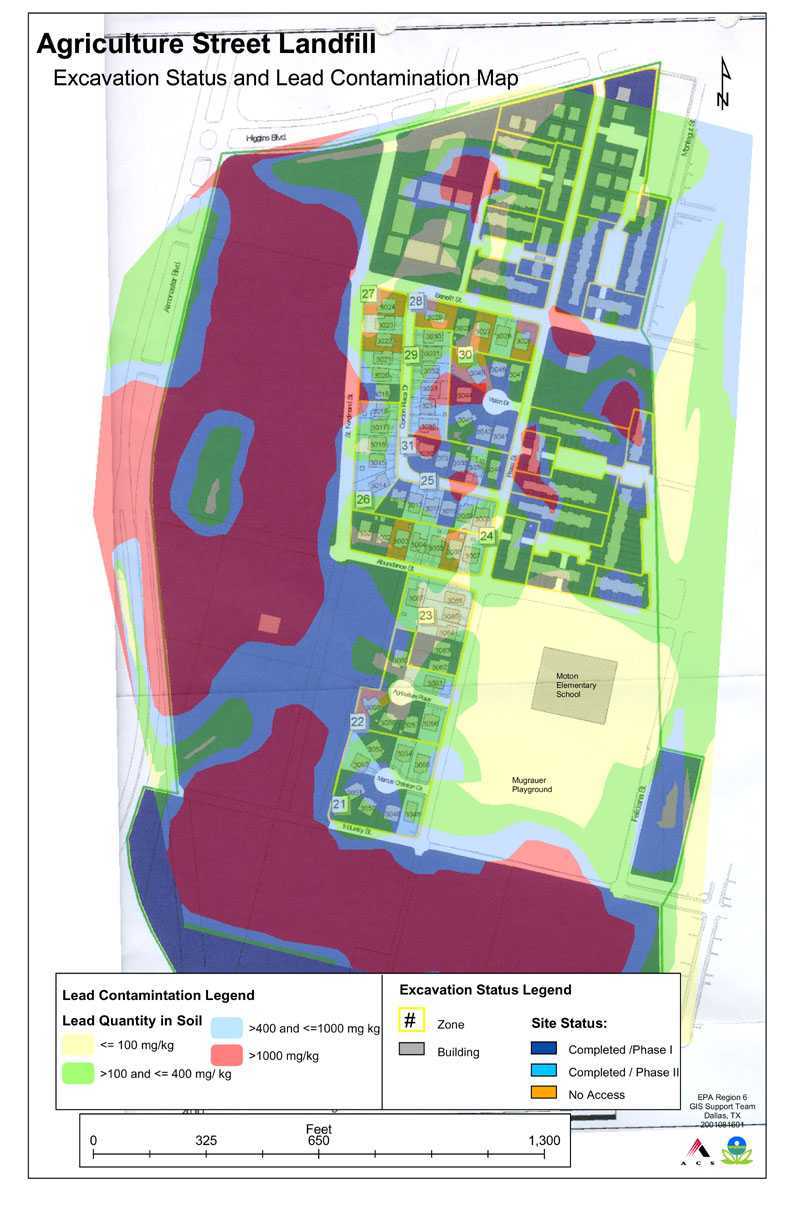
An EPA map detailing lead contamination at the landfill site.

EPA supervised cleanup included closing Moton Elementary, and on residential land removing two feet of soil, putting down a geotextile barrier, then topping it with two feet of new clean soil. In April 2001 it was announced to be 99% complete. Many area homeowners and residents have petitioned for being moved elsewhere, with the backing of Congressman Bill Jefferson, but they have not succeeded in getting funds provided.

=== After Hurricane Katrina ===
Flooding in the aftermath of Hurricane Katrina disrupted this area (see: Effect of Hurricane Katrina on New Orleans), with storm surge funneled by the Mississippi River-Gulf Outlet Canal flooding into this neighborhood in 2005. There are concerns that the flooding has released additional toxins in the area. "Press Park", a 56 townhouse housing complex in the area, has been found contaminated with benzopyrene at levels some 50 times EPA health screening level, and remains fenced off as of April 2010. In March 2018, the Orleans Parish School Board was ordered by civil district judge Tiffany Chase to pay a $12 million dollar judgment to 1,433 former students of Moton Elementary School. This was the equivalent of $1,000 per year each student spent at the school, plus interest.

== See also ==
- List of Superfund sites in Louisiana
- Landfill in the United States
