= Charles-George Reclamation Trust Landfill =

Hazardous waste site in Massachusetts, US

- Superfund site
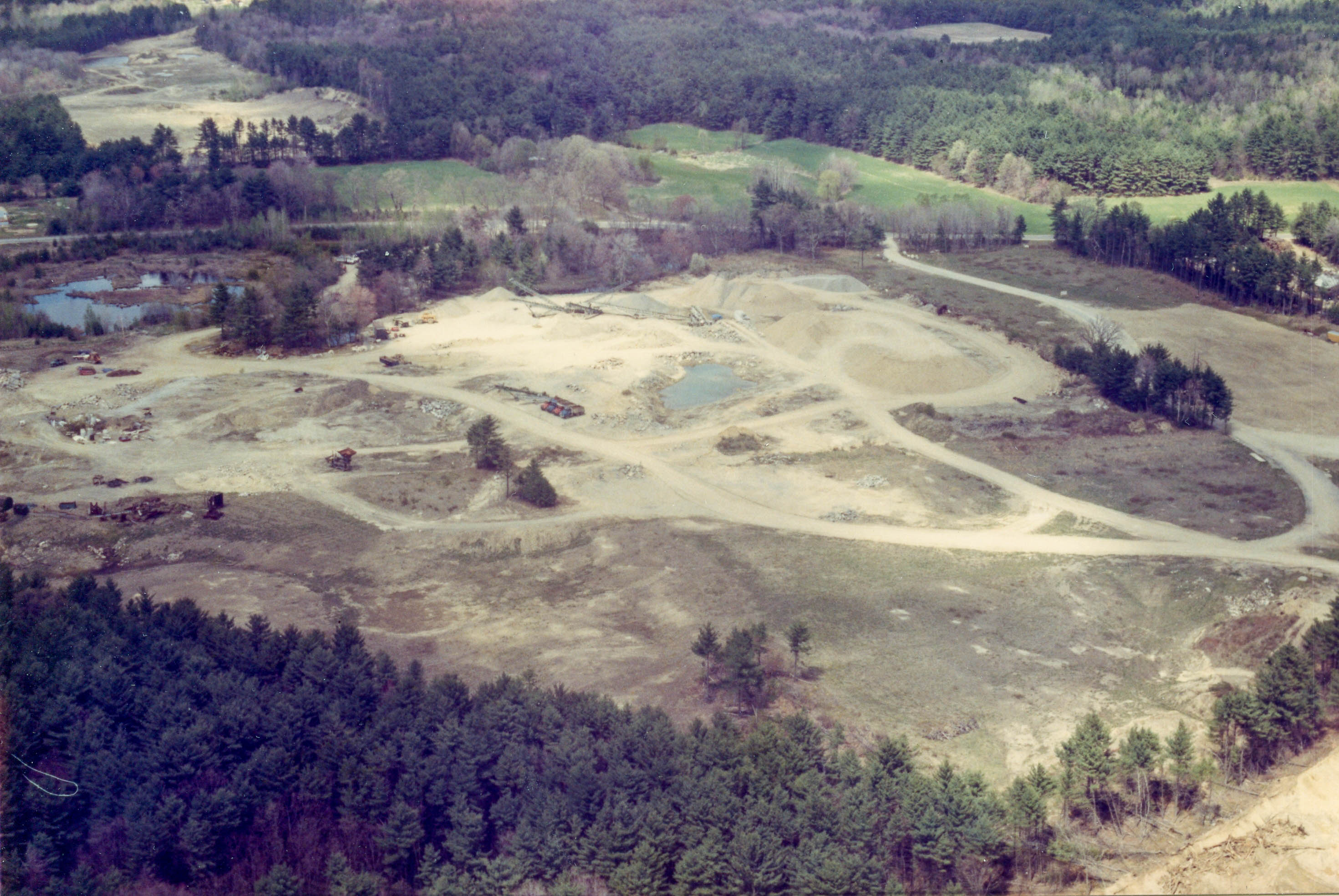
- Aerial view of the landfill in May 1986 taken by the Massachusetts Department of Environmental Protection

- Location within Massachusetts Location within the United States
- Location: Tyngsborough, Middlesex, Massachusetts; 42°39′57″N 71°26′45″W

Information
- CERCLIS ID: MAD003809266
- Contaminants: Benzene, tetrahydrofuran, arsenic, 1,4-dioxane, and 2-butanone
- Responsible parties: Dorothy George and Charles George

Progress
- Proposed: October 23, 1981
- Listed: September 8, 1983
- Construction completed: September 25, 1998

The Charles-George Reclamation Trust Landfill is a hazardous waste site located in the town of Tyngsborough, Massachusetts, which is part of the Environmental Protection Agency's Superfund program. It is now the site of a 2.6 MW solar farm.

== Geography ==
The 19-acre (7.7 ha) site is located one mile (1.6 km) from the center of Tyngsborough near the Dunstable border. Additionally, the landfill is bordered by a 16-acre (6.5 ha) marsh and 61-acre (25 ha) pond to the east, dubbed Flint Pond Marsh and Flint Pond respectively as well as the Dunstable Brook to the west.

== History ==
Originally a landfill serving local communities in the 1950s and 1960s, the landfill was expanded in 1967 to accept both household and industrial waste, and from 1973 to 1976 to accept hazardous waste. During the period of hazardous waste acceptance, the site accumulated a large quantity of volatile organic compounds and metal slugs. In 1981, the site was assessed to have the fourth largest amount of hazardous waste in the New England area out of 302 New England landfills assessed. Upon further assessment it was found that over 1,000 pounds (450 kg) of mercury was disposed of and 2,500 cubic yards (1,900 m^{3}) of chemical wastes were deposited in the landfill. It was found that the contaminants had leaked into the groundwater and contaminated nearby wells at the Cannongate Condominium. In 1983 contaminants had been found in the wells of households neighboring the condominium. Following the sites state-ordered closure in 1983 to 1998 the site was subjected to clean up by the Environmental Protection Agency which included the creation of a permanent water supply for residents, the migration of contaminants, and the capping of the landfill. In 2017, construction was completed of a 2.6 MW solar farm consisting of 10,000 panels and constructed by the Citizens Energy Corporation.

== Environmental damage ==
In addition to groundwater contamination, Flint Pond has also suffered contamination due to its proximity to the site. Several species of fish and eels were found to have increased levels of mercury and arsenic in their bodies.

== Litigation ==
In 2003, the site's former owners, Dorothy George and Charles George, settled all claims against them for $3.8 million. The trustees later paid the Massachusetts Division of Fish and Wildlife $1.2 million in 2004 and $625,000 in 2007 to establish conservation land in the towns of Tyngsborough and neighboring Dunstable.
