= Zhang Yin (entrepreneur) =

Chinese businesswoman (born 1957)

Zhang Yin (Cheung Yan)
- 张茵
- Born: Zhang Xiuhua; 1957 (age 68–69); Shaoguan, Guangdong, China
- Other name: Queen of Trash
- Title: Founder and director of Nine Dragons Paper Holdings
- Spouse: Liu Ming Chung (second husband)
- Children: 2

Zhang Yin (Chinese: 张茵; born 1957), also known as Cheung Yan, is a Chinese businesswoman and one of the richest people in greater China. As of 2013, she ranked as the fourth richest woman in Mainland China, and 24th richest overall, according to the Hurun Report China Rich List 2013. She is the founder and director of the family company Nine Dragons Paper Holdings Limited, a recycling company that buys scrap paper from the United States, imports it into China, and mainly turns it into cardboard for use in boxes to export Chinese goods. The company is China's biggest paper maker.

In January 2007, it was reported that Zhang was also a member of the Chinese People's Political Consultative Conference, a political advisory body for the Chinese government.

== Early life ==
Zhang Yin was born Zhang Xiuhua in 1957 in Shaoguan, Guangdong, with family roots in Heilongjiang. She was the eldest of eight children. She later changed her name to the more contemporary Yin.

Zhang's father, Zhang De En, was a lieutenant in the Red Army, but was jailed for three years during the Cultural Revolution for rightist activity. Because of her father's imprisonment, Zhang never went to college and began working at a young age to support her family. His contacts and connections within the Communist Party would help along her business career.

== Career ==
After working as a bookkeeper in a Guangdong textile factory and attending trade school for accounting, Yin moved to Shenzhen to manage the accounting and trading departments of a paper trading company at the time that the city was becoming the special economic zone and export hub it is today.

There she learned of opportunities in Hong Kong's wastepaper trade with China from a paper-mill contact in Liaoning. Zhang was encouraged to enter the sector, and in 1985, at age twenty-eight, Zhang Yin successfully opened the paper trading company Ying Gang Shen in Hong Kong (a convenient source of raw materials in the form of wastepaper) using her savings of $3,800.

However, paper quality for recyclable paper in China was poor, and in 1990, she moved to Los Angeles in search of better resources and founded the company America Chung Nam with her second husband, Liu Ming Chung. This company has been the number one American paper exporter since 2001, and the largest overall exporter of freight to China from the United States, by volume shipped.

Zhang Yin returned to Hong Kong in 1995 to expand her business into the packaging sector and cofounded Nine Dragons Paper Holdings Limited with her husband and her younger brother Zhang Cheng Fei.

The company, headquartered in Dongguan, raised almost $500 million in an initial public offering in March 2006 at the Hong Kong Stock Exchange; by the end of 2006 the stock had nearly tripled in value. The firm invested $800 million and more than doubled production capacity by 2009, becoming Asia's first and then the world's largest maker of packaging paper. The firm entered 2011 with revenues of US$3.8 billion, 17,000 employees and the capacity to produce thirteen million tons of containerboard and packaging materials per year.

Zhang Yin makes most of the strategic decisions, her husband is CEO, her brother handles general management. Her son Lau Chun is a nonexecutive director. The company has three general managers who are responsible for all aspects of the business; none are family members.

== Controversy ==
In the March 2008 Chinese People's Political Consultative Conference annual meeting, Zhang proposed "tax reforms that would include a tax cut of one-third for the nation's wealthiest citizens, lower duties on imported environmental equipment, and... from a new labor law designed to protect low-paid factory workers." Public and media response to her proposals was highly critical, and controversy regarding Zhang's "'pro-rich' agenda" ensued.

On April 15, 2008, SACOM released its investigation of Nine Dragons, accusing the company of unethical labor practices, and made public the "Nine Dragons Paper Employee Handbook", which contained multiple rules, featuring worker fines in particular, that came under massive criticism. Nine Dragons has since ceased worker fines, but Zhang herself personally maintains that the company's actions were morally sound.

Labor strikes against Nine Dragons also occurred in December 2007 in response to Zhang's labor law proposal, and in summer of 2008, protesting large employee layoffs.

== Awards ==
In October 2006, she became, at the age of 49, the first woman to top the list of richest people in China published by the Hurun Report. In 2010 Zhang's personal fortune was valued at approximately US$4.6 billion, making her the wealthiest self-made woman in the world, ahead of Oprah Winfrey, J.K. Rowling, Giuliana Benetton, Meg Whitman, and Rosalia Mera. Forbes magazine put her wealth at US$1.35 billion in November 2006, which would have made her then the richest woman in China and the fifth richest person in China. (On a later Forbes list she was displaced as China's richest woman by 25-year-old Yang Huiyan)

In June 2014, Zhang was named Asian CEO of the Year for 2014 at RISI's 15th annual Asian Pulp and Paper Conference.

As of July 2016 Forbes estimates her wealth to be US$1.12 B, the #384 richest person in China (down from #216 in 2014), and the #1724 richest person in the world.

== Personal life ==
Zhang's first marriage resulted in one child and a divorce. She met her second husband, Liu Ming Chung, in Hong Kong and the couple married shortly after moving to America. Liu was born in Taiwan, grew up in Brazil and was trained as a dental surgeon, a career path he left in order to pursue the paper business with his wife.

Zhang has two children, both of whom live and study in the United States. Her older son Lau Chun Shun is a non-executive director of Nine Dragons, and Zhang has stated that her children's inheritance of the company would depend on their objective capabilities.

She is a follower of Buddhism.

Zhang Yin holds a US green card.
