= List of Superfund sites in Michigan =

This is a list of Superfund sites in Michigan designated under the Comprehensive Environmental Response, Compensation, and Liability Act (CERCLA) environmental law. The CERCLA federal law of 1980 authorized the United States Environmental Protection Agency (EPA) to create a list of polluted locations requiring a long-term response to clean up hazardous material contaminations. These locations are known as Superfund sites, and are placed on the National Priorities List (NPL).

The NPL guides the EPA in "determining which sites warrant further investigation" for environmental remediation. As of June 2021, there were 65 active Superfund sites on the National Priorities List in Michigan. Two additional sites are currently proposed for entry on the list. Seventeen sites have been cleaned up and removed from the list.

== Superfund sites ==
Proposed for addition to National Priorities List
Deleted from National Priorities List
Not on National Priorities List

CERCLIS ID	Name	County	Reason	Proposed	Listed	Construction completed	Partially deleted	Deleted
MID006028062	Rockwell International Corp. (Allegan)	Allegan	Ground water on the site is contaminated with lead, arsenic, cyanide, and 4-methyl-2-pentanone. Private wells downgradient of the plant are contaminated with heavy metals and cyanide. Surface and subsurface soils, groundwater, and sediments in the lagoons and Kalamazoo River were contaminated with VOCs, semi-VOCs, pesticides, PCBs, heavy metals, and polynuclear aromatic hydrocarbons.	April 10, 1985	July 22, 1987	September 27, 2016	–	–
MID980794440	Ossineke Ground Water Contamination	Alpena	Groundwater under the site contains petroleum-related volatile organic compounds, including benzene, xylene, trichloroethylene, and chloroform.	December 30, 1982	September 8, 1983	September 30, 2002	–	January 31, 1996
MID980794655	Tar Lake	Antrim		December 30, 1982	September 8, 1983	September 28, 2004	November 21, 2005	–
MID981092935	Bay City Middlegrounds	Bay		February 13, 1995	–	–	–	–
MID980992952	Metal Working Shop	Benzie		January 22, 1987	February 21, 1990	June 30, 1992	–	December 23, 1992
MI0001119106	Aircraft Components (D & L Sales)	Berrien		October 2, 1995	June 17, 1996	August 24, 2004	–	–
MID005107222	Bendix Corp./Allied Automotive	Berrien		June 24, 1988	February 21, 1990	December 3, 2001	–	–
MID005068143	Electro-Voice	Berrien	Lagoons and the dry well area soils contained volatile organic compounds, semi-VOCs and metals.	December 30, 1982	September 21, 1984	September 21, 1999	–	–
MID005480900	North Bronson Industrial Area	Branch	Volatile organic compounds, heavy metals, polychlorinated biphenyls, and cyanide	October 15, 1984	June 10, 1986	–	–	–
MID980504450	Albion-Sheridan Township Landfill	Calhoun	Various organic chemicals and heavy metals	June 24, 1988	October 4, 1989	September 28, 1999	–	–
MID005339676	McGraw Edison Corp.	Calhoun	Groundwater, stream sediments, surface water, and soils are contaminated with TCE	December 30, 1982	September 8, 1983	January 28, 1998	–	–
MID980793806	Verona Well Field	Calhoun	Volatile organic compounds including benzene, trichloroethylene, and tetrachoroethylene	December 30, 1982	September 8, 1983	June 26, 1997	–	–
MID980794556	U.S. Aviex	Cass	Groundwater and soil are contaminated with volatile organic compounds.	December 30, 1982	September 8, 1983	September 21, 1993	–	–
MID980794390	Charlevoix Municipal Well	Charlevoix						
MID980678627	Cannelton Industries, Inc.	Chippewa						
MID980002273	Clare Water Supply	Clare						
MID980476907	Parsons Chemical Works, Inc.	Eaton						
MID006013049	Petoskey Municipal Well Field	Emmet						
MID000605717	Berlin & Farro	Genesee						
MID980410740	Forest Waste Products	Genesee						
MI0001091214	Union Lake Radiation Site	Oakland	Union Lake is the site of radioactive contamination produced by David Hahn in 1995.	–	–	–	–	–
MID980791461	Avenue "E" Ground Water Contamination	Grand Traverse						
MID980794531	Gratiot County Golf Course	Gratiot		December 30, 1982	December 30, 1982	September 8, 1983	–	September 8, 1983
MIN000510389	Velsicol Burn Pit	Gratiot		September 23, 2009	March 4, 2010	–	–	–
MID980506281	Gratiot County Landfill	Gratiot		December 30, 1982	September 8, 1983	July 19, 1995	–	–
MID000722439	Velsicol Chemical Corporation (Michigan)	Gratiot		December 30, 1982	September 8, 1983	September 25, 1992	–	–
MID980901946	Torch Lake	Houghton	PCBs and mercury in fish tissue. Cupric ammonium carbonate and copper tailings in water.	October 15, 1984	June 10, 1986	September 23, 2005	April 8, 2002 & March 29, 2004	–
MID006522791	Adam's Plating	Ingham						
MID017188673	Barrels, Inc.	Ingham						
MID980702989	Motor Wheel, Inc.	Ingham						
MID006029102	American Anodco, Inc.	Ionia						
MI0001271535	H & K Sales	Ionia						
MID980794416	Ionia City Landfill	Ionia						
MID980794408	Hedblum Industries	Iosco						
MI5570024278	Wurtsmith Air Force Base	Iosco	Groundwater contaminated with metals, polycyclic aromatic hydrocarbons, volatile organic compounds, including trichloroethylene, 1,1-dichloroethane, 1,1,1-trichloroethane, and vinyl chloride.	January 18, 1994	–	–	–	–
MIN000505842	Michner Plating Co.	Jackson	1,100 barrels of chemical waste buried in the building's foundations, PFAS groundwater contamination.	September 8, 2021	March 17, 2022	–	–	–
MID980794382	Auto Ion Chemicals, Inc.	Kalamazoo						
MID980506463	K&L Avenue Landfill	Kalamazoo						
MID000775957	Michigan Disposal (Cork Street Landfill)	Kalamazoo						
MID005340088	Roto-Finish Co., Inc.	Kalamazoo						
MID006007306	Allied Paper/Portage Ck/Kalamazoo River	Kalamazoo and Allegan						
MID062222997	Butterworth Landfill#2	Kent						
MID980477079	Chem Central	Kent						
MID980609366	Folkertsma Refuse	Kent						
MID017075136	H. Brown Co., Inc.	Kent						
MID981089915	Kent City Mobile Home Park	Kent						
MID000260281	Kentwood Landfill	Kent						
MID990858003	Organic Chemicals, Inc.	Kent						
MID000268136	Sparta Landfill	Kent						
MID079300125	Spartan Chemical Co.	Kent						
MID980609341	State Disposal Landfill, Inc.	Kent						
MID980701247	Wash King Laundry	Lake						
MID980506562	Metamora Landfill	Lapeer	Soil and groundwater contain VOCs, ethyl benzene, chloroform, toluene, xylene, polychlorinated biphenyls, and heavy metals including arsenic.	September 8, 1983	September 21, 1984	September 27, 2001	–	–
MID017418559	Grand Traverse Overall Supply Co.	Leelanau						
MID002931228	Anderson Development Co.	Lenawee						
MID095402210	Rasmussen's Dump	Livingston						
MID980794473	Shiawassee River	Livingston		December 30, 1982	September 8, 1983	September 29, 2005	–	–
MID980794481	Spiegelberg Landfill	Livingston						
MID980410823	G&H Landfill	Macomb						
MID067340711	Liquid Disposal, Inc.	Macomb						
MID069826170	South Macomb Disposal (Landfills 9 & 9A)	Macomb						
MIN000510063	Ten-Mile Drain	Macomb		March 4, 2010	September 29, 2010	–	–	–
MID980794747	Packaging Corp. of America	Manistee						
MID980608970	Cliff/Dow Dump	Marquette						
MID980794465	Mason County Landfill	Mason						
MID980994354	Tittabawassee River, Saginaw River and Bay Superfund site	Midland						
MID084566900	Novaco Industries	Monroe						
MID006030373	Bofors Nobel, Inc.	Muskegon						
MID980504716	Duell & Gardner Landfill	Muskegon		December 30, 1982	September 8, 1983	August 10, 2001		September 30, 2019
MID006016703	Kaydon Corp.	Muskegon						
MID072569510	Muskegon Chemical Co.	Muskegon	was contaminated with dichloroethane, bis-(2 chlorophyll)ether, and triglycol dichloride.	June 24, 1988	February 21, 1990	June 26, 1997		
MID060174240	Ott/Story/Cordova Chemical Co.	Muskegon	Groundwater was contaminated with over 90 organic chemicals, including benzene, toluene, vinyl chloride, dichloroethane and tetrachloroethene.	December 30, 1982	September 8, 1983	May 1, 2002		
MID006031348	Peerless Plating Co.	Muskegon						
MID000724930	SCA Independent Landfill	Muskegon						
MID044567162	Thermo-Chem, Inc.	Muskegon						
MID980701254	Whitehall Municipal Wells	Muskegon						
MID980794663	Cemetery Dump	Oakland						
MID005341714	Hi-Mill Manufacturing Co.	Oakland						
MID980609440	J & L Landfill	Oakland						
MID980499842	Rose Township Dump	Oakland						
MID980499966	Springfield Township Dump	Oakland						
MID980608780	Southwest Ottawa County Landfill	Ottawa						
MID060179587	Waste Management of Michigan (Holland)	Ottawa						
MID980703011	Sturgis Municipal Wells	St. Joseph						
MID980410617	Burrows Sanitation	Van Buren						
MID980274179	Carter Industrials, Inc.	Wayne						
MID985574227	Lower Ecorse Creek Dump	Wayne						
MID043681840	Kysor Industrial Corp.	Wexford						
MID020883609	Northernaire Plating	Wexford						

== See also ==
- List of Superfund sites in the United States
- List of environmental issues
- List of waste types
- TOXMAP
