= Thermo-Chem, Inc. =

Superfund site in Michigan, US

- Superfund site
- Location within Michigan
- Location: Egelston Township, Muskegon, Michigan; 43.2125689°N 86.1394934°W

Information
- CERCLIS ID: MID044567162
- Contaminants: trichloroethane, tetrachloroethane, dichloroethane, dichlorobenzene, dichloroethene, methylnaphthalene, methylphenol, acetone, aluminum, arsenic, benzene, bis(2-ethylhexyl) phthalate, carbon tetrachloride, chloroethene, chloroform, chromium, cyanide, ethylbenzene, iron, naphthalene, pentachlorophenol, styrenetoluene, xylene, zinc

Progress

Thermo-Chem, Inc., also referred to as Thermo-Chem, is a 50-acre Superfund site located in Egelston Township near Muskegon, Michigan.

This site was used by Thermo-Chem, Inc. and the Thomas Solvent Company as a waste solvent reprocessing and storage facility. These operations resulted in pollution of groundwater and soil, with high concentrations of volatile, semi-volatile, and inorganic contaminants. Contaminated water seepage from Thermo-Chem contributed to degradation of the adjacent Black Creek Watershed.

Preliminary assessment of the site was completed in August, 1984, and the site was finalized on the National Priorities List in June, 1986. Long-term remediation efforts took place between 1996 and 2000. These efforts included debris removal; contaminated soil excavation, treatment, and removal; groundwater extraction and treatment; and soil vapor extraction. Since remediation, the United States Environmental Protection Agency (EPA) has conducted multiple five-year reviews of the site, with completion of the most recent five-year review in July, 2020. The EPA has estimated the site will be ready for reuse by summer 2022. Continued maintenance and operation activities are ongoing.

Groundwater and soil contaminants determined to be (or to have formerly been) present at the site include:

- 1,1,1-Trichloroethane
- 1,1,2,2-Tetrachloroethane
- 1,1,2-Trichloroethane
- 1,1-Dichloroethane
- 1,1-Dichloroethene
- 1,2-Dichlorobenzene
- 1,2-Dichloroethane
- 2-Methylphenol (o-Cresol)
- 2-Methylnaphthalene
- Acetone
- Aluminum
- Arsenic
- Benzene
- Bis(2-ethylhexyl) phthalate
- Carbon Tetrachloride
- Chloroethene (Vinyl Chloride)
- Chloroform
- Chromium
- Cyanide
- Ethylbenzene
- Iron
- Naphthalene
- Pentachlorophenol
- Styrene
- Tetrachloroethene
- Toluene
- Trans-1,2-Dichloroethene
- Trichloroethene
- Xylene (Mixed Isomers)
- Zinc

== See also ==
- List of Superfund sites in Michigan
