= Brio Superfund site =

Former industrial location in Harris County, Texas

Brio Refining, Inc.
- Superfund site
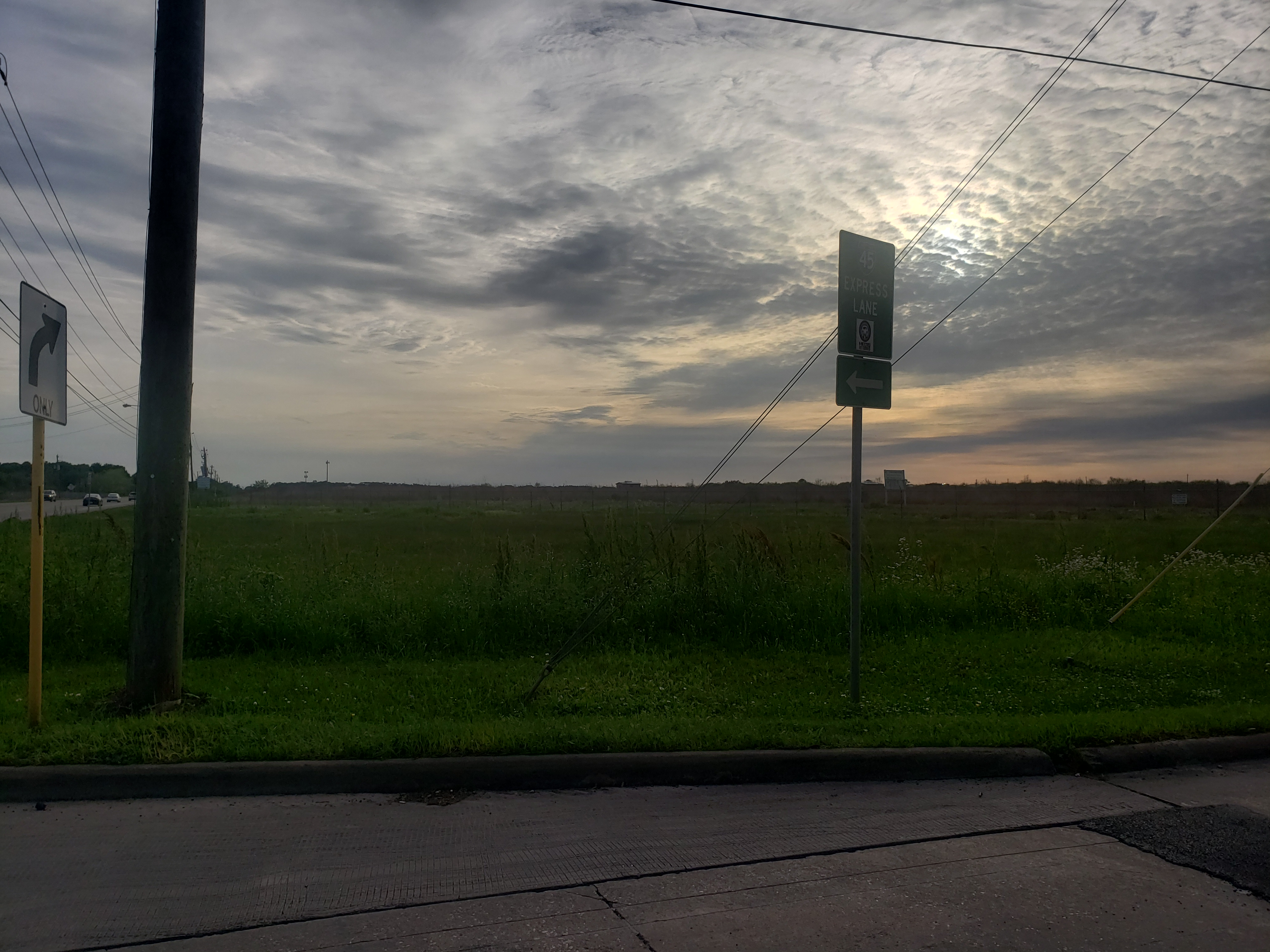
- Brio Superfund site near the intersection of Beamer Road and Dixie Farm Road, the latter road on the image's left, 2019.

- Location within Texas
- Location: Unincorporated area surrounded by the cities of Houston, Pearland, and Friendswood, Harris County, Texas; 29°34′27″N 95°12′33″W

Information
- CERCLIS ID: TXD980625453
- Contaminants: 1,1,2-trichloroethane; 1,2-dichloroethene; 1,1-dichloroethane; 1,2-dichloroethane; 1,1-dichloroethene; vinyl chloride; phenanthrene; fluoranthene; bis(2-chloroethyl) ether
- Responsible parties: Brio Site Task Force

Progress
- Proposed: October 15, 1984
- Listed: March 31, 1989
- Construction completed: April 28, 2004
- Deleted: December 28, 2006

The Brio Superfund site is a former industrial location in Harris County, Texas, at the intersection of Beamer Road and Dixie Farm Road, about 16 miles (26 km) southeast of downtown Houston and adjacent to the Dixie Oil Processors Superfund site. It is a federal Superfund site, although it was deleted from the National Priorities List in December 2006.

== Site history and contamination ==
The 58-acre Brio Refinery site was home to several chemical companies between 1957 and 1982, when the owner, Brio Refinery Inc. declared bankruptcy and ceased operations. During that period, the site had been used for copper recovery and petroleum re-refining, typically the processing of tar, sludge, and other residue from oil tanks and other sources, as also occurred at the adjacent Dixie Oil Processors site. Throughout the years, at both sites, unprocessed petroleum and waste materials were stored in 12 large earthen pits, ranging from 14 to 32 feet deep and extending into porous soil and, thus, groundwater. Leaks from these pits also spilled into a local drainage ditch, Mud Gulley, and subsequently, via the adjoining Clear Creek, into Galveston Bay. By the late 1980s, the EPA had detected copper, vinyl chloride, 1,1,2-trichloroethane, fluorene, styrene, ethylbenzene, toluene, benzene and other toxic chemicals, including numerous chlorinated volatile organic compounds (VOCs), in the air and groundwater.

The EPA placed the Brio site on the National Priorities List in 1984. Beginning in 1989, the EPA began remediation by demolishing buildings, digging out contaminated soils for processing or disposal, containing groundwater by use of a physical barrier, and capping the site. The site was removed from the National Priorities List in 2006.

== Impact on the Southbend neighborhood ==
Although groundwater was contaminated, as noted above, community wells in the adjoining South Bend neighborhood were not contaminated. PulteGroup, which built much of the Southbend community, claimed it was unaware of the problem until 1983, which was after it had built many of the homes, although it has been reported that construction workers complained of health problems while the initial homes were being built. Not long after, residents began reporting health problems. Women in the area had reported an above average rate of miscarriages and there was an increase in upper respiratory ailments, central nervous system disorders, and birth defects (particularly reproductive and heart problems). Some of the residents moved out, fearing for their health and for that of their children. Former residents have since reported various illnesses which include cancer, vasculitis, and autoimmune disease.

To address these health concerns, the Agency for Toxic Substances and Disease Registry (ATSDR), part of the U.S. Department of Health and Human Services, conducted a cross-sectional health outcomes study to compare current residents of the Southbend subdivision with residents of a comparison group. In addition, a separate study of adverse reproductive outcomes of both current and former Southbend residents was initiated. Because of limited participation and the small number of birth defects verified by medical records, analysis of this phase of the study would not have been scientifically valid and the study was terminated.

A report titled "Southbend Subdivision Health Outcomes Study" was issued in August 1995 by the ATSDR. The report delivered three conclusions: "1) Although findings suggest that Southbend participants were less healthy than participants from the comparison area, design limitations and potential biases must be considered. Intense media coverage, litigation, and migration from the Southbend area could have affected the results of this study. None of these associations should be interpreted to imply causality. 2) Population distributions of various biomarker levels analyzed in this study were significantly different between the two populations. The clinical significance of these findings is unknown. 3) The clinical significance and public health implications of isolated findings were difficult to interpret and might have been due to bias or to chance. However, the multiple symptoms reported in excess for the respiratory system are a cause of concern."

In 1992, the Brio Superfund site was the subject of a US$207 million court settlement, which was at the time the largest out-of-court settlement for a toxic waste case.

== Cleanup ==
Razing of the houses (which sold for $70,000 to $90,000 when the subdivision was being built) began on January 2, 1997. Site remediation was originally to be done through an on-site incinerator, but after a significant portion of the incinerator apparatus was built, the plan was scrapped due to community opposition and because many of the pollutants were nonburnable minerals. The South Belt-Ellington Leader, a community newspaper still in publication as of February 2025, was known for publishing details of the Brio Superfund site and being a key opponent to on-site incineration.

The EPA determined that full remediation was infeasible given technological and financial constraints, so the in-place containment with clay slurries and various forms of site monitoring was performed. As of July 2024, the area is restricted by a surrounding fence with "no trespassing" signs. Some remains of the baseball field can be found in the surrounding wooded areas. As of August 2023, the site is currently in an operations and maintenance phase and monitored by the EPA.

In 2010, there was a contaminant leak discovered at the site. According to the EPA Superfund Remedial Project Manager at the time, Gary Miller, the contaminant plume posed no threat to residents.

The Third Five-Year Review was completed on April 25, 2008. The review found that the remedy at the site was protective of human health and the environment. Elevated groundwater contaminant concentrations have been reported in the Fifty-Foot Sand water-bearing zone (FFSZ) at one well within the Brio Site boundary. The Brio Site Task Force is completing field work for an investigation of the FFSZ groundwater at multiple locations on site in order to assess the need for further remedial action. The next Five-Year Review Report is scheduled for completion in 2028.

The Sixth Five-Year Review was completed in September 2023, in which the EPA said the remedial actions performed are acting as designed.

== See also ==
- List of Superfund sites in Texas
