= List of Superfund sites in Texas =

This is a list of Superfund sites in Texas designated under the Comprehensive Environmental Response, Compensation, and Liability Act (CERCLA) environmental law. The CERCLA federal law of 1980 authorized the United States Environmental Protection Agency (EPA) to create a list of polluted locations requiring a long-term response to clean up hazardous material contaminations. These locations are known as Superfund sites, and are placed on the National Priorities List (NPL).

The NPL guides the EPA in "determining which sites warrant further investigation" for environmental remediation. As of September 6, 2017, there are 53 Superfund sites on the National Priorities List in Texas. One new site has been proposed for inclusion on the list. Twelve additional sites have been cleaned up and are considered deleted, with no further action required. One NPL site included in this list, Motco, Inc., has been designated as the state's Top Priority Site. According to CERCLA, states may make only one such designation and is one that the State has identified as presenting the greatest danger to public health, welfare, or the environment among the known facilities in that State.

== Superfund sites ==
Proposed for addition to National Priorities List
Deleted from National Priorities List

CERCLIS ID	Name	County	Reason	Proposed	Listed	Construction completed	Partially deleted	Deleted
TX7572024605	Air Force Plant 4 (General Dynamics)	Tarrant		10/15/1984	08/30/1990	09/15/2006	–	–
TXD008123168	ALCOA (Point Comfort)/Lavaca Bay	Calhoun		06/23/1993	02/23/1994	07/23/2007	–	–
TXD980864649	Bailey Waste Disposal	Orange		10/15/1984	06/10/1986	09/14/1998	–	10/15/2007
TXN000606565	Bandera Road Ground Water Plume	Bexar		09/27/2006	03/07/2007	–	–	–
TXD980340889	Bio-Ecology Systems, Inc.	Dallas		12/30/1982	09/08/1983	04/12/1993	–	08/05/1996
TX0000605264	Brine Service Company	Nueces		09/13/2001	09/05/2002	–	–	–
TXD980625453	Brio Refining, Inc.	Harris	Groundwater, soil, surface water contaminated with volatile organic compounds including 1,1,2-trichloroethane, 1,2-dichloroethene, 1,1-dichloroethane, 1,2-dichloroethane, 1,1-dichloroethene, vinyl chloride, phenanthrene, fluoranthene, copper, styrene, ethylbenzene, and bis(2-chloroethyl) ether.	10/15/1984	03/31/1989	04/28/2004	–	12/28/2006
TXN000606965	Circle Court Ground Water Plume	Parker		03/15/2015	09/18/2012	–	–	–
TX0001399435	City of Perryton Well No. 2	Ochiltree		09/29/1998	01/19/1999	09/30/2003	–	–
TXD008091951	Conroe Creosoting Company	Montgomery		04/30/2003	09/29/2003	09/30/2003	–	–
TXD990707010	Crystal Chemical Co.	Harris		12/30/1982	09/08/1983	10/02/2003	–	–
TXD980864763	Crystal City Airport	Zavala		10/15/1984	06/10/1986	12/26/1991	–	03/23/1995
TXD089793046	Dixie Oil Processors, Inc.	Harris		06/24/1988	10/04/1989	06/09/1993	–	08/21/2006
TX0000605363	Donna Reservoir and Canal System	Hidalgo		04/19/2006	03/19/2008	–	–	–
TXN000606614	East 67th Street Ground Water Plume	Ector		09/27/2006	03/07/2007	–	–	–
TXD086278058	Falcon Refinery	San Patricio		09/05/2002	09/16/2011	–	–	–
TXD980514814	French, Ltd.	Harris		12/30/1982	09/08/1983	09/26/1994	–	–
TXD007330053	Garland Creosoting	Gregg		07/22/1999	10/22/1999	08/12/2010	–	–
TXD980748453	Geneva Industries/Fuhrmann Energy	Harris		09/08/1983	09/21/1984	09/14/1993	04/08/1997	–
TXD980748453	Gulfco Marine Maintenance	Brazoria		09/05/2002	04/30/2003	09/29/2011	–	–
TXD980745582	Harris (Farley Street)	Harris		07/23/1982	09/08/1983	04/18/1988	–	04/18/1988
TXD050299577	Hart Creosoting Company	Jasper		04/23/1999	07/22/1999	09/12/2008	–	–
TXD980514996	Highlands Acid Pit	Harris		07/23/1982	09/08/1983	06/29/1992	–	–
TXD008096240	Jasper Creosoting Company Inc	Jasper		03/06/1998	07/28/1998	09/12/2008	–	–
TXN000605460	Jones Road GW Plume	Harris	Tetrachloroethylene, trichloroethylene, 1,2-dichloroethylene and vinyl chloride were found in groundwater at the site.	04/30/2003	09/29/2003	–	–	–
TXD980623904	Koppers Co, Inc. (Texarkana Plant)	Bowie		10/15/1984	06/10/1986	08/20/2002	–	–
TX7213821831	Lone Star Army Ammunition Plant	Bowie	Soil contaminated with tetryl, mercury, chromium, and lead.	10/15/1984	07/22/1987	09/24/2002	–	–
TX6213820529	Longhorn Army Ammunition Plant	Harrison	Groundwater contaminated with methylene chloride and trichloroethene. Perchlorate, lead, and mercury were also found on the site and in nearby streams.	07/14/1989	08/30/1990	–	–	–
TXN000607441	Main Street Ground Water Plume	Burnet	Ground water plume of trichloroethylene with no identified source.	03/26/2015	09/30/2015	–	–	–
TXD980864789	Malone Service Company, Inc.	Galveston		08/24/2000	06/14/2001	–	–	–
TXD008083404	Many Diversified Interests, Inc.	Harris		09/29/1998	01/19/1999	08/31/2009	08/16/2010	–
TXN000606668	Midessa Ground Water Plume	Midland	Ground water plume of VOCs with no identified source.	04/19/2006	03/19/2008	–	–	–
TXD980629851	Motco, Inc.	Galveston		12/30/1982	09/08/1983	09/30/1997	–	–
TXD980873343	North Cavalcade Street	Harris		10/15/1984	06/10/1986	08/31/2011	–	–
TXN000606760	North East 2nd Street (formerly Attebury Grain Storage Facility)	Swisher	Soil contaminated with 1,2-dibromoethane, 1,2-dichloroethane and trichloroethylene as well as carbon tetrachloride, used by firefighters in 1962 after the facility burned to the ground.	03/19/2008	04/09/2009	–	–	–
TXD980867279	Odessa Chromium#1	Ector	Groundwater contaminated with hexavalent chromium.	10/15/1984	06/10/1986	03/16/1994	–	–
TXD980697114	Odessa Chromium#2 (Andrews Highway)	Ector	Groundwater contaminated with hexavalent chromium.	10/15/1984	06/10/1986	09/09/1994	–	07/19/2004
TXD980513808	Old ESCO Manufacturing	Hunt	Soil contaminated by lead and PCBs.	03/19/2008	09/03/2008	09/29/2011	–	09/10/2018
TXD068104561	Palmer Barge Line	Jefferson		05/11/2000	07/27/2000	09/28/2007	–	02/06/2012
TX4890110527	Pantex Plant (USDOE)	Carson	Materials such as acetone, toluene, tetrahydrofuran, trichloroethylene (TCE), bromoform, 1,2-dichloroethane, arsenic, barium, chromium, lead, mercury, and silver were found in waste waters. Materials such as acetone, TCE, tetrahydrofuran, toluene, 1,2-dichloroethane, 2-butanone, tetrachloroethylene, and 1,1,1-trichloroethane were found in the soil. Principal soil and water contaminants are RDX, trinitrotoluene (TNT), depleted uranium, hexavalent chromium, perchlorate, and trichloroethene (TCE).	07/29/1991	05/31/1994	07/29/2009	–	–
TX0000605329	Patrick Bayou	Harris	Sediments contaminated with PCBs, pesticides, heavy metals and polynuclear aromatic hydrocarbons.	06/14/2001	09/05/2002	–	–	–
TXD980699656	Pesses Chemical Co.	Tarrant		10/15/1984	06/10/1986	09/28/1992	–	09/28/1995
TXD980873350	Petro-Chemical Systems, (Turtle Bayou)	Liberty		10/15/1984	06/10/1986	09/30/2010	–	–
TXD057577579	R & H Oil/Tropicana	Bexar		06/14/2001	–	–	–	–
TXD066379645	Rockwool Industries Inc	Bell		03/06/1998	09/29/1998	09/29/2005	–	–
TXD079348397	RSR Corp.	Dallas		05/10/1993	09/29/1995	09/28/2004	10/16/2007	–
TXN000605649	Sandy Beach Road Ground Water Plume	Tarrant	Groundwater contaminated with VOCs.	04/27/2005	09/14/2005	–	–	–
TXN000606611	San Jacinto River Waste Pits	Harris		04/19/2006	03/19/2008	–	–	–
TXD062132147	Sheridan Disposal Services	Waller		06/10/1986	03/31/1989	05/01/2006	–	–
TXD980513956	Sikes Disposal Pits	Harris		12/30/1982	09/08/1983	01/30/1995	–	–
TXD980873327	Sol Lynn/Industrial Transformers	Harris		10/15/1984	03/31/1989	09/29/1993	–	–
TXD980810386	South Cavalcade Street	Harris	Soil and groundwater contaminated with VOCs, PAHs, and metal salts.	10/15/1984	06/10/1986	09/15/2000	–	–
TX0001407444	Sprague Road Ground Water Plume	Ector	Groundwater contaminated with chromium.	04/01/1997	09/25/1997	09/29/2003	–	–
TX0001414341	Star Lake Canal	Jefferson		07/22/1999	07/27/2000	–	–	–
TXD099801102	State Marine of Port Arthur	Jefferson		03/06/1998	07/28/1998	06/22/2007	–	02/06/2012
TXSFN0605177	State Road 114 Ground Water Plume	Hockley	Ground water plume of 1,2-dichloroethane, benzene and vanadium with no identified source.	07/22/1999	10/22/1999	09/01/2009	–	–
TXD055337281	Stewco, Inc.	Harrison		10/15/1984	06/10/1986	09/14/1992	–	10/04/1995
TXD008056152	Texarkana Wood Preserving Co.	Bowie		04/10/1985	06/10/1986	09/21/2012	–	–
TXD062113329	Tex-Tin Corp	Galveston		06/17/1996	09/18/1998	09/20/2004	10/15/2002	–
TXD055143705	Triangle Chemical Co.	Orange		12/30/1982	09/08/1983	09/27/1990	–	04/08/1997
TXD980745574	United Creosoting Co.	Montgomery		09/06/1983	09/21/1984	09/30/1999	–	–
TXN000607093	US Oil Recovery	Harris	Arsenic, barium, cobalt, manganese, mercury, silver, vanadium, acetone, benzene, toluene, ethyl benzene, methyl ethyl ketone, naphthalene and bis(2-ethylhexyl) phthalate were present in onsite sources.	03/15/2012	09/08/2012	–	–	–
TXD007357932	Van der Horst USA Corporation	Kaufman	Spent kerosene, wastewater treatment sludge, and chromium contaminated wastewater and soil.	09/03/2009	03/04/2010	–	–	–
TXN000606992	West County Road 112 Ground Water	Midland	Ground water plume of chromium and hexavalent chromium with no identified source.	10/21/2010	03/10/2011	–	–	–

== See also ==
- List of Superfund sites in the United States
- List of environmental issues
- List of waste types
- TOXMAP
