= Orange Valley Regional Groundwater Superfund site =

Coordinates: 40.7796°N 74.2244°W

The Orange Valley Regional Groundwater Superfund site is a group of wells in Orange and West Orange, two municipalities in Essex County, New Jersey, United States. The groundwater in the public wells are contaminated with the hazardous chemicals of Trichloroethylene (TCE), Dichloroethene (DCE), Tetrachloroethylene (Perchloroethene), 1,1-Dichloroethene (1,1-DCE), and 1,2-Dichloroethene (1,2-DCE). These chemicals pose a huge risk to the towns nearby population, as the wells are a source of public drinking water. In March 2012, the site was added to the National Priorities List (NPL) of the United States Environmental Protection Agency (EPA) Superfund site list.

== Origins ==
This site was originally several public wells filled with groundwater that gave public drinking water to the town of West Orange, New Jersey, and Orange, New Jersey, in Essex County.

=== Town History ===
West Orange is a town in Essex County, New Jersey, and is surrounded by the towns of Orange, Montclair, Maplewood, East Orange, Bloomfield, South Orange, Cedar Grove, Livingston, West Caldwell, Millburn, and several others. The town was originally “a smaller town of Fairmont in 1862 and wasn’t called “West Orange” until 1863. The town has over 200 years of history before the American Revolution, which led to the founding of the town.” According to The Township of West Orange website, “The residents of West Orange today make up a diverse population with a proud community heritage.”

=== Company History ===
In the case of the Orange Valley Regional Groundwater site, the EPA was unable to find the company responsible for the contamination of the site. The EPA is continuing to look for the source of the toxic chemicals, but there has been no progress made so far. Finding the source of the toxic chemicals, in this case, has been very difficult for the EPA. The possible reason why it is so difficult for the EPA to find the company responsible is because the company that caused the toxic waste to contaminate the wells may no longer be in business. Also, many industrial businesses in West Orange likely use the chemicals that were found in the well water. This included many even more industrial businesses in the past, too, when toxic waste was not regulated.

== Superfund Designation ==
The site was proposed to be added to the NPL of the EPA's Superfund site list on March 15, 2012, and was officially added on September 18, 2012. The New Jersey Department of Health (NJDOH) and the Agency for Toxic Substances and Disease Registry (ATSDR) reviewed the environmental data obtained from the site and evaluated potential human exposure to contaminants. This was to determine whether the exposures were of concern to public health. They found that the site was contaminated with the toxic chemicals of Tetrachloroethene (PCE), Trichloroethylene (TCE), 1,1-Dichloroethene (1,1-DCE), and 1,2-Dichloroethene (1,2-DCE). The NJDOH and ATSDR concluded that the public was at risk for higher cancer rates than other areas because of contaminated groundwater.

=== State Intervention ===
The Orange Water Department originally installed a treatment system for the wells, hoping to remove the contaminants and provide the community with safe drinking water. The water from those wells was monitored regularly. The regular monitoring ensured that the treatment system was effective and the people's health was protected. The former Brook Lane public supply well, located between the Orange Park and Gist Place wells, was also taken out of service to protect the public from the contamination. In the article EPA Proposes to Add an Area of Orange and West Orange, N.J. to the Superfund List; Protecting Drinking Water EPA Priority, “In 2011, the New Jersey Department of Environmental Protection asked EPA to consider the Orange Valley Regional Ground Water site for inclusion on the federal Superfund list.”

=== National Intervention ===
The Preliminary Assessment, or site investigation, was completed on September 30, 1992. In June 2009, the EPA collected groundwater samples from public water supply wells for the site investigation. The site was proposed to be added to the NPL on March 15, 2012, and finalized on September 18, 2012. As of today, a remedy plan has not been selected, remedial action has not begun started, remedy construction has neither been completed nor deleted from the NPL, has not had a five-year review, and there is no plan for reuse and redevelopment of the site.

== Health & Environmental Hazards ==
The chemicals found at the site were Trichloroethene (TCE), Tetrachloroethene (Perchloroethene), Dichloroethene (DCE), 1,1-Dichloroethene (1,1-DCE), and 1,2-Dichloroethene (1,2-DCE). The side effects of exposure to these substances in the human body are a higher risk of cancers, including kidney and liver cancer and tumors. The health hazards of these chemicals have caused the contaminated wells of Orange Park, Gist Place, and Brook Lanes to be shut down.

=== Damage/Hazard 1 ===
Trichloroethene, or Trichloroethylene, which is also abbreviated to TCE, is one chemical found in the contaminated groundwater. The chemical, which was listed on the New York State Department of Environmental Conservation's Glossary of Environment Cleanup Terms, is defined by the EPA as “a colorless, man-made liquid used primarily as a solvent for removing grease from metal.” Studies conducted by the EPA in 2011 show that TCE causes kidney cancer and may also cause liver cancer and non-Hodgkin lymphoma. The EPA's mechanistic analyses supports a mutagenicity in TCE-induced kidney carcinogenicity. Exposure to the toxin can result in autoimmune diseases and hypersensitivity. TCE can also play a role in developmental cardiac toxicity. In the document Human Health Effects of Trichloroethylene: Key Findings and Scientific Issues, it is stated that “TCE is carcinogenic to humans by all routes of exposure and poses a potential human health hazard for noncancer toxicity to the central nervous system, kidney, liver, immune system, male reproductive system, and the developing embryo/fetus.”

=== Damage/Hazard 2 ===
Tetrachloroethene, or Perchloroethene, also called PCE, is a chemical solvent used as a dry cleaning agent and a degreaser. On the New York State Department of Environmental Conservation's website, in its Glossary of Environmental Cleanup Terms, the chemical is described as being “a clear, colorless, nonflammable liquid with a characteristic odor.” The main types of exposure are through inhalation of the vapor, which can come from contaminated soil or water, and ingestion of contaminated water. Chronic exposure to the chemical has been shown to cause vision deficiencies. The toxicity of the chemical is recorded as being “moderate to low,” but there are some severe health risks. Being a Group 2A carcinogen makes it possibly dangerous to humans. It is also a known central nervous system depressant and can dissolves fats from the skin, causing skin irritation. There is the increased risk of developing Parkinson's disease, too. Also, PCE has been shown to cause liver tumors and kidney tumors. When heated at temperatures over 315 °C (599 °F), it can be oxidized into phosgene, an extremely poisonous gas.

=== Damage/Hazard 3 ===
Dichloroethene, or DCE, are “chemicals with similar molecular structures used to make specialty chemicals and pharmaceuticals.” DCE chemicals are used as degradation products of trichloroethene, making them found mostly at hazardous waste sites like the Orange Valley Regional Groundwater site. There are two different types of DCE, known as 1,1-Dichloroethene, or 1,1-DCE, and 1,2-Dichloroethene, or 1,2-DCE. These chemicals have “similar molecular structures used to produce a variety of consumer and industrial products, such as specialty chemicals and cleaning products.” DCE, 1,1-DCE, and 1,2-DCE exposure can be through ingestion, inhalation, skin contact, and eye contact. DCE targets the skin, liver, kidneys, lungs, and central nervous system, in which exposure can result in irritation of the skin, liver damage, kidney damage, lung damage, and central nervous system depression.

== Cleanup ==
In the early 1980s, when the contamination was first discovered, the Orange Water Department installed treatment systems, like filtration systems, and heavily monitored the water. In June or July 2009, the EPA collected samples from the sites public wells and found toxic chemicals in the water supply. The wells were shut down and the EPA began to propose that it become a Superfund site on the NPL. Today, the wells are still out of use and the EPA, along with the state legislature and the Orange Water Department, are continuing to monitor the water supply after installing a new filtration system.

=== Initial Cleanup ===
Originally, when the contamination was discovered in the early 1980s, the Orange Water Department installed treatment systems to remove the toxins from the contaminated groundwater and monitored the water quality and treatment system effectiveness regularly. When investigating an industrial facility in West Orange, New Jersey in June–July 2009, the EPA collected untreated groundwater samples from three public supply wells of Gist Place, Orange Park, Brook Alley, and Well 6, within the Orange Water Department supply system. When the results showed toxic industrial chemicals in the wells Orange Water Department closed down the contaminated wells. They then contacted the EPA and proposed the site being added to the Superfund site list and the NPL.

=== Current status ===
The wells on the site are currently unused. The water in the wells are continuously monitored and a new filtration system has been installed to treat the water. The EPA has not selected a remedy for the site, no remedial action has been started, remedy construction has not been completed, and no plan for reuse and redevelopment of the site has been proposed. Several Performance measures have insufficient data or not been performed. This includes human exposure being under control, control of groundwater migration, completion of construction, and readiness for the site to be anticipated use. There is insufficient data for control of human exposure, meaning that due to uncertainty regarding exposures, one cannot draw conclusions as to whether human exposures are controlled, typically because response to the contamination has not begun or the response has begun, but it has not yet generated information sufficiently reliable to evaluate whether there are currently any unacceptable human exposure pathways at the site. There is insufficient data for groundwater migration control, meaning that due to uncertainty regarding contaminated groundwater migration, EPA cannot draw conclusions as to whether the migration of contaminated groundwater is stabilized. No for construction completion means either physical construction is not complete or actions are still needed to address contamination. There is no anticipation of the site to be in use, meaning that one or more of these criteria above has not been met, or the site may still have redevelopment occurring on portions of the site and may be eligible for additional redevelopment.

== See also ==
- EPA's list of Superfund sites https://www.epa.gov/superfund/national-priorities-list-npl-sites-state
- Wikipedia's list of Super Superfund sites List of Superfund sites
- EPA's Superfund page https://www.epa.gov/superfund
