= K & L Avenue Landfill =

Superfund site in Oshtemo Township, Michigan, U.S.

- Superfund site
- Location within Michigan
- Location: Oshtemo Township, Kalamazoo, Michigan; 42.282888°N 85.716696°W

Information
- CERCLIS ID: MID980506463
- Contaminants: volatile organic compounds, phenols, and heavy metals (groundwater); polychlorinated biphenyl (soil)

Progress

The K & L Avenue Landfill, also known by the spelling K&L Avenue Landfill, is an 87-acre (35-hectare) Superfund site accessed from KL Avenue in Oshtemo Township, Kalamazoo County, Michigan. It is one of six Superfund sites in the Kalamazoo River watershed.

The site was used as a sanitary landfill, first by Oshtemo Township from the 1960s until 1968, and then by Kalamazoo County. Landfill operations stopped in 1979 upon the discovery of contaminants in residential wells. Groundwater in the area was found to be contaminated with volatile organic compounds, phenols, and heavy metals, with localized polychlorinated biphenyl contamination in soils.

In 1980 and 1981, impacted residences variously had new wells installed or were connected to a public water supply by the Kalamazoo County government. Additional residences were transferred to public water supplies in 1999 and 2004. In 2005 and 2006, a landfill cap was constructed, and in March 2008, the landfill's passive gas vents were replaced with a gas extraction system intended to address the generation of methane by the landfill.

Groundwater contaminants determined to be (or to have formerly been) present at the site include:

- 1,1-Dichloroethane
- 1,2-Dichloroethane
- 2-Butanone
- 2-Hexanone
- 4-Methyl-2-pentanone
- 4-methylphenol
- acetone
- ammonia
- barium
- benzene
- benzoic acid
- cadmium
- chloroethane
- chloroethene (vinyl chloride)
- chromium
- ethylbenzene
- iron
- lead
- manganese
- methyl isobutyl ketone (MIBK)
- nickel
- phenol
- toluene
- Trans-1,2 dichloroethene
- xylene
- zinc

== See also ==
- List of Superfund sites in Michigan
