= 1,1-DCE =

1,1-DCE may refer to:

- 1,1-Dichloroethane
- 1,1-Dichloroethene, also known as 1,1-dichloroethylene, vinylidene chloride, or 1,1-DCE
