= Glasgow Committee on Anæsthetics =

The Glasgow Committee on Anæsthetics was formed in 1875 at the annual meeting of the British Medical Association in Edinburgh. A "large committee of notables, headed by Professor [Joseph] Lister" "to enquire into the report upon the use in surgery of various anaesthetic agents and mixtures of such agents". However, they did not succeed, but a subcommittee consisting of Davind Newman (a Pathological Chemist to the Western Infirmary) Joseph Coates (Pathologist to the Western Infirmary) and Professor McKendrik (Physiologist at Glasgow University) became known as the Glasgow Committee and began work in 1877.

They recommended the use of 1,1-dichloroethane (ethylidene dichloride).
