= Kalamazoo Superfund Site =

Allied Paper, Inc./Portage Creek/Kalamazoo River
- Superfund site
- Location within Michigan
- Location: Kalamazoo, Kalamazoo and Allegan, Michigan; 42°17′43″N 85°34′23″W

Information
- CERCLIS ID: MID006007306
- Contaminants: Polychlorinated biphenyls
- Responsible parties: Georgia-Pacific Corporation, Millennium Holdings, LLC

Progress
- Proposed: 5 May 1989
- Listed: 30 August 1990

The Allied Paper, Inc./Portage Creek/Kalamazoo River in southwestern Michigan was declared by the Environmental Protection Agency (EPA) to be a Superfund site in 1990 at an industrial site containing significant amounts of toxic waste. The EPA and companies responsible for the waste in this area, which includes a three-mile section (4.8 km) of Portage Creek as well as part of the Kalamazoo River, into which it flows, are currently involved in an effort to reduce the amount of toxic waste at the site, which is contaminated by PCBs (polychlorinated biphenyls) from paper mills and other factories.

== History ==
After the Industrial Revolution, many paper mills that sprouted up along the Kalamazoo River were found to be the cause of PCB contamination. The publication in a 1953 issue of Life Magazine of a photograph depicting dead carp floating in the Kalamazoo River drew national attention to the public interest. The Kalamazoo Superfund site was added to the National Priorities List on August 30, 1990, and the First Cleanup Action began in late 1990. Between 1990 and 2000, under an agreement with the EPA and the State of Michigan, several of the current and past owners of plants that had been responsible for the contamination investigated the Portage Creek site.

== Remediation ==
The Kalamazoo River makes up a large portion of the Kalamazoo River Watershed, which spans about 162 miles (261 km) and feeds into Lake Michigan. The 80 miles (130 km) of the Kalamazoo River and Portage Creek are officially divided into five sections known as Operable Units (OU): Allied Paper/ Bryant Mill Pond (1), Willow Boulevard and A-Site Landfill (2), King Highway Landfill (3), 12th Street Landfill (4), and the Portage Creek (5). Portage Creek is southwest of Kalamazoo, connecting to the Kalamazoo River near the King’s Highway Operable Unit. The Michigan Department of Environmental Quality (MDEQ) manages the Superfund site.

The cleanup of Kalamazoo River Superfund site started upstream and has moved downstream. First, extant PCB sources were removed, with particular concern being expressed about the continuing release of PCBs in the Bryant Mill Pond area, where a $7.5 million removal program was carried out from June 1998 to May 1999. Two of the Operable Units, King Highway Landfill and Allied Inc., had sheet pile and caps installed, a process which does not remove PCBs but serves as a protective layering containing them. Time Critical Removal Action was declared in spring 2007 at the Plainwell site, where the removal process included sediment removal and the reintroduction of native plants. Any waste containing over 50 ppm (parts per million) of PCB was disposed of in Bellville’s Environmental Quality Corporation Wayne Disposal Landfill. Most of the waste, however, had a lower PCB concentration and was disposed of at nearby landfills.

Since 1998, EPA, working with Potentially Responsible Parties, has removed nearly 450,000 cubic yards of contaminated material from the site, cleaned up and restored seven miles of the Kalamazoo River and banks, and capped 82 acres worth of contaminated material to lock it away.

In September 2015, EPA signed a document called the Record of Decision for Area 1 of the river - Area 1 is the portion of the Kalamazoo River between Morrow Dam and the former Plainwell Dam, and includes Portage Creek between Cork Street and the Kalamazoo River. The cleanup for Area 1 includes excavation of PCB-contaminated areas in a two-mile section (3.2 km) of the Kalamazoo River near the confluence of Portage Creek, and floodplain soil removal in the Plainwell Impoundment near the former Plainwell Dam. EPA projects that remediation work will begin in 2019.

On December 21, 2016, EPA issued a Unilateral Administrative Order to Georgia-Pacific, International Paper and Weyerhaeuser to conduct the work specified in the record of decision. In September 2017, EPA signed a record of decision for Area 2 of the river - Area 2 is the portion of the Kalamazoo River between the former Plainwell Dam and the Otsego City Dam. The Area 2 cleanup includes removal of the Otsego City Dam, realignment of the river to create a single stable channel, bank soil and PCB “hot spot” excavation, capping of the anabranch areas (areas where streams break away from the main river and then rejoin further downstream), and long-term monitoring.

- Operable Unit 5 – Area 2 Record of Decision (PDF) (111pp, 19.39MB) September 2017

In Feb. 2016, EPA approved the Area 3 site investigation report, which details the results of soil and water sampling at the site. This report indicated high levels of PCB-contamination in the soil and sediment. In August 2016, work began on a Time-Critical Removal Action in the Kalamazoo River upstream of the Otsego Township Dam and the M-89 bridge, which was completed in August 2018.

Georgia-Pacific submitted the draft Area 4 site investigation report in Sept. 2017 - Area 4 is the Kalamazoo River between the Otsego Township Dam and Trowbridge Dam. This document shows where and how soil and sediment sampling was conducted in Area 4 of the river. EPA is currently reviewing this document.

The Area 5 site investigation officially began in November 2016 - Area 5 is the Kalamazoo River between the Trowbridge Dam and Allegan City Dam. Georgia-Pacific began field investigations in October 2017.

=== Allied Paper Landfill ===
EPA has been working with the bankruptcy Trustee for Allied Landfill to implement the design for the cleanup selected in the September 21, 2016, Record of Decision. The cleanup plan, or remedy, includes consolidation and capping of the waste into a 27-acre area (11 ha) and long-term groundwater monitoring. The project is currently in the design phase. EPA expects cleanup work to begin by 2020 and take up to three years to complete.

- Operable Unit 1 - Allied Landfill Record of Decision (PDF) (138pp, 24.6MB) September 2016

=== Otsego Township Dam ===
In the later summer of 2018, the EPA completed the removal of PCB-contaminated sediment and soil along the Kalamazoo River near the Otsego Township Dam. The project involved a 1.7-mile area (2.7 km) of PCB-contaminated sediment and soil immediately upstream of the former Otsego Township Dam. Between initial dredging in August 2016 and project completion in August 2018, workers dredged over 50,000 tons (33,000 cubic yards) of sediment and soil, stabilized riverbanks to prevent future contamination and erosion, and disposed of contaminated materials at an approved landfill.

A temporary water control structure that was built in 2015 to replace the dam was removed, and the river is now an open channel. The area around the former auxiliary spillway has been restored as a wetland area. There are two public parking areas built at former project staging areas. The river is now open, and there is access to the river at these areas for kayaks and canoes.

=== Plainwell Mill ===
EPA signed a record of decision for the former Plainwell Paper Mill in Sept. 2015. The selected cleanup plan requires the excavation and off-site disposal of contaminated soil from the former mill site. The cleanup work plans were finalized in Sept. 2016, and Pre-Design Investigation work was completed in 2017. Cleanup work will start once EPA approves the work plan, expected in 2018 or early 2019.

=== Portage Creek ===
Work on the last OU, Portage Creek, began in September 2011. From April to October 2012, the EPA removed about 12,000 cubic yards of PCB-contaminated soil and sediment from Portage Creek, replaced it with clean sediment, and planted new trees and other vegetation. The EPA planned to return to the site in March 2013 to “try to complete the last segment of Portage Creek, where the creek and the Kalamazoo River meet.” If necessary, the EPA planned additional work at Portage Creek in the summer of 2014.

== Technical background ==
The Comprehensive Environmental Response, Compensation and Liability Act, which was passed in 1980, calls for the cleaning up, under EPA supervision, of abandoned hazardous waste sites that release pollutants into the environment. The EPA works at the Kalamazoo Superfund site in conjunction with state and regional interest groups.

The Potentially Responsible Party is an individual, corporation, or group that can be held financially responsible, at least in part, for the cleanup of the Superfund site. Recent court actions have resulted in the following companies being identified by the U.S. Environmental Protection Agency (EPA) as Potentially Responsible Parties for the Kalamazoo River: NCR, International Paper Company, Georgia-Pacific LLC, Weyerhaeuser and Millennium Holdings.

Polychlorinated biphenyls (PCB) constitute a wide array of now-banned organic chemicals with a variety of industrial applications. At the Kalamazoo River site, most PCBs are a result of the recycling of carbonless copy paper during the 1970s, the waste products from which were dumped into the river. PCBs were produced from 1929 to 1979, when they were banned by the Toxic Substances Control Act.

PCBs are human carcinogens, and can also have a negative effect on the human immune, reproductive, and endocrine systems. PCBs in the Kalamazoo River adhere to the fatty tissue of fish, and over time a process of bioaccumulation takes place, meaning that the PCBs appear in increasing concentrations in organisms higher up on the food chain, including humans. A report by the Michigan Department of Health in 2002 found that the Kalamazoo River is now safe for recreational use despite some PCB contamination.

The National Priorities List (NPL) allows for highly hazardous sites to be dealt with immediately. Substances deemed toxic are given Hazard Ranking System Package scores based on the level of toxicity and the potential hazard to human health and the ecosystem. Sites with Hazard Ranking System Package scores of 28.5 or higher out of 100 are placed on the NPL, pending official approval.

== See also ==
- List of Superfund sites in Michigan
