= Muskegon Chemical Co. =

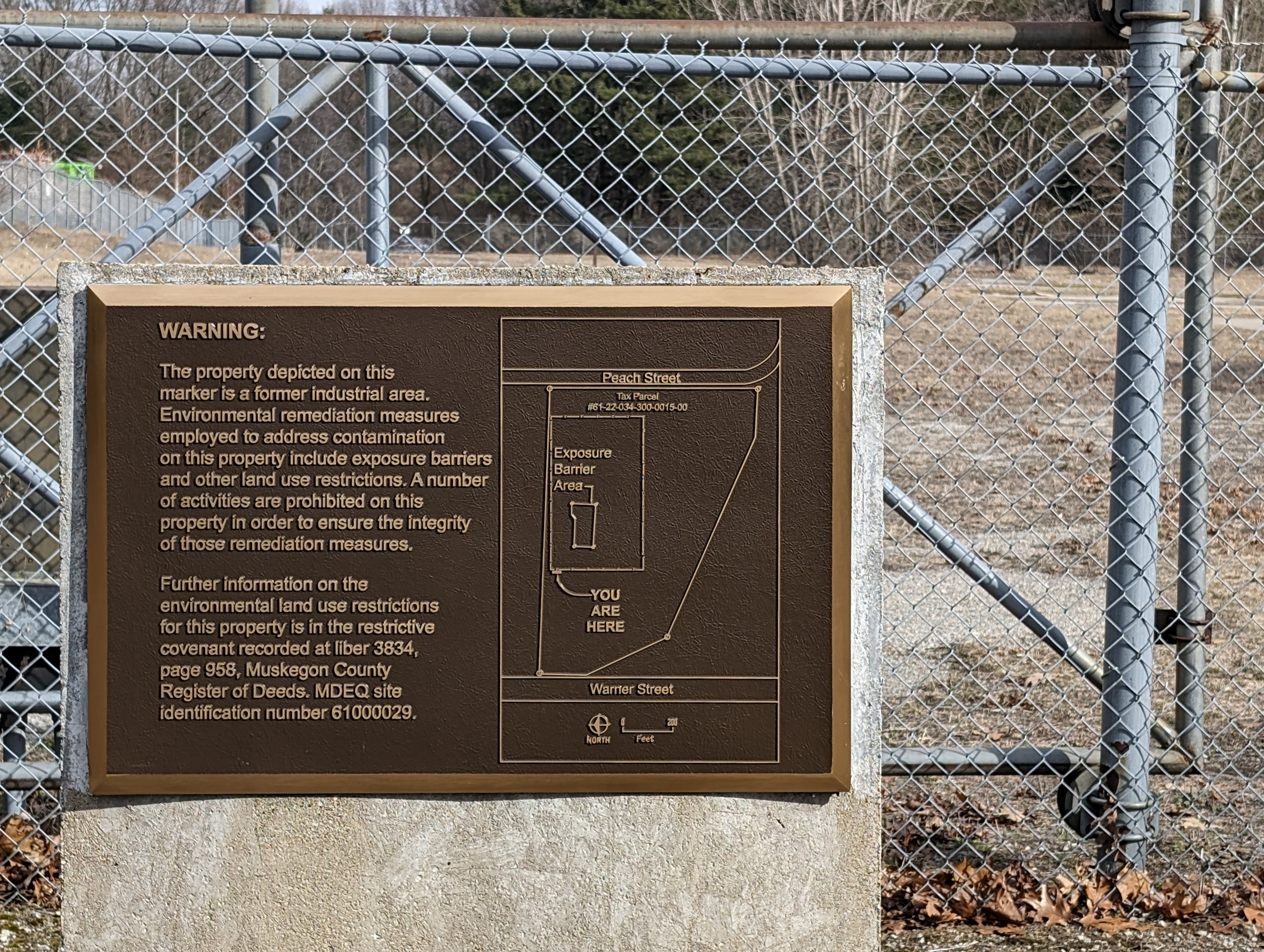
Signage at the front gate of the Muskegon Chemical Company Superfund site.

The Muskegon Chemical Company is a 19.6 acre Superfund site located in Muskegon County, Michigan.

== History ==
The Muskegon Chemical Co. was founded in 1957, and ran until 1993. The site was founded by John R. Yost Jr. who was also the vice president and chief operating officer at the Ott/Story/Cordova Chemical Company. He founded Muskegon Chemical Company in the Whitehall Industrial Park to manufacture chemicals primarily for the pharmaceutical industry.

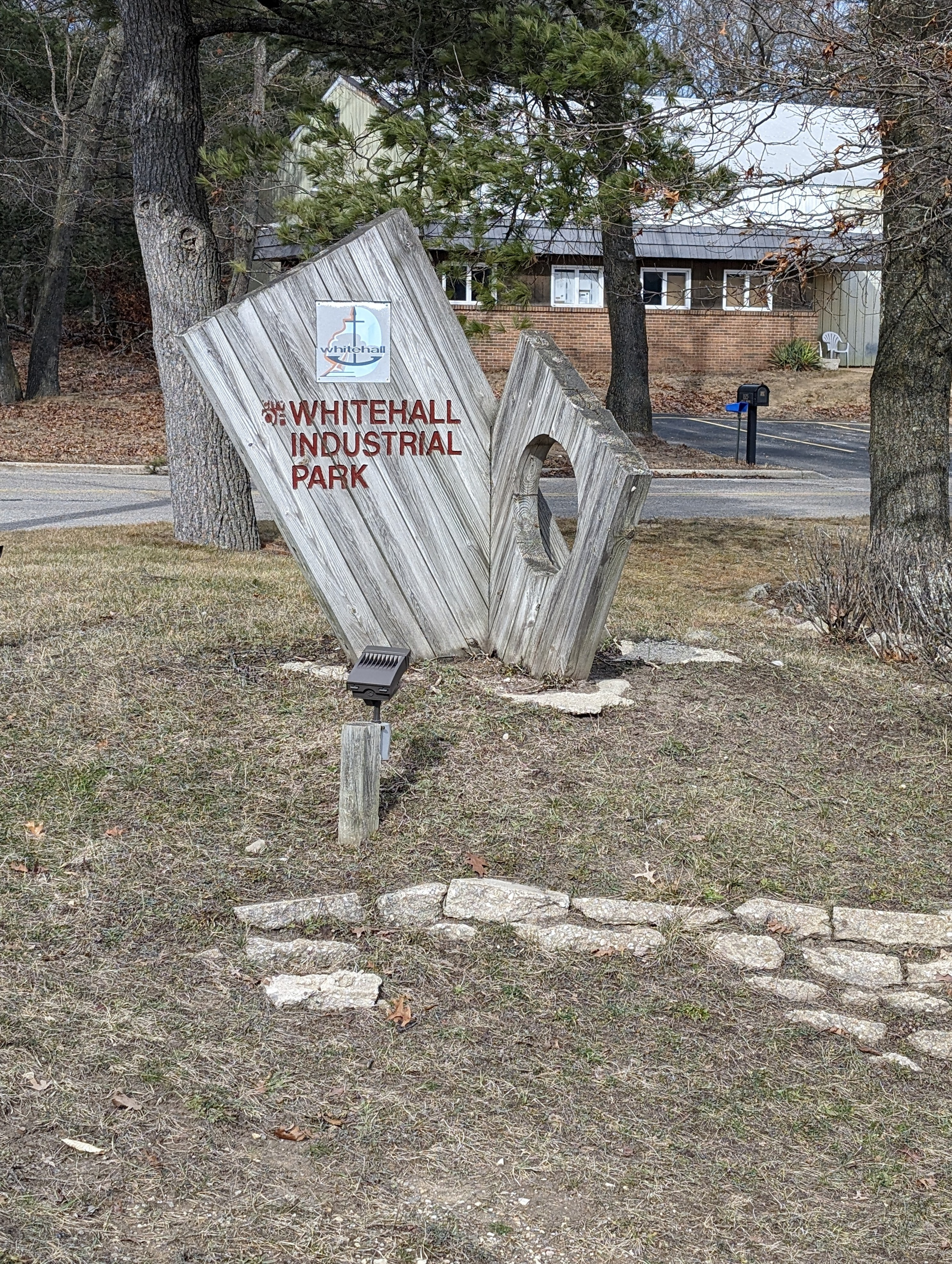
A sign depicting the "Whitehall Industrial Park".

== Impacts and cause ==
The site was contaminated with dichloroethane, bis-(2-chlorophyll)ether, and triglycol dichloride. It was determined that there was a leak in the drainage system inside the facility that contaminated the soil and groundwater around the site.

== Cleanup ==
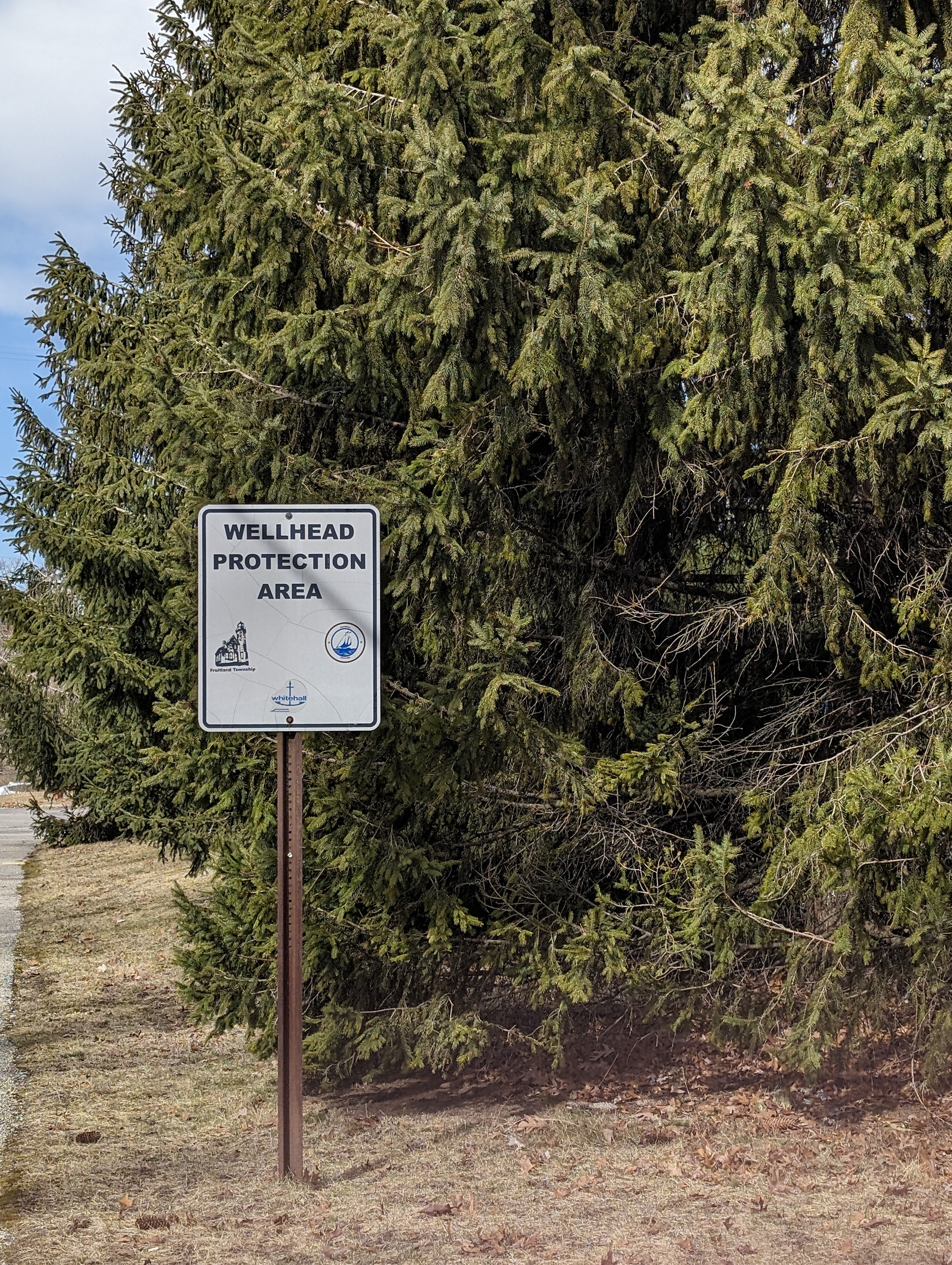
A sign depicting a "Well Head Protection" area near the Muskegon Chemical Company.

The remediation process involves several steps to address groundwater contamination. Groundwater is extracted to prevent the contaminated plume from reaching Mill Pond Creek. Carbon adsorption is employed to remove organic contaminants. The treated water is safely discharged into the Whitehall Area Publicly Owned Treatment Works. Regular monitoring of surface water, groundwater, soil, and air evaluates the system’s effectiveness.

== Current day ==
The Muskegon Chemical Co. currently has "Hazardous Ranking" score of 34.19 And the status of the site is “Completed” which means that All the facilities necessary for cleanup have been built.
