= G&H Landfill =

- Superfund site
- Location within Michigan
- Location: Shelby Charter Township, Macomb, Michigan; 42.668372°N 83.080789°W

Information
- CERCLIS ID: MID980410823
- Contaminants: naphthalene, benzene, xylene, arsenic, ethylbenzene, trichloroethene, tetrachloroethene, dichloroethene, vinyl chloride, PCBs and lead

Progress

The G&H Industrial Landfill is a Superfund site located in Shelby Charter Township near Utica, Michigan, United States. The 60-acre (24-hectare) landfill, with about 10 to 20 acres (4.0 to 8.1 hectares) of adjacent property, operated as a waste oil recovery facility from 1955 to 1967. From 1955 to 1974 the site was used as an industrial and municipal landfill. Contaminated soil, surface water, and groundwater with hazardous chemicals have been left behind as a result of the disposal of waste solvents, waste oil and paint sludge. Operation and maintenance activities are ongoing following the cleanup.

== Cleanup activities ==
The site is being addressed through federal, state and potentially responsible party actions. Several five-year reviews have been conducted by the EPA which ensure that the remedies put in place will protect public health and the environment, and function as the site decision documents intended. The most recent of these reviews has revealed that without further evaluation of the groundwater and leachate extraction systems, a protectiveness determination for the remedy at the site cannot be made. Attainment of the cleanup standards and implementation of institutional controls is required in order to continue to protect the remedy.

Contaminants found at this site include naphthalene, benzene, xylene, arsenic, ethylbenzene, trichloroethene, tetrachloroethene, dichloroethene, vinyl chloride, PCBs and lead.

The site's long-term remedy included:

- a landfill cover
- relocation of impacted soils beneath landfill cover
- containment of landfill areas
- groundwater extraction, treatment and monitoring
- wetland mitigation and creation

Operation and maintenance activities are ongoing since construction of the remedy took place between 1996 and 1999.

The EPA has set activity and use limitations, called institutional controls, in place at this site. Institutional controls are activity and use limitations set in place by the EPA. By using institutional controls, exposure to contamination can be reduced by limiting land and/or resource use, as well as guiding human behavior. For example, when land is not consistent with a certain level of cleanup, zoning restrictions may be set in place to prevent residential use.

No enforcement activities are currently underway at the G&H Site.

== Health and environment ==
Risks and pathways addressed by the cleanup include health risks from people ingesting or touching contaminants in soil, surface water and groundwater.

Assessments indicate that across the entire site there are currently no unacceptable human exposure pathways and the EPA has determined the site is under control for human exposure. The EPA reviewed all information on known and reasonably expected groundwater contamination and concluded the migration of contaminated groundwater is stabilized and there is no unacceptable discharge to surface water. The EPA will conduct monitoring to confirm that affected groundwater remains in the original area of contamination. The physical construction of the cleanup is complete for the entire site. However, the site is not ready for anticipated use.

== See also ==
- List of Superfund sites in Michigan
