= Tittabawassee River, Saginaw River and Bay Superfund site =

Coordinates: 43°35′56″N 84°14′19″W

Tittabawassee River, Saginaw River and Bay is a Superfund site in Midland County, Michigan. A high level of dioxins was detected in and along the Tittabawassee River and downstream. The primary source of contamination was attributed to past waste and disposal practices at the Dow Chemical Company facility in Midland, Michigan, located on the east side of the river and south of the city of Midland.

Remediation effort has been taken since 2012; Dow is mainly operating actions and the EPA oversees it.

== See also ==
- List of Superfund sites in Michigan
