= Barrels, Inc. =

- Superfund site
- Location within Michigan
- Location: Lansing, Ingham County, Michigan, 8th congressional district; 42.749852°N 84.544208°W

Information
- CERCLIS ID: MID017188673
- Contaminants: lead, zinc, volatile hydrocarbons, PCBs

Progress

Barrels, Inc. is a Superfund site located in Lansing, Michigan. The site's surface soils and groundwater have been contaminated from a storage tank and drum reclamation processes. Today the area is fenced in while cleanup options are being discussed in order to limit direct contact with the potential risks. In 1961, Barrels Inc. began working on the site, and continued until the owner abandoned the site in 1980.

== Cleanup activities ==
Cleanup options are currently being evaluated. The site is being evaluated through state, federal and Potentially Responsible Party actions. For the time being, the site will stay fenced in to limit risks of further contamination. Access to the site will be restricted and future use of the site and its groundwater will be limited as well due to anticipated institutional controls. Institutional controls are activity and use limitations set in place by the EPA. By using institutional controls, exposure to contamination can be reduced, by limiting land and/or resource use, as well as guiding human behavior. For example, when land is not consistent with a certain level of cleanup, zoning restrictions may be set in place to prevent residential use.

Lead and zinc has been detected at the site and has contaminated shallow groundwater. Heavy metals, volatile hydrocarbons, PCBs, oil, grease and other inorganic substances have been found to have contaminated on-site soils.

To address immediate threats to human health and the environment, cleanup has also included removal actions, or short-term cleanups.

== Health & environment ==
The greatest health risk to people is through ingesting or touching contaminated soil or groundwater. In the short term, exposure pathways that could result in unacceptable risks are being controlled. Currently, there are no unacceptable human exposure pathways. The EPA has determined that the site is under control for human exposure. The EPA has reviewed all the information on known and reasonably expected groundwater contamination and has concluded the migrations of contaminated groundwater is stabilized and there is no unacceptable discharge to surface water. The physical construction of the cleanup is complete for the entire site, however, the site is not completely ready for anticipated use.

== See also ==
- List of Superfund sites in Michigan
