= Adams Plating =

- Superfund site
- Location within Michigan
- Location: Lansing Charter Township, Ingham, Michigan; 42.739560°N 84.587782°W

Information
- CERCLIS ID: MID006522791
- Contaminants: arsenic, chromium, copper, nickel, zinc

Progress

Adams Plating, also known as Adam's Plating, is a 1-acre (0.40-hectare) Superfund site in Lansing Charter Township near Lansing, Michigan.

Prior to 1964, a dry cleaning business was located at the site, and stored dry cleaning fluid there in an underground storage tank, which was removed in the 1950s. Electroplating operations involving the use of chrome and various metals began in 1964, following a change in ownership. Prior to 1980, these operations contaminated the soil and groundwater at the site, most notably with chromium, along with copper, nickel, and zinc (in both soil and groundwater) and arsenic (in the soil alone). In July 1980, green-colored chromium-tainted water was found to be leaking into the basement of a residence near the site.

Following investigations at the site from 1980 to 1993, an initial cleanup was completed in 1994. The cleanup began upon completion of a remedial investigation report in March 1993 and was substantially complete by September 1994, an expedited time frame made possible in part by the absence of lead at the site, and by the absence of potentially responsible parties as designated by the Superfund law. Five-year reviews of the site have since been undertaken by the Environmental Protection Agency (EPA).

The Adams Plating building was destroyed by a fire on December 27, 2010, after which the EPA and the Michigan Department of Environmental Quality undertook an emergency cleanup that included moving hazardous chemicals from the site. EPA demolished the building and conducted additional soil cleanup at the site in 2011. The incident prompted Ingham County and Lansing Township emergency response agencies to reassess their preparedness for emergencies at contaminated sites.

The EPA recorded elevated levels of benzene in residences near the site in 2016.

== See also ==
- List of Superfund sites in Michigan
