= Forest Waste Products =

- Superfund site
- Location within Michigan
- Location: Forest Township, Genesee County, Michigan; 43.198331°N 83.545831°W

Information
- CERCLIS ID: MID980410740
- Contaminants: polybrominated biphenyls, polychlorinated biphenyls, lead, volatile organic compounds, copper, zinc

Progress

Forest Waste Products is a 120-acre (49-hectare) Superfund site in Forest Township northwest of Otisville, Michigan.

This waste disposal facility was licensed by Michigan to operate as a landfill from 1972 to 1978, taking in solid and liquid industrial waste. Solid waste, including soil contaminated with hazardous chemicals, was placed in an 11-acre (4.5 hectare) landfill on site, and liquid waste was placed in nine lagoons across the site to dry out and be disposed of when only solid waste remained. Poor screening of incoming waste at the facility led to the acceptance of toxic materials. Consequently, soil and groundwater around the site were exposed to environmental contaminants like polybrominated biphenyls, polychlorinated biphenyls, lead, volatile organic compounds, copper, and zinc.

At the end of the site's operation and after its closure, citizens near the site raised concerns about these potential toxins. Forest Waste Products was initially assessed for Superfund eligibility on May 1, 1982, and proposed to be listed on the National Priorities List on December 30, 1982. The site was listed on September 8, 1983. Sampling at the site found that residential wells nearby were not contaminated, but there was evidence of toxic contaminants in nearby soil and groundwater. Shortly thereafter, the environmental remediation effort at the site began with the facility's lagoons. From 1988 to 1989, potentially responsible parties got rid of contaminated soil, water, and sludge from this part of the site and filled in the lagoons. Following the clean-up of the lagoons at the site, some drums containing toxic waste were removed from the main landfill to be treated off-site. The landfill was fenced-in and capped in 1997. In addition to these efforts, groundwater monitoring has occurred at and around the Forest Waste Products site since 1993.

The potentially responsible party at this site is Forest Waste Coordinating Committee. In 1993, Michigan entered in an Administrative Order by Consent with the committee to establish their responsibility for reimbursing the state's expenses for oversight at the site. In 1994, the Environmental Protection Agency entered into a Consent Decree with this group. As of 2017, the Environmental Protection Agency, the Michigan Department of Environmental Quality, and the Forest Waste Coordinating Committee agreed on the need for continued sampling and investigation at the site. Forest Waste Products remains on the Environmental Protection Agency's National Priorities List.

== See also ==
- List of Superfund sites in Michigan
