= Michner Plating site =

Michner Plating Site
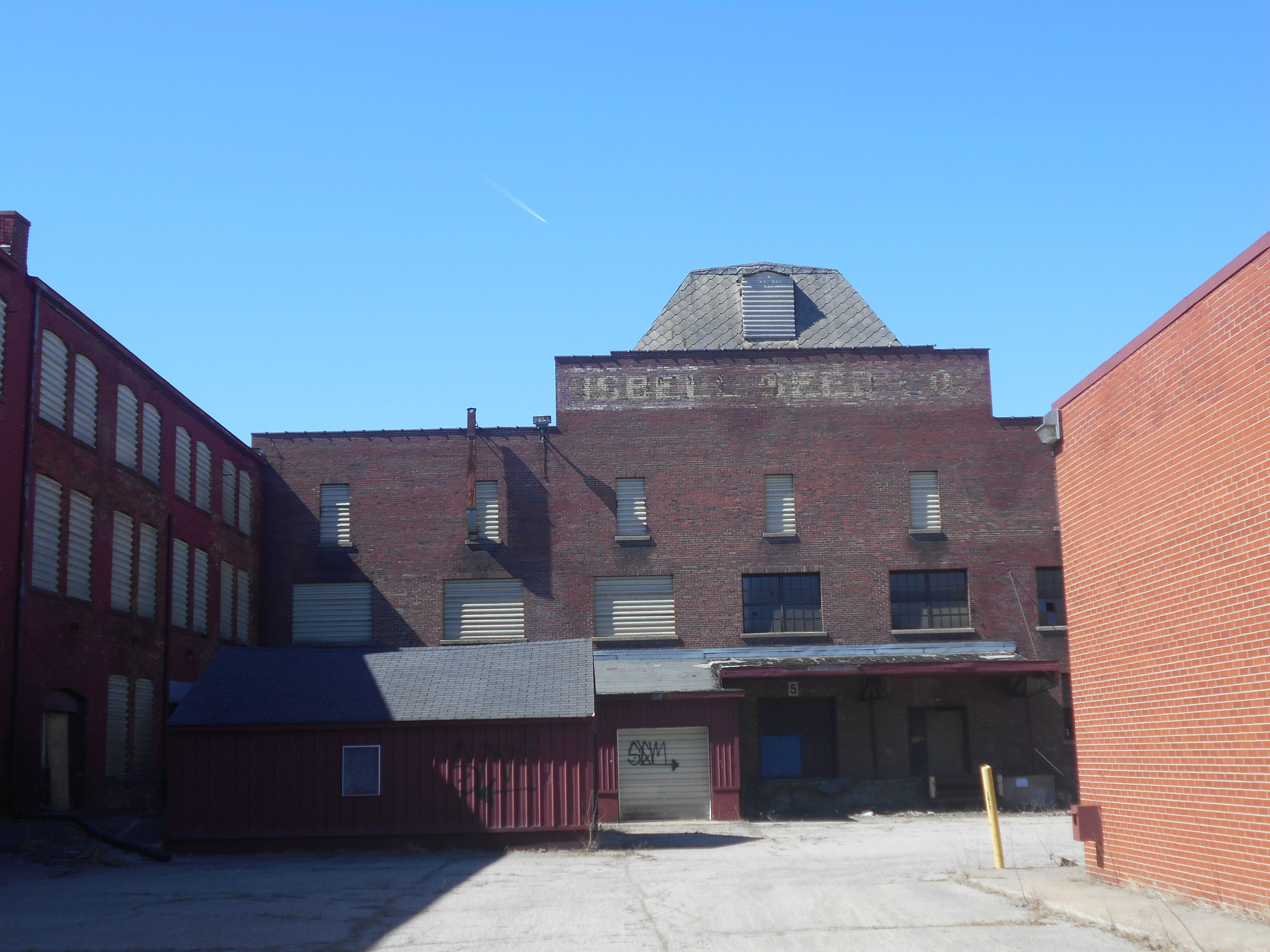
- The Former Isbell Seed Complex, 2019
- Interactive map of the Michner Plating Site area

General information
- Status: Closed, undergoing EPA cleanup; proposed redevelopment
- Type: Mixed Use Industrial
- Location: Jackson, Michigan, U.S.
- Coordinates: 42.253196°N 84.406607°W
- Construction started: 1907
- Completed: 1965

Technical details
- Floor area: 140,000 sq ft (13,000 m^{2})

The Michner Plating Co.–Mechanic Street Site, as dubbed by the EPA, is a 140,000 square foot industrial complex that sits upstream to the Grand River in Jackson, Michigan. on the corner of N. Mechanic Street and W. Trail Street.

== Architecture ==
The first portion of the main structure was completed between 1907 and 1910, three stories, and made out of reinforced concrete. During the site's main expansion in 1920, a new brick-wall, steel-framed, wood-floored building was annexed onto this. A new basement with access doors was added along with that initial expansion movement.

Following this, two new similarly structured buildings were constructed. These extensions, utilizing large attic spaces to trap heat in winter, and shingles to absorb heat in summer. Architecture modernized the plant for agriculture, allowing seeds on the third floor to stay warm in winter during packaging, in which produce was exposed. New boilers were added, and placed in the northern basement.

After being converted to a plating-facility, the open floor plan was used for machinery, mostly the ceiling-mounted conveyor line which wrapped around the first and second floors. New fiberglass was installed over windows on the building, this originally would prevent metal degradation from UV light.

== Isbell's Seeds ==
The very first industrial buildings on this site were constructed in the late 19th and early 20th century; these companies were Weeks Drug & Chemical, Lewis Blessings Cigar & Paper Box, and Novelty Manufacturing.

By 1920 Lewis Blessings and Weeks Drug & Chemicals' property on Mechanic Street had been acquired by S.M. Isbell Seed Co.

Isbell Seed, was Michigan's biggest supplier of agricultural produce, specifically beans at the time. After the acquisition of the buildings, the S.M. Isbell Company preceded in demolition of multiple structures on site, excluding Weeks's three-story storage building. Isbell Seed expanded the Weeks storage building until 1930, when Isbell evidently fell victim to the Great depression.

When looking over that site today viewers are able to observe the original Isbell signs that'd been painted on the building's facade, standing the test of time.

== Michner acquisition ==
In 1935 the three-story complex was purchased by Joseph Michner, in which he would found Michner Plating Corp. The company manufactured and plated automobile parts, particularly seat belts and other small parts. Engraving, heat treating, chrome, and electroplating also made up the bulk of manufacturing that occurred at Michner Plating Co.

The Michner Plating Corporation renovated the Isbell buildings for plating, repainting them with the Michner name, and continue the expansion of the buildings. The company also bought the former Novelty Mfg., site allowing them to expand on the north end of the site.

Michner Adjusts Properties for Reuse:

- 1936: New chrome line building with conveyor access to the former Isbell structures
- 1940s: Northern loading area restructured with more coverage and access
- 1962: Two floor office building and loading room, under new management of Walter Michner
- 1963: Former Isbell Complex sold to SalCo Engineering & Manufacturing
- 1965: Nickel & zinc plating lines expansion, heat treatment machine installed

== Later years ==
After the 1963 site split Michner Plating Co. began receiving numerous OSHA violation notices for their Mechanic St. site, under handling of chemicals and chemical disposal. In 2007 Michner ceased operations at the Mechanic St. site due to diminished returns, as well as competition. This resulted in the relocation all operations to their Angling Rd. property; where Jason Michner would inherit ownership. This site's new vacancy allowed for Michner to salvage metals by cutting pipes, which sparked a small fire in the wood framed roof. Michner Plating Co. later entered foreclosure in 2013 due to $1.6 million unpaid back-taxes.

Site tenant SalCo relocated services to Micor Drive in 2015 following the EPA's investigation; which concluded with the discovery of over '1,100 drums, vats, totes, and other containers potentially containing cyanide, zinc cyanide, nickel chloride, chromic acid, hydrogen peroxide, sulfuric acid, ignitable wastes, reactive wastes and other chemicals'. Groundwater soil tests were also performed across the site for PFAS, outsourcing from a flooded basement used to store industrial materials, a hazard due to its proximity to the Grand River and private wells, achieving a Hazardous Ranking System score of 39.12.

In 2016 the US Nuclear Regulatory Commission inquired about former-tenant Novelty Manufacturing's business in radium isotopes, used in their foot-warmer contraption, which could potentially harm the fragile environment around the facility. In 2018, after performing a radiological survey, the NRC informed the EPA that no such radium isotope contamination had been found during the survey.

=== Current status ===
During the late 2010s the abandoned buildings became a popular spot to vandalize and explore. Due to Jackson County owning the property, the structure does not fall under certain ordinances, such as Jackson's graffiti ordinance.

In 2021 a portion of tar concrete roof in the north building collapsed after years of neglect and weathering. The southern portion that was previously occupied by SalCo took on flooding, as well as infrastructural hazards like falling bricks and roof-paper. The entire Michner Plating Site is currently unsafe for any industrial use, but has been considered for future redevelopment due to the site's strategic location.

The EPA resumed cleanup in 2021, and designated Michner Plating as a Superfund Site; citing numerous barrels containing industrial contaminants, buried within the building's foundation. Jackson County is developing a plan to demolish the building for site reuse by December 2022. Entry points in both buildings have been sealed for the cleanup process to prevent interruption.

In 2025 a 15 year old child confessed to arson, after setting the office wing on fire, fortunately no harmful contamination was released.
