= Michigan Disposal (Cork Street Landfill) =

- Superfund site
- Location within Michigan
- Location: Kalamazoo, Michigan, Kalamazoo, Michigan; 42.258695°N 85.542874°W

Information
- CERCLIS ID: MID000775957
- Contaminants: antimony, aroclor 1254, arsenic, barium, chromium, manganese, arsenic, Polycyclic aromatic hydrocarbons, cadmium, chrysene

Progress

Michigan Disposal Service, also known as Kalamazoo City Dump, Kalamazoo City Landfill, Dispose-O-Waste and the Cork Street Landfill, is a 68-acre (27.5 hectare) Superfund site in Kalamazoo, Michigan. Davis Creek is adjacent to the site. It is one of six Superfund sites in the Kalamazoo River watershed.

The site opened in 1925 as a privately run facility and operated as a dump and incinerator until 1961 when it was purchased by the City of Kalamazoo. In 1981 it was purchased by Dispose-O-Waste, now known as Michigan Disposal Service.

A 1967 Solid Waste plan commissioned by the Kalamazoo County Road Commission, stated that the incinerator had no controls and produced an air pollution problem. Further, the authors state that the County's method for waste disposal creates water pollution and is detrimental to public health and is not in compliance with Michigan Act 87 of 1965.

The EPA Superfund Record of Decision is dated September 30, 1991.

Upon EPA review, the site was found to be leaching antimony, aroclor 1254, arsenic, barium, chromium, and manganese. The sediment was found to contain arsenic, a number of Polycyclic aromatic hydrocarbons, cadmium, and chrysene.
