= 1,1,1-Trichloroethane =

Solvent, now banned for ozone depletion

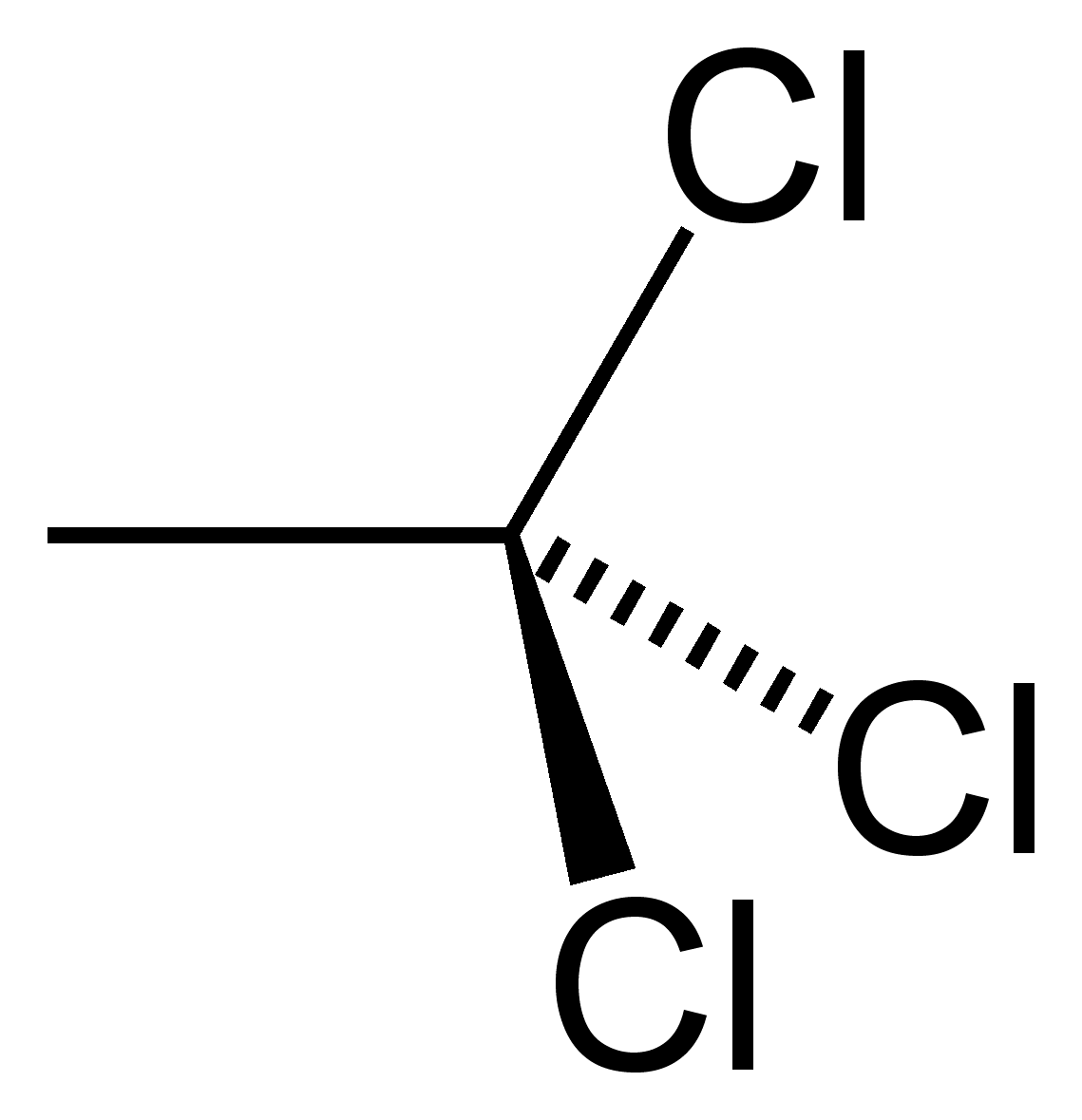
Skeletal formula of 1,1,1-trichloroethane
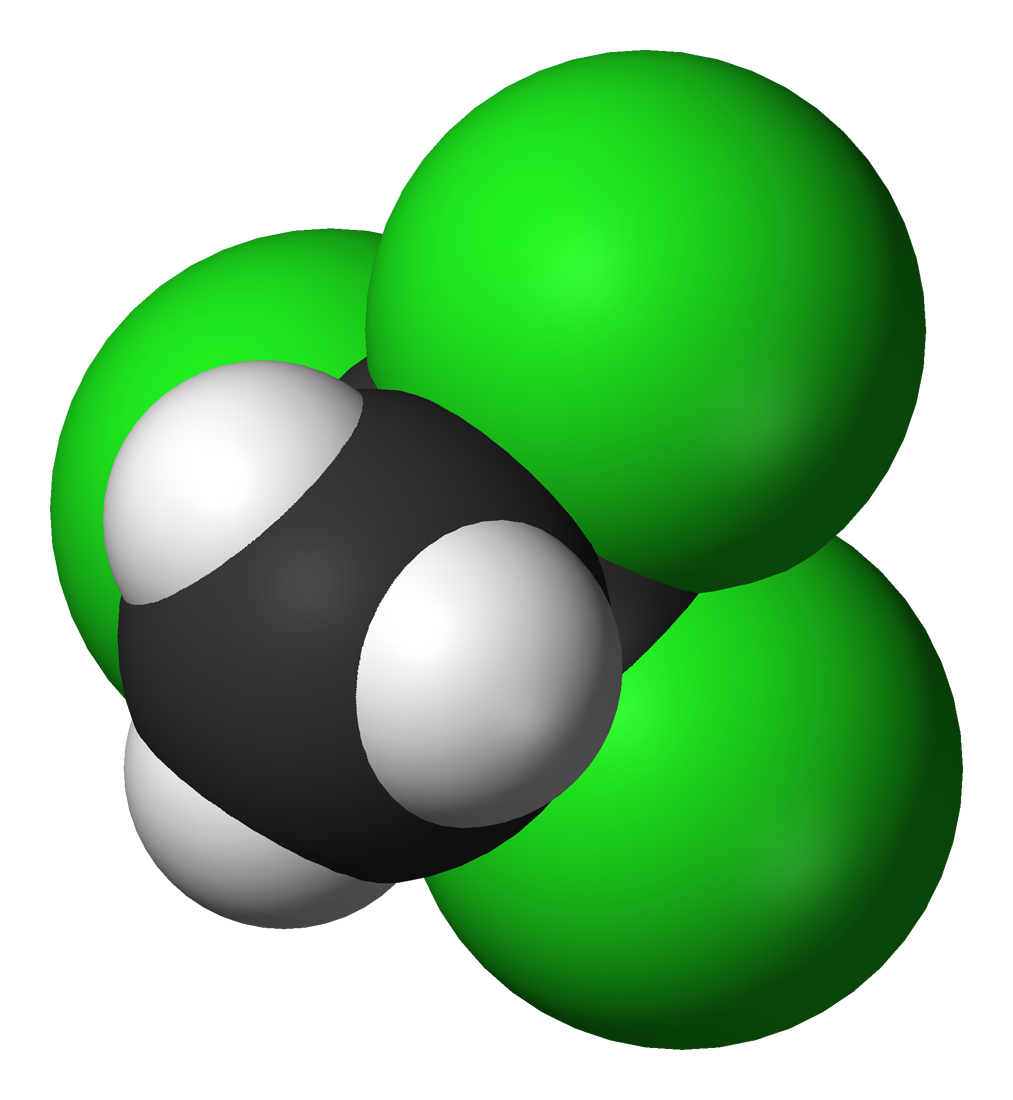
Space-filling model of 1,1,1-trichloroethane

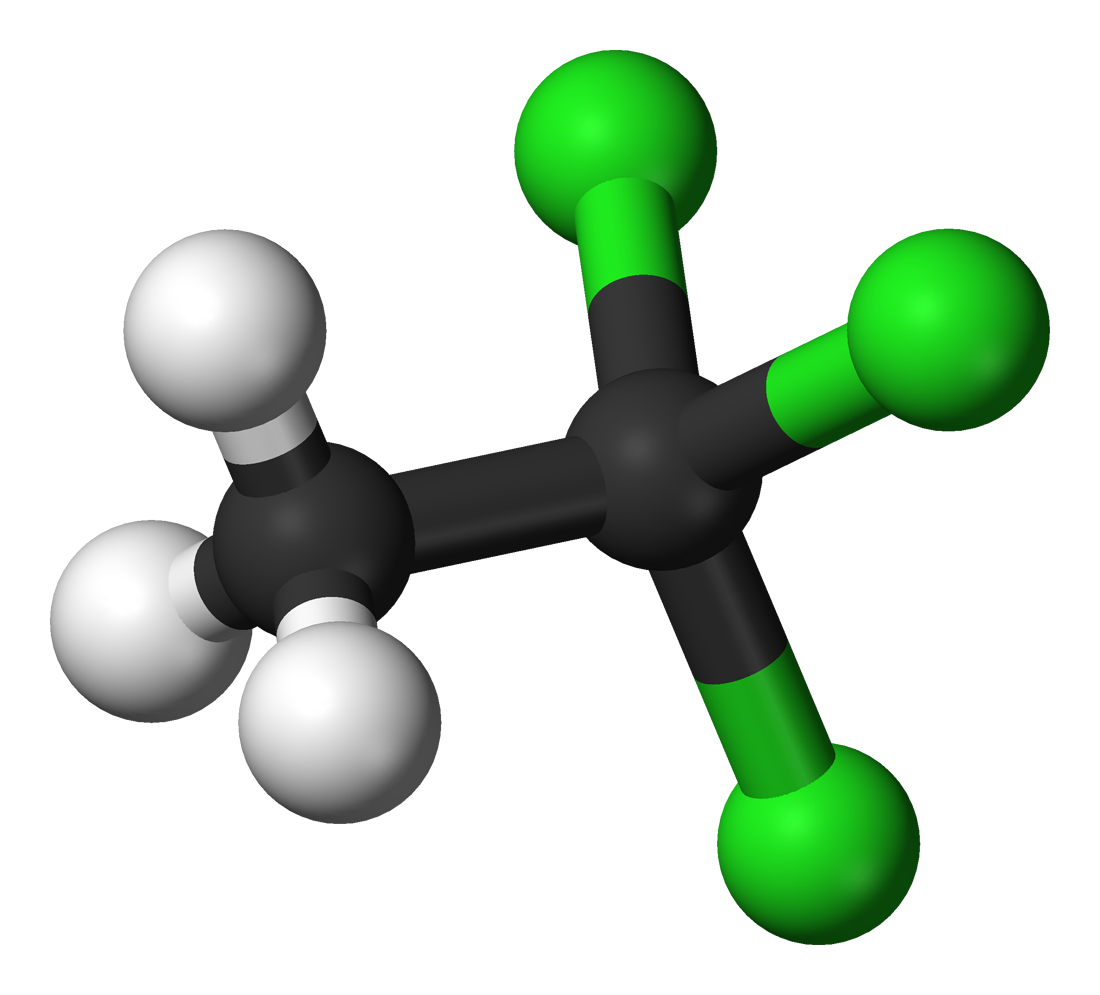

Names
- Preferred IUPAC name 1,1,1-Trichloroethane
- Other names: 1,1,1-TCA; Methyl chloroform; Chlorothene; Solvent 111; R-140a; Genklene; monochlorethylidene chloride (archaic)

Identifiers
CAS Number	71-55-6
3D model (JSmol)	Interactive image
ChEBI	CHEBI:36015
ChEMBL	ChEMBL16080
ChemSpider	6042
ECHA InfoCard	100.000.688
EC Number	200-756-3
Gmelin Reference	82076
IUPHAR/BPS	5482
KEGG	C18246
PubChem CID	6278
RTECS number	KJ2975000
UNII	113C650IR1
UN number	2831
CompTox Dashboard (EPA)	DTXSID0021381
- InChI: InChI=1S/C2H3Cl3/c1-2(3,4)5/h1H3 Key: UOCLXMDMGBRAIB-UHFFFAOYSA-N; InChI=1/C2H3Cl3/c1-2(3,4)5/h1H3 Key: UOCLXMDMGBRAIB-UHFFFAOYAP
- SMILES: ClC(Cl)(Cl)C

Properties
Chemical formula	C_{2}H_{3}Cl_{3} or CH_{3}CCl_{3}
Molar mass	133.40 g·mol^{−1}
Appearance	Colourless liquid
Odor	mild, chloroform-like
Density	1.37 g/cm^{3} (0 °C (32 °F; 273 K)); 1.35 g/cm^{3} (15 °C (59 °F; 288 K)); 1.32 g/cm^{3} (30 °C (86 °F; 303 K))
Melting point	−33 °C (−27 °F; 240 K)
Boiling point	74–76 °C (165–169 °F; 347–349 K)
Solubility in water	0.480 g/L (20 °C (68 °F; 293 K)); reacts slowly producing hydrochloric acid
log P	2.49 (20 °C (68 °F; 293 K))
Vapor pressure	100 mmHg (13 kPa) (20 °C (68 °F; 293 K))
Refractive index (n_{D})	1.437 D
Viscosity	0.86 cP (20 °C (68 °F; 293 K))

Hazards
- GHS labelling
Pictograms	(GHS07: Exclamation mark) (GHS08: Health hazard)
Signal word	Danger
Hazard statements	H332, H350, H402, H420
Precautionary statements	P201, P202, P261, P271, P273, P280, P304+P340+P312, P308+P313, P405, P501, P502
NFPA 704 (fire diamond)	2 1 0
Autoignition temperature	537 °C; 998 °F; 810 K
Explosive limits	7.5%–15%
Threshold limit value (TLV)	350 ppm (1,4-dioxane: 20 ppm, danger of cutaneous absorption) (TWA), 450 ppm (STEL), 350 ppm (1900 mg/m^{3}) (C)
- Lethal dose or concentration (LD, LC)
LD_{50} (median dose)	1,1,1-TCA: 9600 mg/kg (oral, rat); 6000 mg/kg (oral, mouse); 5660 mg/kg (oral, rabbit); 1,4-dioxane (stabilizer): 7600 μL/kg (skin, rabbit)
LC_{50} (median concentration)	3911 mg/kg (mouse, 2 hr); 18,000 ppm (rat, 4 hr)
- NIOSH (US health exposure limits)
PEL (Permissible)	350 ppm (1900 mg/m^{3}, TWA); 1,4-dioxane: 100 ppm (360 mg/m^{3}, TWA, skin)
REL (Recommended)	350 ppm (1900 mg/m^{3}, C); 1,4-dioxane: 1 ppm (3.6 mg/m^{3}, C, potential carcinogen, skin absorption)
IDLH (Immediate danger)	700 ppm
- Except where otherwise noted, data are given for materials in their standard state (at 25 °C [77 °F], 100 kPa). verify (what is ?) Infobox references

1,1,1-Trichloroethane, also known as methyl chloroform and chlorothene, is a chloroalkane with the chemical formula CH_{3}CCl_{3}. It is an isomer of 1,1,2-trichloroethane. A colourless and sweet-smelling liquid, it was once produced industrially in large quantities for use as a solvent. It is regulated by the Montreal Protocol as an ozone-depleting substance, and as such, use has declined since 1996. Trichloroethane should not be confused with the similar-sounding trichloroethene which is also commonly used as a solvent.

== Production ==
1,1,1-Trichloroethane was first reported by Henri Victor Regnault in 1840. Industrially, it is usually produced in a two-step process from vinyl chloride. In the first step, vinyl chloride reacts with hydrogen chloride at 20–50 °C (68–122 °F) to produce 1,1-dichloroethane:

H_{2}C=CHCl + HCl → CH_{3}CHCl_{2}

This reaction is catalyzed by a variety of Lewis acids, mainly aluminium chloride, iron(III) chloride, or zinc chloride. The 1,1-dichloroethane is then converted to 1,1,1-trichloroethane by reaction with chlorine under ultraviolet irradiation:

CH_{3}CHCl_{2} + Cl_{2} → CH_{3}CCl_{3} + HCl

This reaction proceeds at 80%–90% yield, and the hydrogen chloride byproduct can be recycled to the first step in the process. The major side-product is the related compound 1,1,2-trichloroethane, from which the 1,1,1-trichloroethane can be separated by distillation.

A somewhat smaller amount is produced from the reaction of 1,1-dichloroethene and hydrogen chloride in the presence of an iron(III) chloride catalyst:

CH_{2}=CCl_{2} + HCl → CH_{3}CCl_{3}

It is sold with stabilizers because it is unstable with respect to dehydrochlorination and attacks some metals. Stabilizers comprise up to 8% of the formulation, including acid scavengers (epoxides, amines) and complexants. One discontinued product contained only 1,4-dioxane (2%±1%), while another chemical supplier included 2.5% 1,4-dioxane, 0.47% 1,2-butylene oxide, and 0.35% nitromethane as stabilizers.

== Uses ==
1,1,1-Trichloroethane is an excellent solvent for many organic compounds and one of the least toxic of the chlorinated hydrocarbons. It is generally considered non-polar, but owing to the good polarizability of the chlorine atoms, it is a superior solvent for organic compounds that do not dissolve well in hydrocarbons such as hexane. Prior to the Montreal Protocol, it was widely used for cleaning metal parts and circuit boards, as a photoresist solvent in the electronics industry, as an aerosol propellant, as a cutting fluid additive, and as a solvent for inks, paints, adhesives, and other coatings.

It was used to dry-clean leather and suede. Use in dry-cleaning remained until the 1980s. It was used as an insecticidal fumigant.

It was also the standard cleaner for photographic film. Other commonly available solvents damage emulsion and base (acetone will dissolve triacetate base on most films), and thus are not suitable for this application. The standard replacement, Forane 141 is much less effective, and tends to leave a residue. It was also used as a thinner in correction fluid products such as liquid paper.

Many of its applications previously used carbon tetrachloride (which was banned in US consumer products in 1970). In turn, 1,1,1-trichloroethane itself is now being replaced by other solvents in the laboratory. Phase-out of 1,1,1-Trichloroethane due to ozone depletion led to a resurgence of the use of trichloroethylene in metal degreasing.

Methyl chloroform was also used as a veterinary anthelmintic.

In the 1880s, it was found to be a safe and strong anesthetic and a replacement for chloroform but its production was too expensive and difficult for the era.

== Safety ==
Although not as toxic as many similar compounds, inhaled or ingested 1,1,1-trichloroethane acts as a central nervous system depressant and can cause decrease in reaction times and dexterity as well as impaired balance and abnormal EEG at lower concentrations, throat irritation, and in sufficiently high concentrations, death.

The International Agency for Research on Cancer places 1,1,1-trichloroethane in Group 2A as a probable carcinogen.

== Atmospheric concentration ==
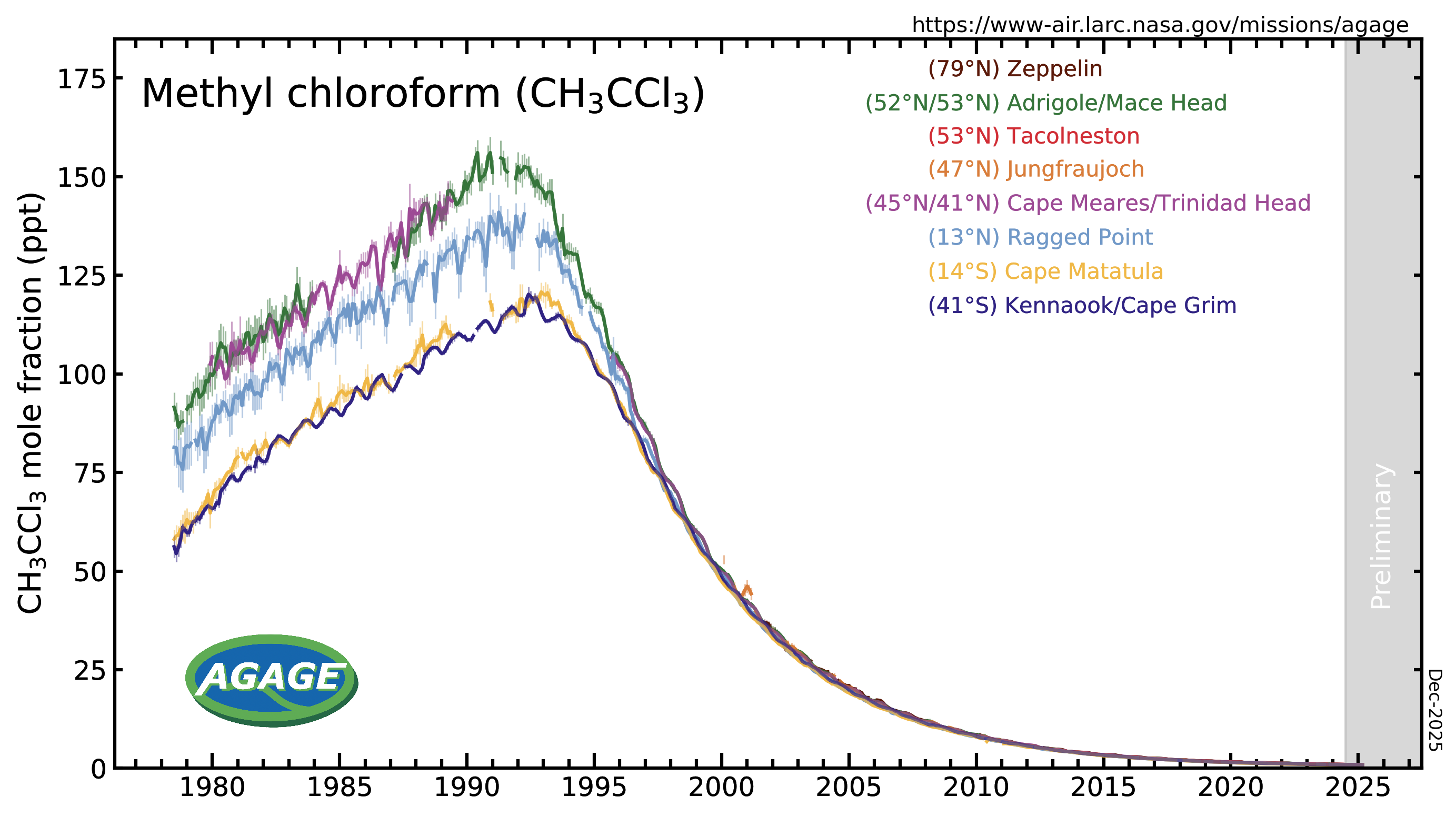
CH_{3}CCl_{3} measured by the Advanced Global Atmospheric Gases Experiment in the lower atmosphere (troposphere) at stations around the world. Abundances are given as pollution free monthly mean mole fractions in parts-per-trillion.

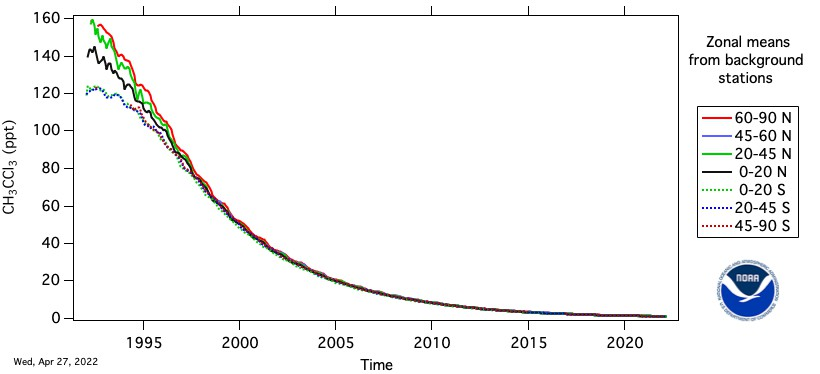
1,1,1-Trichloroethane timeseries at various latitudes.

1,1,1-Trichloroethane is a fairly potent greenhouse gas with a 100-year global warming potential of 169 relative to carbon dioxide. This is nonetheless less than a tenth that of carbon tetrachloride — which it replaced as a solvent — due to its relatively short atmospheric lifetime of about 5 years.

The Montreal Protocol targeted 1,1,1-trichloroethane as a compound responsible for ozone depletion and banned its use beginning in 1996. Since then, its manufacture and use have been phased out throughout most of the world, and its atmospheric concentration has declined substantially.

== See also ==
- 1,1,2-Trichloro-1,2,2-trifluoroethane
