= Ott/Story/Cordova Chemical Co =

Superfund site in Michigan

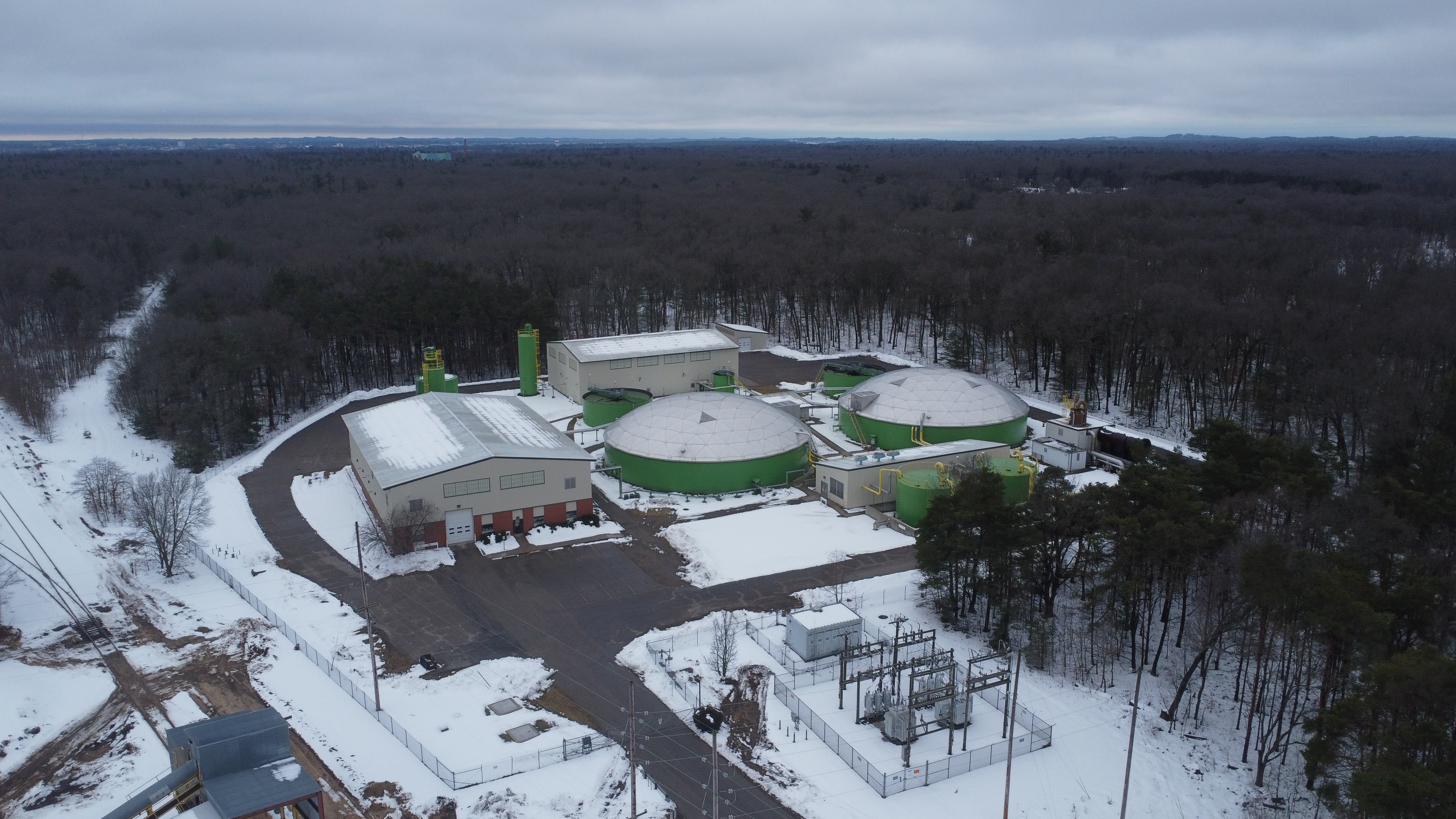
Aerial photo of the Ott/Story/Cordova Superfund site remedy systems.

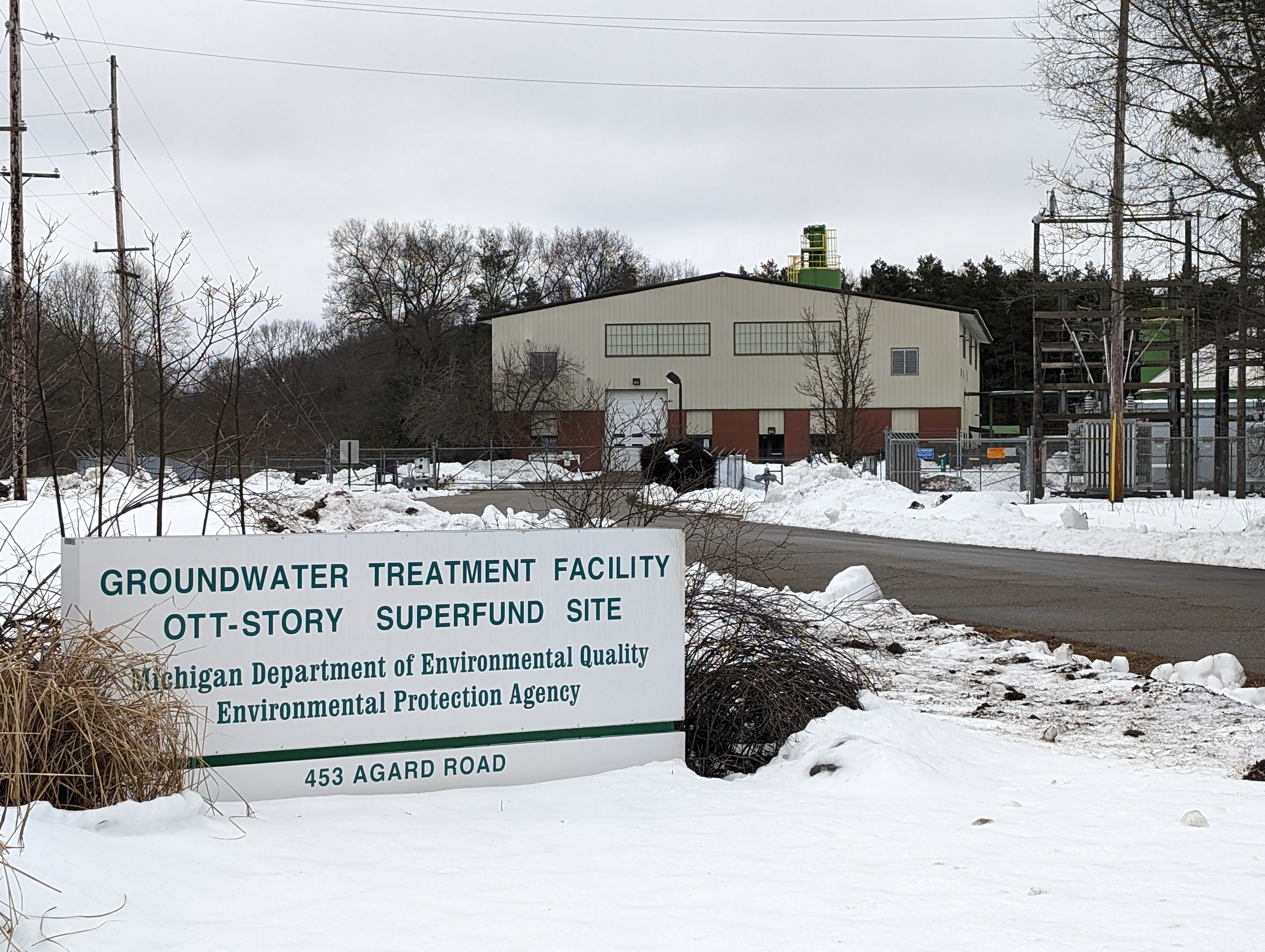
Front gate of the Ott/Story/Cordova Superfund site remedy systems.

The Ott/Story/Cordova Chemical Co. is a 20-acre superfund site that is located in Dalton township in the US State of Michigan.

== History ==
The Ott/Story/Cordova Chemical Co. was founded in 1957 and ran until 1985 under 4 separate owners, from 1957 to 1965, the plant was owned by the "Ott Chemical Company" then "CPC International" bought the plant in 1965 and created a subsidiary to run it. And in 1976 "Story Chemical" bought the plant and ran it into bankruptcy. Then after that In 1977, "Aerojet-General" purchased it through its California subsidiary "Cordova", which set up "Cordova-Michigan."

== Impacts ==
The Ott/Story/Cordova site was contaminated by pharmaceutical, pesticide, and herbicide chemical production under a series of owners from 1957 to 1985. Waste was stored in drums and sludge lagoons. Soil and groundwater was contaminated with over 90 organic chemicals, including benzene, toluene, vinyl chloride, dichloroethane and tetrachloroethene. There was also contamination of groundwater, soils, and nearby Little Bear Creek and its unnamed tributary. Approximately 10,000 drums of waste material, some of which contained phosgene gas, were also stockpiled onsite and had approximately 300 to 500 residents in a one-mile radius of the site.

== Responsibility ==
There is a lot of controversy on who should be held responsible for the damages the site caused, as 2 of the 4 companies that owned it had gone out of business. And it was difficult to put the blame on 1 of the 4 companies, as the damage was done during decades of neglect between the 1950s and 1970s. Eventually, Cleanup for the Ott/Story/Cordova Site was assumed by the Michigan Department of Natural Resources and the United States Environmental Protection Agency.

== Cleanup ==
Water extracted from the ground is put into ‘diffused air stripping tanks’ and treated with phosphoric acid, powdered activated carbon, ferric chloride, sand filtration, and liquid phase Granular Activated Carbon. Air from the diffused air stripping units and the aeration tanks is treated in a thermal oxidation unit before being discharged to the atmosphere. Treated water is transported through piping to a stationary aerator prior to discharge to the Muskegon River. Sludge generated from the biological systems is conditioned and then transported to filter presses before being disposed of as non-hazardous waste.”.

== Current day ==
The Ott/Story/Cordova Chemical Co. currently has a “Hazardous ranking” score of 53.41. And the status of the site is “Completed” which means that All the facilities necessary for cleanup have been built.

A part of the site has been re-purposed and turned into the "Muskegon County Business and Industrial Park" as part of an economic development plan in Muskegon to raise the employment rate.
