= 1,1,2-Trichloroethane =

1,1,2-Trichloroethane
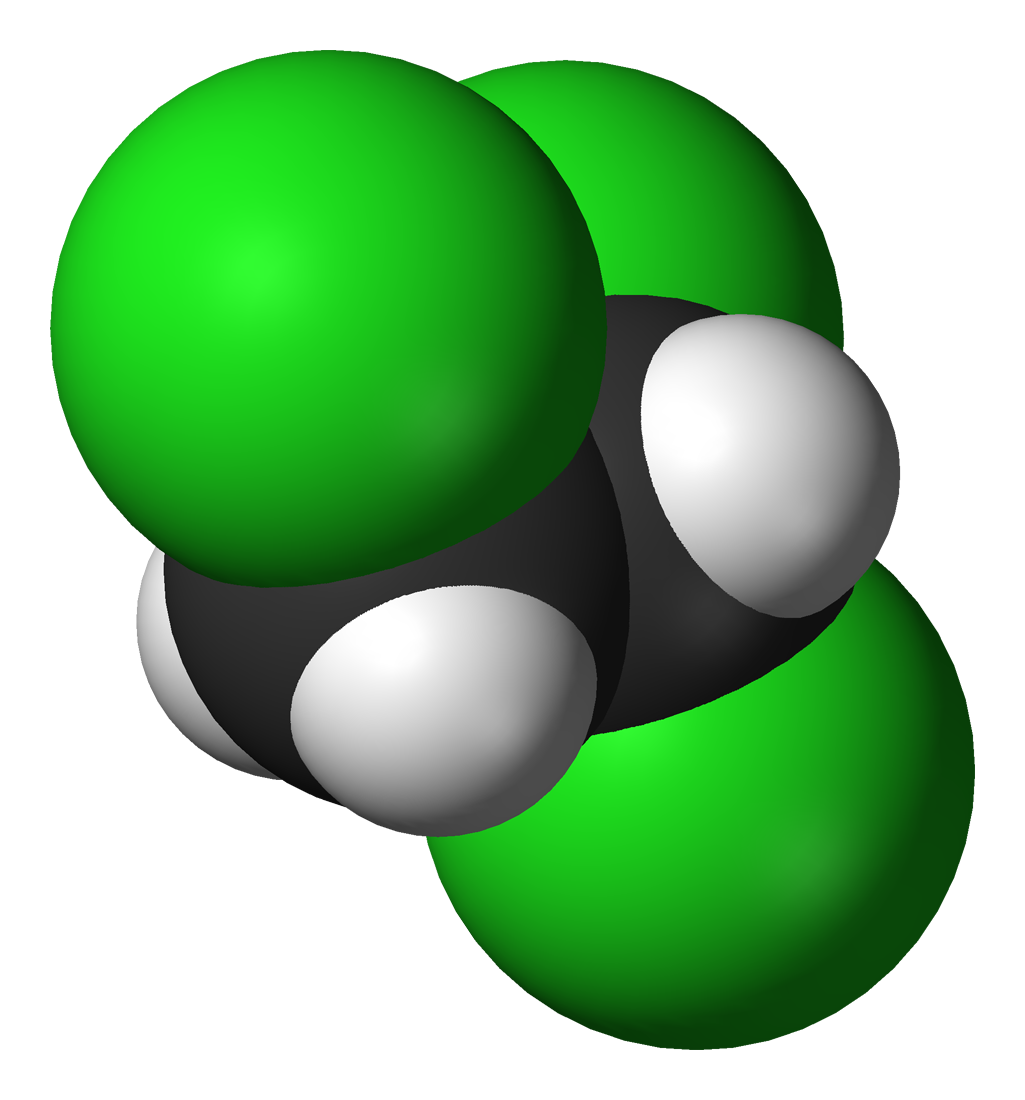

Names
- Preferred IUPAC name 1,1,2-Trichloroethane
- Other names 1,1,2-TCA vinyl trichloride symmetrical Trichloroethane monochlorethylen chloride (archaic)

Identifiers
CAS Number	79-00-5
3D model (JSmol)	Interactive image; Interactive image
ChEBI	CHEBI:36018
ChEMBL	ChEMBL43882
ChemSpider	6326
ECHA InfoCard	100.001.061
KEGG	C19536
PubChem CID	6574
UNII	28E9ERN9WU
CompTox Dashboard (EPA)	DTXSID5021380
- InChI: InChI=1S/C2H3Cl3/c3-1-2(4)5/h2H,1H2 Key: UBOXGVDOUJQMTN-UHFFFAOYSA-N; InChI=1/C2H3Cl3/c3-1-2(4)5/h2H,1H2 Key: UBOXGVDOUJQMTN-UHFFFAOYAA
- SMILES: ClCC(Cl)Cl; C(C(Cl)Cl)Cl

Properties
Chemical formula	C_{2}H_{3}Cl_{3}
Molar mass	133.40 g/mol
Appearance	colorless liquid
Odor	sweet, chloroform-like (in high concentrations)
Density	1.435 g/cm^{3}
Melting point	−37 °C (−35 °F; 236 K)
Boiling point	110 to 115 °C (230 to 239 °F; 383 to 388 K)
Solubility in water	0.4% (20°C)
Vapor pressure	19 mmHg (20°C)

Hazards
NFPA 704 (fire diamond)	3 1
Explosive limits	6–15.5%
- Lethal dose or concentration (LD, LC)
LD_{50} (median dose)	1200 mg/kg (rat, orally)
LC_{Lo} (lowest published)	13,100 mg/m^{3} (cat, 4.5 hr); 2000 ppm (rat, 4 hr)
- NIOSH (US health exposure limits)
PEL (Permissible)	TWA 10 ppm (45 mg/m^{3}) [skin]
REL (Recommended)	Ca TWA 10 ppm (45 mg/m^{3}) [skin]
IDLH (Immediate danger)	Ca [100 ppm]

Related compounds
Related compounds	1,1,1-Trichloroethane; Trichloroethylene
- Except where otherwise noted, data are given for materials in their standard state (at 25 °C [77 °F], 100 kPa). verify (what is ?) Infobox references

1,1,2-Trichloroethane, vinyl trichloride or 1,1,2-TCA, is an organochloride solvent with the molecular formula C_{2}H_{3}Cl_{3} and the structural formula CH_{2}Cl−CHCl_{2}. It is a colourless, sweet-smelling liquid that does not dissolve in water, but is soluble in most organic solvents. It is an isomer of 1,1,1-trichloroethane, and a byproduct of its manufacture.

It is used as a solvent and as an intermediate in the synthesis of 1,1-dichloroethylene.

== Toxicity ==
1,1,2-Trichloroethane may be harmful by inhalation, ingestion, and skin contact. It is a respiratory and eye irritant. 1,1,2-TCA is a central nervous system depressant and inhalation of vapors may cause dizziness, drowsiness, headache, nausea, shortness of breath, and unconsciousness.

The Occupational Safety and Health Administration and National Institute for Occupational Safety and Health have set occupational exposure limits to 1,1,2-trichloroethane at 10 ppm over an eight-hour time-weighted average.
