= 1,2-Dichloroethylene =

Skeletal formula of cis-1,2-dichloroethene
Skeletal formula of trans-1,2-dichloroethene
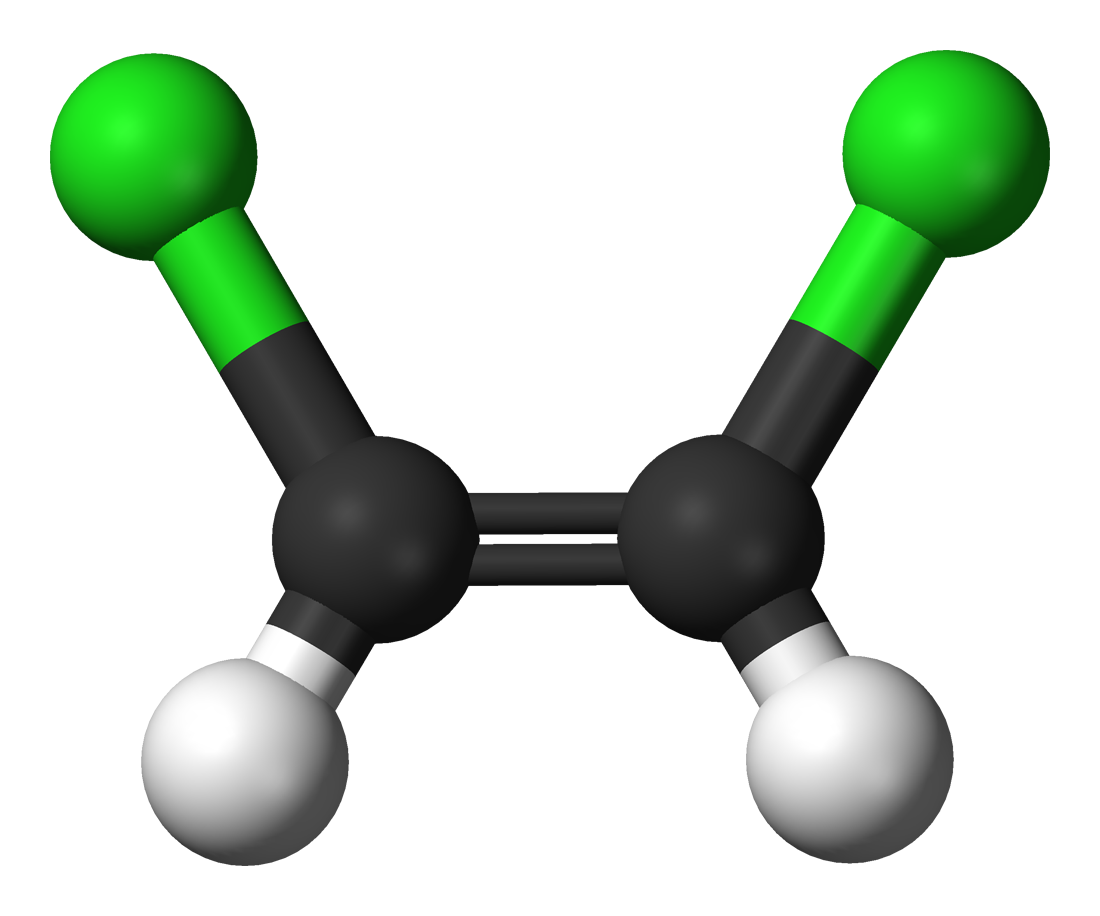
Ball-and-stick model of cis-1,2-dichloroethene
cis-1,2-Dichloroethene (Z)
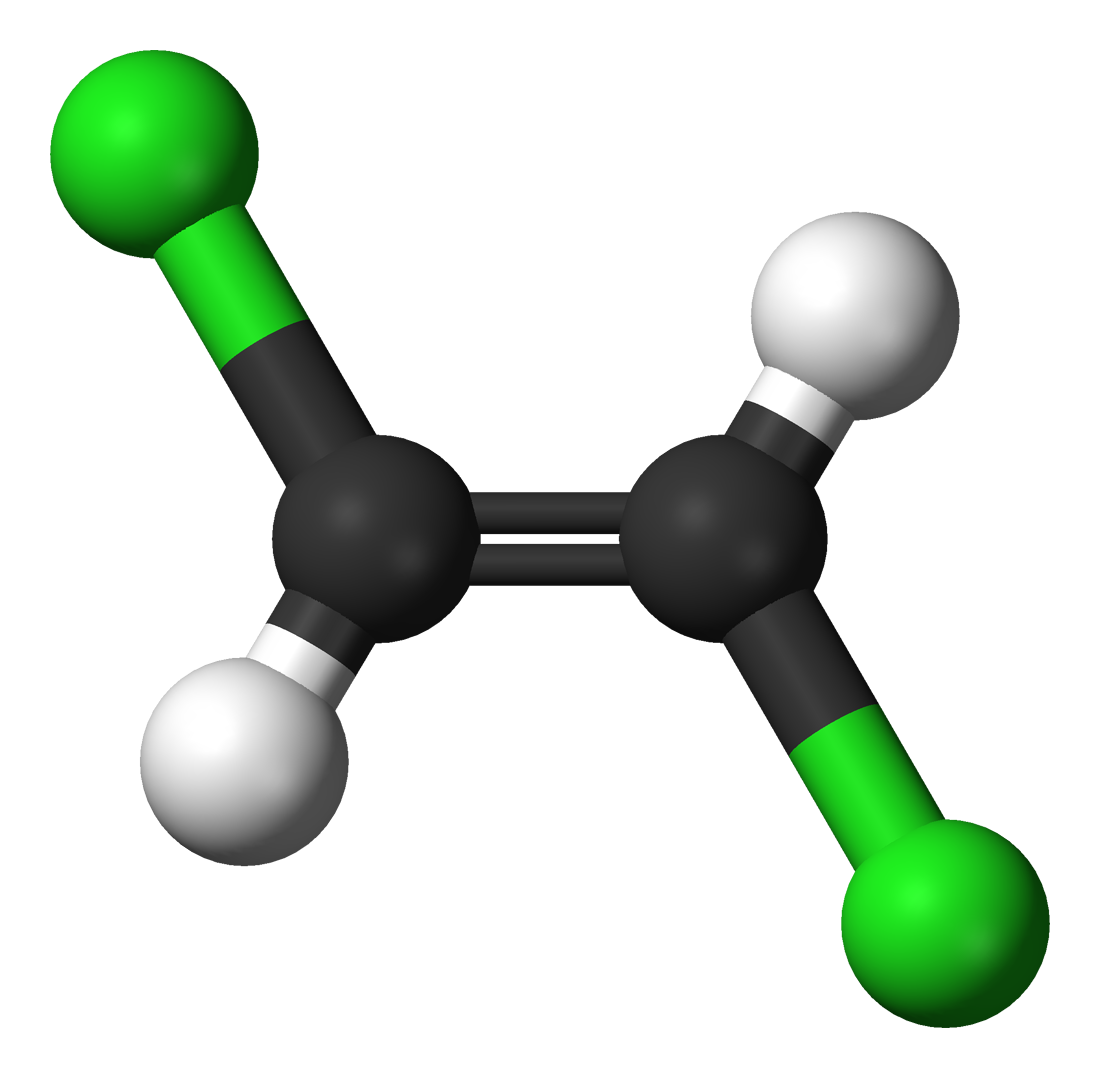
Ball-and-stick model of trans-1,2-dichloroethene
trans-1,2-Dichloroethene (E)

Names
- Preferred IUPAC name 1,2-Dichloroethene
- Other names 1,2-Dichloroethene; 1,2-DCE; Acetylene dichloride sym-Dichloroethylene

Identifiers
CAS Number	156-59-2 (Z); 156-60-5 (E); 540-59-0 (E/Z)
3D model (JSmol)	Interactive image; Interactive image
ChEBI	CHEBI:18882
ChemSpider	10438
ECHA InfoCard	100.007.956
EC Number	208-750-2
KEGG	C06792
PubChem CID	643833 (Z); 638186 (E); 10900 (E/Z)
UNII	FYO9G15JYD (Z); 41799BI61U (E); XU9RUA6YUT (E/Z)
CompTox Dashboard (EPA)	DTXSID8024991
- InChI: InChI=1S/C2H2Cl2/c3-1-2-4/h1-2H Key: KFUSEUYYWQURPO-UHFFFAOYSA-N; InChI=1/C2H2Cl2/c3-1-2-4/h1-2H/b2-1- Key: KFUSEUYYWQURPO-UPHRSURJBI; InChI=1/C2H2Cl2/c3-1-2-4/h1-2H Key: KFUSEUYYWQURPO-UHFFFAOYAW
- SMILES: Cl[C@H]=CCl; ClC=CCl

Properties
Chemical formula	C_{2}H_{2}Cl_{2}
Molar mass	96.94 g·mol^{−1}
Appearance	colorless liquid
Odor	sweet
Density	Z: 1.28 g/cm^{3} E: 1.26 g/cm^{3}
Melting point	Z: −81.47 °C; E: −49.44 °C
Boiling point	Z: 60.2 °C; E: 48.5 °C
Magnetic susceptibility (χ)	−51.0·10^{−6} cm^{3}/mol (cis); −48.9·10^{−6} cm^{3}/mol (trans)
Dipole moment	Z: 1.9 D E: 0 D

Hazards
Flash point	2–4 °C; 36–39 °F; 275–277 K
Explosive limits	5.6–12.8%
- Lethal dose or concentration (LD, LC)
LD_{50} (median dose)	770 mg/kg (oral, rat); 1275 mg/kg (oral, rat, trans-isomer)
LC_{50} (median concentration)	21,273 ppm (mouse, 6 hr, trans-isomer)
LC_{Lo} (lowest published)	16,000 ppm (rat, 6 hr, cis-isomer)
- NIOSH (US health exposure limits)
PEL (Permissible)	TWA 200 ppm (790 mg/m^{3})
REL (Recommended)	TWA 200 ppm (790 mg/m^{3})
IDLH (Immediate danger)	1000 ppm
- Except where otherwise noted, data are given for materials in their standard state (at 25 °C [77 °F], 100 kPa). verify (what is ?) Infobox references

1,2-Dichloroethylene (1,2-DCE) is a pair of organochlorine compounds with the molecular formula C_{2}H_{2}Cl_{2}. The two compounds are isomers, each being colorless liquids with a sweet odor. It can exist as either of two geometric isomers, cis-1,2-dichloroethene or trans-1,2-dichloroethene, but is often used as a mixture of the two. They have modest solubility in water. These compounds have some applications as a degreasing solvent. In contrast to most cis-trans compounds, the Z isomer (cis) is more stable than the E isomer (trans) by 0.4 kcal/mol.

== Production, uses and reactions ==
cis-DCE, the Z isomer, is obtainable by the controlled chlorination of acetylene:

C_{2}H_{2} + Cl_{2} → C_{2}H_{2}Cl_{2}

Industrially both isomers arise as byproducts of the production of vinyl chloride, which is produced on a vast scale. Unlike 1,1-dichloroethylene, the 1,2-dichloroethylene isomers do not polymerize.

trans-1,2-DCE has applications including electronics cleaning, precision cleaning, and certain metal cleaning applications.

Both isomers participate in Kumada coupling reactions. trans-1,2-Dichloroethylene participates in cycloaddition reactions.

== Safety and environmental concerns ==
These compounds have "moderate oral toxicity to rats".

The dichloroethylene isomers occur in some polluted waters and soils, as the decomposition products of trichloroethylene. Significant attention has been paid to their further degradation, e.g. by iron particles.

== See also ==
- 1,1-Dichloroethene
- 1,2-Dichloroethane, which is also often abbreviated as 1,2-DCE
