= 1,1-Dichloroethylene =

Structural formula
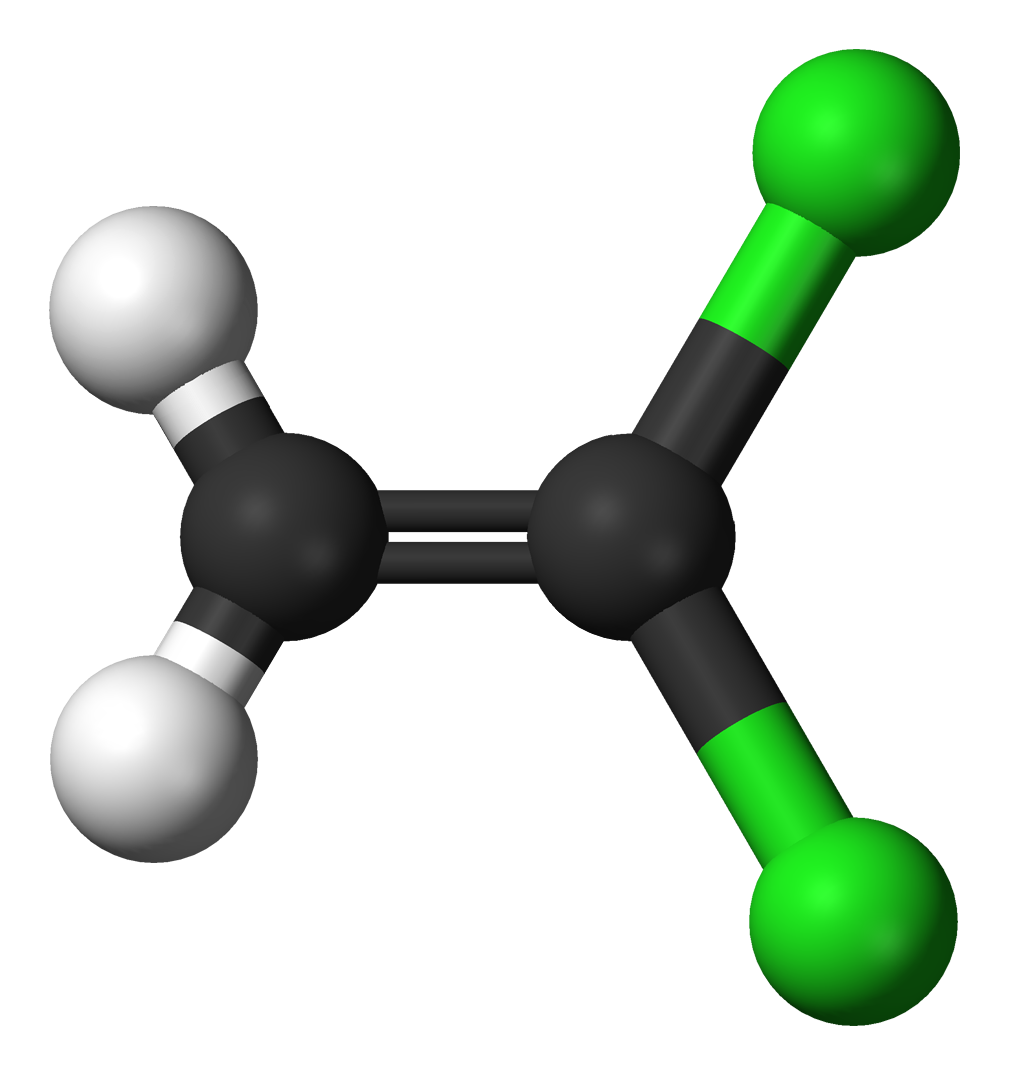
Ball-and-stick model

Names
- Preferred IUPAC name 1,1-Dichloroethene
- Other names 1,1-Dichloroethylene; 1,1-DCE; Vinylidene chloride Vinylidene dichloride Asymmetrical dichloroethene

Identifiers
CAS Number	75-35-4
3D model (JSmol)	Interactive image
ChEBI	CHEBI:34031
ChemSpider	6126
ECHA InfoCard	100.000.786
KEGG	C14039
PubChem CID	6366
UNII	21SK105J9D
CompTox Dashboard (EPA)	DTXSID8021438
- InChI: InChI=1S/C2H2Cl2/c1-2(3)4/h1H2 Key: LGXVIGDEPROXKC-UHFFFAOYSA-N
- SMILES: ClC(Cl)=C

Properties
Chemical formula	C_{2}H_{2}Cl
Molar mass	61.49 g·mol^{−1}
Density	1.213 g/cm^{3}
Melting point	−122 °C (−188 °F; 151 K)
Boiling point	32 °C (90 °F; 305 K)
Solubility in water	2,240mg/L (25 °C)
Vapor pressure	500 mmHg (20 °C)
Magnetic susceptibility (χ)	−49.2·10^{-6} cm^{3}/mol
Dipole moment	1.3 D

Structure
Point group	C_{2v}
Molecular shape	Planar

Hazards
NFPA 704 (fire diamond)	2 4 2
Flash point	−22.8 °C (−9.0 °F; 250.3 K)
Explosive limits	6.5–15.5%
- Lethal dose or concentration (LD, LC)
LD_{Lo} (lowest published)	1500 mg/kg (rat); 194 mg/kg (mouse)
LC_{Lo} (lowest published)	200 ppm (rat, 4.1 hr); 98 ppm (mouse, 22–23 hr); 1,000 ppm (rat, 2.4 hr)
- NIOSH (US health exposure limits)
PEL (Permissible)	none
REL (Recommended)	Ca
IDLH (Immediate danger)	Ca [N.D.]
- Except where otherwise noted, data are given for materials in their standard state (at 25 °C [77 °F], 100 kPa). verify (what is ?) Infobox references

1,1-Dichloroethylene, commonly called vinylidene chloride or 1,1-DCE, is an organochloride with the molecular formula CCl_{2}CH_{2}. It is a colorless liquid with a sharp odor. Like most chlorocarbons, it is poorly soluble in water but soluble in organic solvents. 1,1-DCE was the precursor to the original clingwrap, Saran, for food, but this application has been phased out.

== Production ==
1,1-DCE is produced by dehydrochlorination of 1,1,2-trichloroethane, a relatively unwanted byproduct in the production of 1,1,1-trichloroethane and 1,2-dichloroethane. The conversion is a base-catalyzed reaction which uses either NaOH or Ca(OH)_{2} with temperature ca. 100 °C.

Cl_{2}CHCH_{2}Cl + NaOH → Cl_{2}C=CH_{2} + NaCl + H_{2}O

The gas phase reaction, without the base, would be more desirable but is less selective.

== Applications ==
1,1-DCE is mainly used as a comonomer in the polymerization of vinyl chloride, acrylonitrile, and acrylates. It is also used in semiconductor device fabrication for growing high purity silicon dioxide (SiO_{2}) films.

=== Polyvinylidene chloride ===
As with many other alkenes or substituted alkenes, 1,1-DCE can be polymerised to form polyvinylidene chloride. A very widely used product, cling wrap, or Saran was made from this polymer. During the 1990s research suggested that, in common with many chlorinated carbon compounds, Saran posed a possible danger to health by leaching, especially on exposure to food in microwave ovens. Accordingly, SC Johnson changed their formulation of Saran Wrap in 2004 to a form of polyethylene.

== Safety ==
The health effects from exposure to vinylidene chloride are primarily on the central nervous system, including symptoms of sedation, inebriation, convulsions, spasms, and unconsciousness at high concentrations.

International Agency for Research on Cancer has put vinylidene chloride in Class 2B, meaning possibly carcinogenic to humans. National Institute for Occupational Safety and Health considers vinylidene chloride a potential occupational carcinogen.

== See also ==
- 1,2-Dichloroethene
- Dichloroethane
