= 1,1-Dichloroethane =

1,1-Dichloroethane
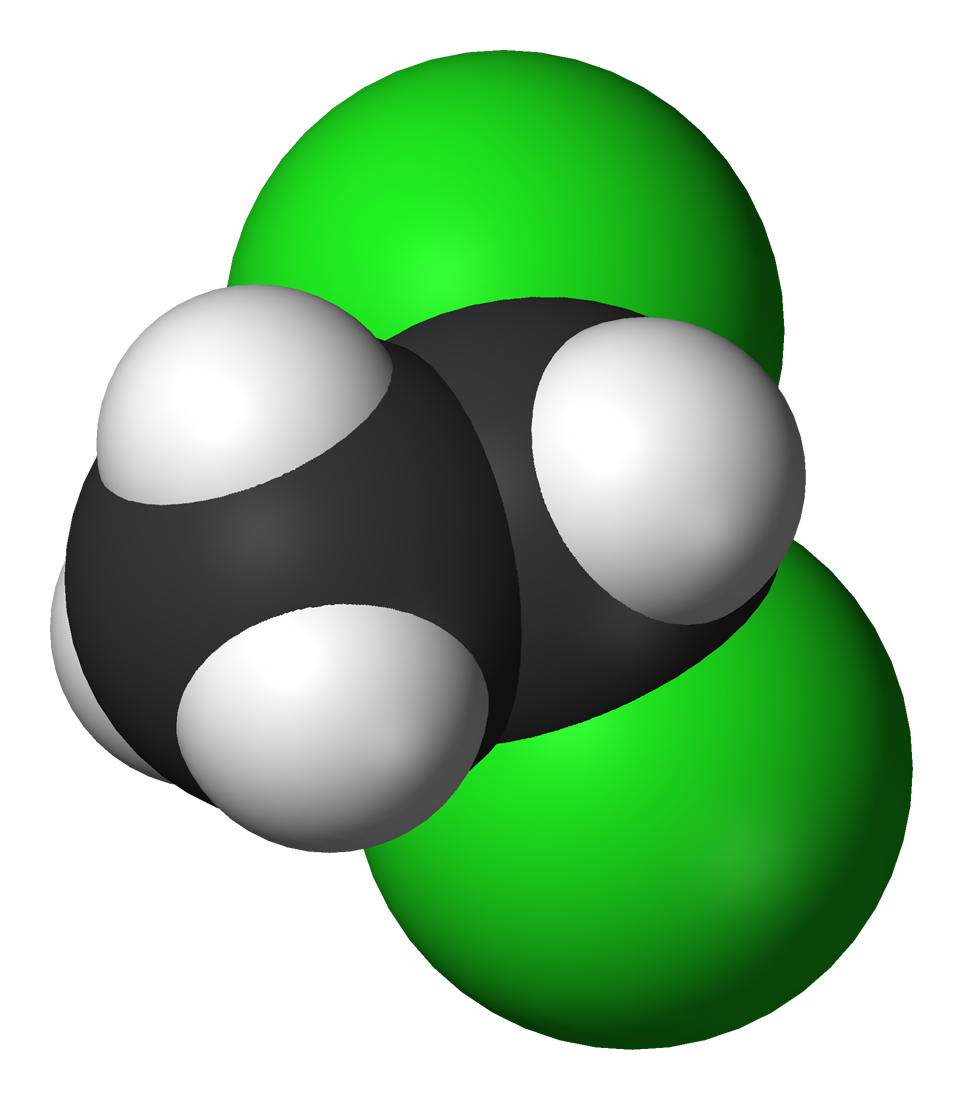

Names
- Preferred IUPAC name 1,1-Dichloroethane
- Other names Ethylidene dichloride Ethylidene chloride Ethidene dichloride CFC-150a; 1,1-DCA; Asymmetrical dichloroethane 1,1-Ethylidene dichloride Asymmetric dichloroethane

Identifiers
CAS Number	75-34-3
3D model (JSmol)	Interactive image
ChEMBL	ChEMBL45079
ChemSpider	6125
ECHA InfoCard	100.000.785
KEGG	C18247
PubChem CID	6365
UNII	0S989LNA44
CompTox Dashboard (EPA)	DTXSID1020437
- InChI: InChI=1S/C2H4Cl2/c1-2(3)4/h2H,1H3 Key: SCYULBFZEHDVBN-UHFFFAOYSA-N; InChI=1/C2H4Cl2/c1-2(3)4/h2H,1H3 Key: SCYULBFZEHDVBN-UHFFFAOYAY
- SMILES: ClC(Cl)C

Properties
Chemical formula	C_{2}H_{4}Cl_{2}
Molar mass	98.95 g·mol^{−1}
Appearance	colorless, oily liquid
Odor	chloroform-like
Density	1.2 g/cm^{3}
Melting point	−97 °C (−143 °F; 176 K)
Boiling point	57.2 °C (135.0 °F; 330.3 K)
Solubility in water	0.6%
Vapor pressure	182 mmHg (20°C)
Magnetic susceptibility (χ)	−57.4·10^{−6} cm^{3}/mol

Hazards
Flash point	−17 °C; 2 °F; 256 K
Explosive limits	5.4–11.4%
- NIOSH (US health exposure limits)
PEL (Permissible)	TWA 100 ppm (400 mg/m^{3})
REL (Recommended)	TWA 100 ppm (400 mg/m^{3})
IDLH (Immediate danger)	3000 ppm

Related compounds
Related compounds	1,2-Dichloroethane (ethylene dichloride); *1,1-Dichloroethene
- Except where otherwise noted, data are given for materials in their standard state (at 25 °C [77 °F], 100 kPa). verify (what is ?) Infobox references

1,1-Dichloroethane is a chlorinated hydrocarbon. It is a colorless oily liquid with a chloroform-like odor. It is not easily soluble in water, but miscible with most organic solvents.

Large volumes of 1,1-dichloroethane are manufactured, with annual production exceeding 1 million pounds in the United States. It is mainly used as a feedstock in chemical synthesis, chiefly of 1,1,1-trichloroethane. It is also used as a solvent for plastics, oils and fats, as a degreaser, as a fumigant in insecticide sprays, in halon fire extinguishers, and in cementing of rubber. It is used in manufacturing of high-vacuum resistant rubber and for extraction of temperature-sensitive substances. Thermal cracking at 400–500 °C and 10 MPa yields vinyl chloride. In the past, 1,1-dichloroethane was used as a surgical inhalational anesthetic.

== Safety ==
In the atmosphere, 1,1-dichloroethane decomposes with half-life of 62 days, chiefly by reaction of photolytically produced hydroxyl radicals.

== See also ==
- Dichloromethane
- Dichloroethene
- 1,2-Dichloroethane
