= Tetrachloro-1,2-difluoroethane =

Names
- IUPAC name 1,1,2,2-tetrachloro-1,2-difluoroethane
- Other names 1,1,2,2-Tetrachloro-1,2-difluoroethane; 1,2-Difluorotetrachloroethane; Freon 112; 1,2-Difluoro-1,1,2,2-tetrachloroethane; ; sym-Tetrachlorodifluoroethane; R 112; CFC-112; 1,1,2,2-Tetrachlorodifluoroethane;

Identifiers
CAS Number	76-12-0
3D model (JSmol)	Interactive image
ChEMBL	ChEMBL3186694
ChemSpider	6187
ECHA InfoCard	100.000.851
EC Number	200-935-6
PubChem CID	6427
RTECS number	KI1420000
UNII	H155PU1V8F
UN number	1078
CompTox Dashboard (EPA)	DTXSID5026091
- InChI: InChI=1S/C2Cl4F2/c3-1(4,7)2(5,6)8 Key: UGCSPKPEHQEOSR-UHFFFAOYSA-N
- SMILES: C(C(F)(Cl)Cl)(F)(Cl)Cl

Properties
Chemical formula	C_{2}Cl_{4}F_{2}
Molar mass	203.82 g·mol^{−1}
Appearance	clear liquid or white solid
Density	1.634 g/mL
Melting point	23.8 °C (74.8 °F; 296.9 K)
Boiling point	92.8 °C (199.0 °F; 365.9 K)
Solubility in water	0.012%
Refractive index (n_{D})	1.4130

Hazards
- GHS labelling
Pictograms	(GHS07: Exclamation mark)
Signal word	Warning
Hazard statements	H315, H320
Precautionary statements	P264, P264+P265, P280, P302+P352, P305+P351+P338, P321, P332+P317, P337+P317, P362+P364

Related compounds
Related compounds	CFC-112a
- Except where otherwise noted, data are given for materials in their standard state (at 25 °C [77 °F], 100 kPa). Infobox references

Tetrachloro-1,2-difluoroethane is a chlorofluorocarbon known as Freon 112, CFC-112 or R-112. It has a symmetrical structure CCl_{2}FCCl_{2}F and so can be called symmetrical tetrachlorodifluoroethane. "Symmetrical" may also be abbreviated to "s-" or "sym-". In contrast an asymmetrical isomer has formula CCl_{3}CClF_{2}.

== Production ==
CFC-112 can be made in a reaction of hexachloroethane or tetrachloroethane with hydrogen fluoride and extra chlorine. This reaction is catalysed by aluminium fluoride with some extra iron, nickel and chromium at 400°C. The extra metal in the catalyst yields can be 98% compared with the unsymmetrical isomer.

Mixed with perfluorooctane, it is a solvent for polydimethylsiloxane.

CFC-112 can be prepared as a mixture with other hydrochlorofluorocarbons from trichloroethylene and anhydrous hydrogen fluoride when electric current is passed through.

Another method involves addition of fluorine to the double bond in tetrachloroethylene by lead tetrafluoride:

CCl_{2}=CCl_{2} + PbF_{4} → CCl_{2}F−CCl_{2}F + PbF_{2}

When CFC-11 is packaged with alcohol in a metal container, a free radical reaction can result in production of CFC-112.

== Properties ==
Critical properties are critical temperature 278°C, critical pressure 4.83 MPa at a density of 0.754 g/cc.

Tetrachloro-1,2-difluoroethane is not flammable.

Tetrachloro-1,2-difluoroethane, like other chlorofluorocarbon compounds reacts violently with sodium, potassium or barium.

Tetrachloro-1,2-difluoroethane is not very toxic, and the lethal dose is estimated at 25 g/kg. It is not carcinogenic.

== Use ==
Tetrachlorodifluoroethane (mixture of isomers) has been used as a veterinary medicine to treat parasites such as liver fluke in sheep (Fasciola hepatica).

MIL-C-8638 is a military specification for a cleaning solvent that contained tetrachlorodifluoroethane, trichlorotrifluoroethane, and isopropyl alcohol. It was used to clean aircraft oxygen systems.

Tetrachlorodifluoroethane can be used as an intermediate in the manufacture of tetrachloroethylene.

== Atmosphere ==
In the atmosphere of Earth, anthropogenic tetrachloro-1,2-difluoroethane has been found to occur. Between 2017 and 2020 levels, were about 0.52 parts per trillion (ppt). Levels rose from the 1970s until about 1995.

== Gallery ==
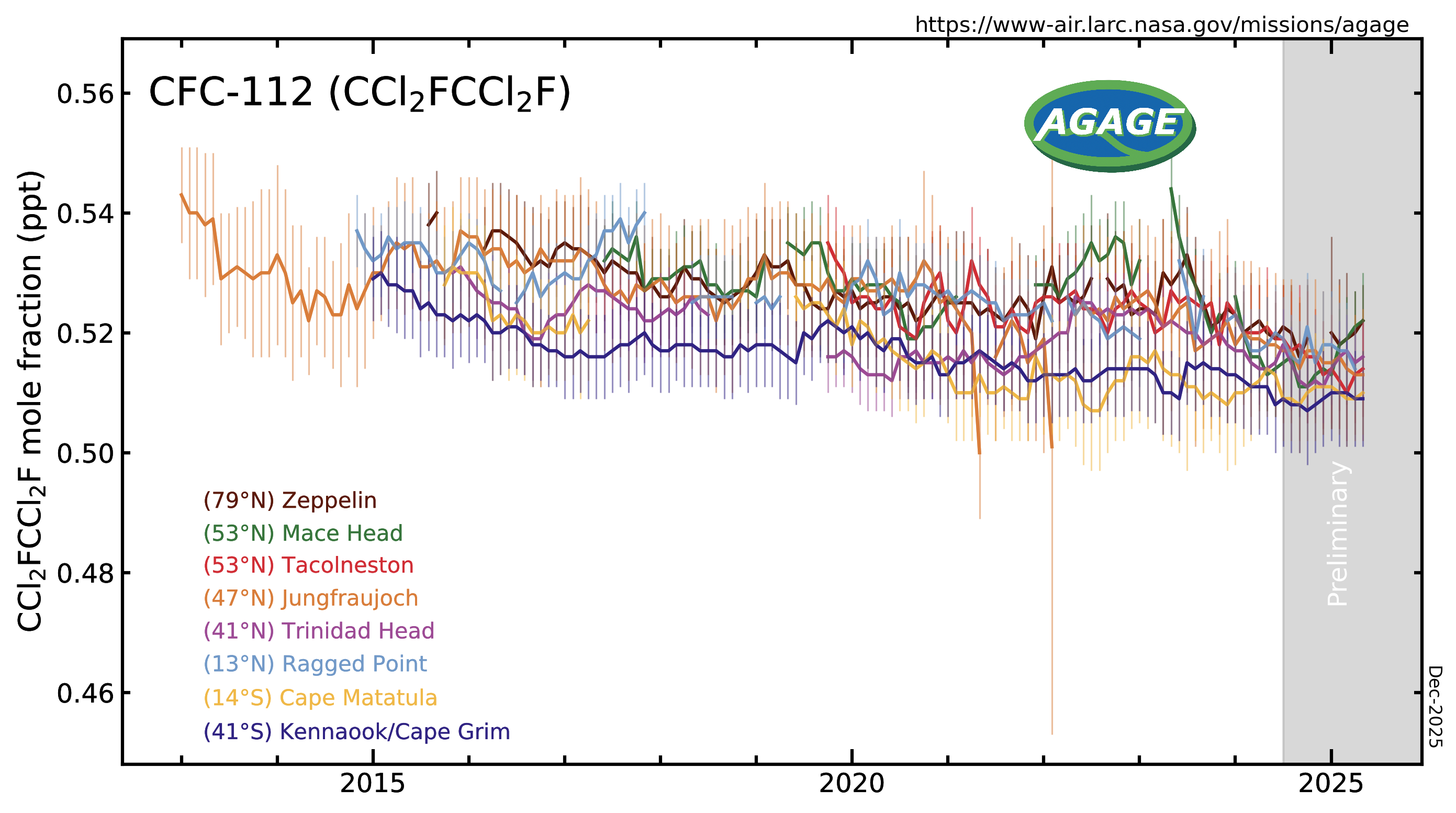
CFC-112 measured by the Advanced Global Atmospheric Gases Experiment (AGAGE) in the lower atmosphere (troposphere) at stations around the world. Abundances are given as pollution free monthly mean mole fractions in parts-per-trillion.
