= Diiodoethane =

Diiodoethane may refer to:

- 1,1-Diiodoethane
- 1,2-Diiodoethane
