= C2Cl4O =

The molecular formula C_{2}Cl_{4}O may refer to:

- Tetrachloroethylene oxide
- Trichloroacetyl chloride
