= C2H4I2 =

The molecular formula C_{2}H_{4}I_{2} (molar mass: 281.86 g/mol, exact mass: 281.8402 u) may refer to:

- 1,1-Diiodoethane
- 1,2-Diiodoethane
