= Tetraiodoethylene =

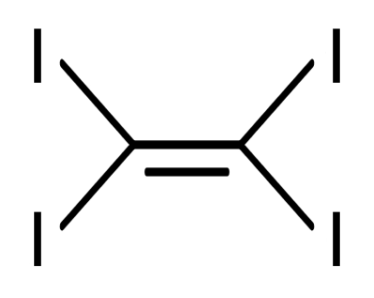

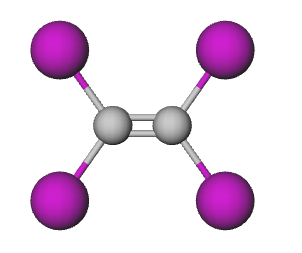

Names
- IUPAC name Tetraiodoethene
- Other names: Periodoethylene; Periodoethene; Diiodoform; Ethylene tetraiodide

Identifiers
| CAS Number | 513-92-8 |
| 3D model (JSmol) | Interactive image |
| ChEMBL | ChEMBL3182626 |
| ChemSpider | 10126 |
| ECHA InfoCard | 100.007.434 |
| EC Number | 208-176-2 |
| PubChem CID | 10568 |
| UNII | K9R00J32Z7 |
| CompTox Dashboard (EPA) | DTXSID4042462 |
- InChI: InChI=1S/C2I4/c3-1(4)2(5)6 Key: ZGQURDGVBSSDNF-UHFFFAOYSA-N
- SMILES: C(=C(I)I)(I)I

Properties
| Chemical formula | C_{2}I_{4} |
| Molar mass | 531.640 g·mol^{−1} |
| Appearance | yellow crystalline solid |
| Odor | Odourless |
| Density | 2.98 g/cm^{3} |
| Melting point | 187–192 °C (369–378 °F; 460–465 K) |
| Boiling point | Sublimates |
| Solubility in water | Insoluble |
| Solubility | Soluble in chloroform, carbon disulphide, benzene and toluene, sparingly soluble in ether |

Hazards
- GHS labelling
| Pictograms | (GHS07: Exclamation mark) |
| Signal word | Warning |
| Hazard statements | H302, H312, H315, H319, H332, H335 |
| Precautionary statements | P261, P264, P264+P265, P270, P271, P280, P301+P317, P302+P352, P304+P340, P305+P351+P338, P317, P319, P321, P330, P332+P317, P337+P317, P362+P364, P403+P233, P405, P501 |

Related compounds
| Related compounds | Ethylene; Iodoethylene; 1,1-Diiodoethylene; 1,2-Diiodoethylene; Triiodoethylene; Tetrafluoroethylene; Tetrachloroethylene; Tetrabromoethylene; Tetraiodomethane; Hexaiodoethane |
- Except where otherwise noted, data are given for materials in their standard state (at 25 °C [77 °F], 100 kPa). Infobox references

Tetraiodoethylene, TIE or diiodoform, is an organoiodine compound with the chemical formula C_{2}I_{4}. Its structure is I_{2}C=CI_{2}. It is an odourless yellow crystalline solid that is soluble in benzene and chloroform, and insoluble in water. It has been used as an antiseptic and a component in pesticide and fungicide formulations. It is the periodinated analogue of ethylene. It is a decomposition product of carbon tetraiodide and diiodoacetylene.

Tetraiodoethylene reacts with ethylamine to give ethylamine di-tetraiodoethylene, CH_{3}CH_{2}NH_{2}·(C_{2}I_{4})_{2}, and ethylamine tetraiodoethylene, CH_{3}CH_{2}NH_{2}·C_{2}I_{4}. Tetraiodoethylene and iodine pentafluoride yield iodopentafluoroethane.

Tetraiodoethylene turns brown and emits a characteristic odour due to decomposition when exposed to light.

== History ==
Tetraiodoethylene was discovered by Baeyer in 1885. It was proposed as an antiseptic under the name Diiodoform, in 1893 by M. L. Maquenne and Taine. It was an alternative to iodoform which has a strong and persistent odour that caused difficulties for physicians in private practices.

== Synthesis ==
Tetraiodoethylene can be made by the iodination of calcium carbide:

CaC_{2} + 3 I_{2} → C_{2}I_{4} + CaI_{2}

Diiodoacetylene is a byproduct of the reaction which can later be iodinated to TIE.

The action of aqueous solution of potassium hydroxide and iodine on barium carbide in chloroform or benzene can also give TIE. Another synthesis involves mixing separate solutions of diiodoacetylene and iodine in carbon disulphide. Tetraiodoethylene would be left as a residue after carbon disulphide was evaporated.

== See also ==
- 1,2-Diiodoethylene
- Triiodoethylene
- Tetrafluoroethylene
- Tetrachloroethylene
- Tetrabromoethylene
