= Hexachloroethane =

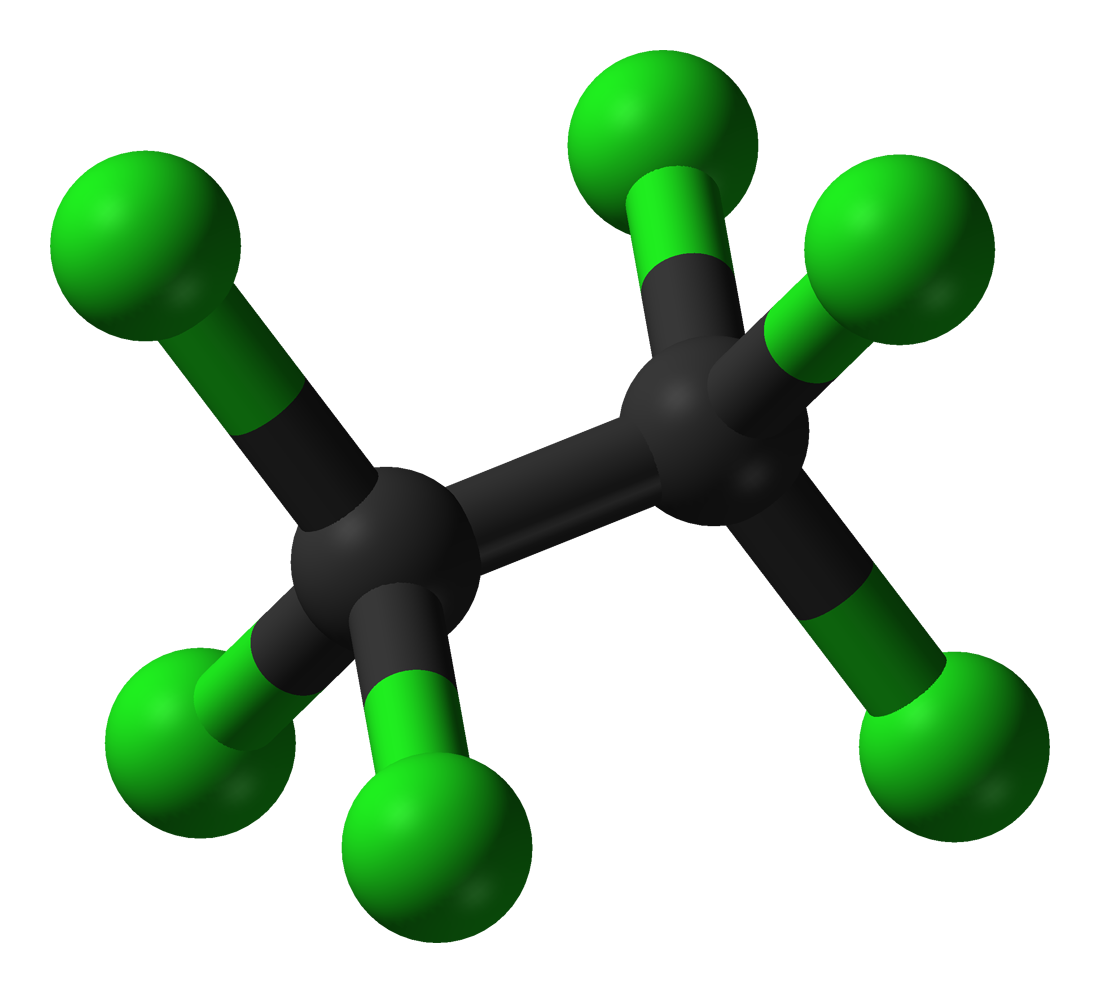

Names
- Preferred IUPAC name Hexachloroethane
- Other names: Carbon hexachloride; Ethane hexachloride; Perchloroethane; Sesquichloride of carbon

Identifiers
CAS Number	67-72-1
3D model (JSmol)	Interactive image
Beilstein Reference	1740341
ChEBI	CHEBI:39227
ChEMBL	ChEMBL160929
ChemSpider	5979
ECHA InfoCard	100.000.606
EC Number	200-666-4
Gmelin Reference	26648
KEGG	C19248
PubChem CID	6214
UNII	G30K3QQT4J
CompTox Dashboard (EPA)	DTXSID7020689
- InChI: InChI=1S/C2Cl6/c3-1(4,5)2(6,7)8 Key: VHHHONWQHHHLTI-UHFFFAOYSA-N; InChI=1/C2Cl6/c3-1(4,5)2(6,7)8 Key: VHHHONWQHHHLTI-UHFFFAOYAD
- SMILES: ClC(Cl)(Cl)C(Cl)(Cl)Cl

Properties
Chemical formula	C_{2}Cl_{6}
Molar mass	236.72 g·mol^{−1}
Appearance	colorless crystals
Odor	camphor-like
Density	2.091 g/mL at 25 °C
Melting point	sublimes
Boiling point	183 to 185 °C (361 to 365 °F; 456 to 458 K)
Solubility in water	0.005% (22.2 °C)
Vapor pressure	0.2 millimetres of mercury (27 Pa) (20 °C)
Magnetic susceptibility (χ)	−112.7·10^{−6} cm^{3}/mol

Hazards
- Occupational safety and health (OHS/OSH)
Main hazards	Probable carcinogen, dangerous central nervous system depressant
NFPA 704 (fire diamond)	2 0 0
Flash point	noncombustible
- Lethal dose or concentration (LD, LC)
LD_{50} (median dose)	4460 mg/kg (rat, oral); 4970 mg/kg (guinea pig, oral)
- NIOSH (US health exposure limits)
PEL (Permissible)	TWA 1 ppm (10 mg/m^{3}) [skin]
REL (Recommended)	Ca TWA 1 ppm (10 mg/m^{3}) [skin]
IDLH (Immediate danger)	Ca [300 ppm]

Related compounds
Related compounds	Carbon tetrachloride; Octachloropropane; Ethane; Dichloroacetylene; Tetrachloroethylene; 1,1,1,2-Tetrachloroethane; 1,1,2,2-Tetrachloroethane; Pentachloroethane; Tetrachloro-1,1-difluoroethane; Tetrachloro-1,2-difluoroethane; Hexafluoroethane Hexabromoethane; Hexaiodoethane
- Except where otherwise noted, data are given for materials in their standard state (at 25 °C [77 °F], 100 kPa). verify (what is ?) Infobox references

Hexachloroethane (perchloroethane) is an organochlorine compound with the chemical formula C_{2}Cl_{6}. Its structure is Cl_{3}C−CCl_{3}. It is a white or colorless solid at room temperature with a camphor-like odor. It has been used by the military in smoke compositions, such as base-eject smoke munitions (smoke grenades).

== History ==
Hexachloroethane was discovered along with ethylene tetrachloride ("protochloride of carbon") by Michael Faraday in 1820. Faraday obtained it by chlorinating ethylene. He named it "perchloride of carbon". Faustino Malaguti obtained hexachloroethane by exposing a mixture of tetrachloroethylene and chlorine to sunlight. He termed it "chloride of chlorethose" as it was produced by the chlorination of tetrachloroethylene (then known as "chlorethose").

== Manufacture ==
Chlorination of tetrachloroethylene at 100–140 °C with the presence of iron(III) chloride is the most commonly used commercial production method, however several other methods exist. A high purity form can be produced in a small scale by reacting chlorine together with barium carbide. In September 1997, it was reported as no longer being produced in the United States for commercial distribution, but was produced as a by-product of industrial chlorination process.

== Applications ==
Hexachloroethane has been used in the formulation of extreme pressure lubricants. It has also been used as a chain transfer agent in the emulsion polymerization of propylene–tetrafluoroethylene copolymer. Hexachloroethane has been used as an anthelmintic in veterinary medicine (under the tradename Avlothane), a rubber accelerator, a component of fungicidal and insecticidal formulations as well as a moth repellant and a plasticizer for cellulose esters.

Hexachloroethane has been used in the manufacture of degassing pellets to remove hydrogen gas bubbles from molten aluminum in aluminum foundries. This use, as well as similar uses in magnesium, is being phased out in the European Union.

=== Use as smoke agent ===
Smoke grenades, called hexachloroethane smoke or HC smoke, utilize a mixture containing roughly equal parts of hexachloroethane and zinc oxide and approximately 6% granular aluminium. These smokes are toxic, which is attributed to the production of zinc chloride (ZnCl_{2}). According to Steinritz et al., “Due to its potential pulmonary toxicity,” zinc chloride producing smoke grenades “have been discharged from the armory of most western countries (…).” HC smoke inhalation can cause severe acute respiratory distress syndrome. The chemical is a suspected carcinogen, has effects on the nervous system, and can cause sudden collapse and death at high doses. The United States Naval Academy considers it a chemical weapon. It is also considered a "Type 2" pulmonary agent and a lung-damaging agent.

In 2020, US federal agents in Portland, Oregon used canisters of HC gas against protestors.

== Toxicity ==
Hexachloroethane has relatively low acute oral toxicity, with a median lethal dose (LD50) greater than 5000 mg/kg in rats, but is readily absorbed through the skin. The primary effect of exposure is depression of the central nervous system. Acute inhalation exposure may cause coughing and breathing difficulty, with toxic effects potentially delayed up to 24 hours. Occupational exposure limits are typically set at 1 ppm (10 mg/m³) as an 8-hour time-weighted average, with skin notations in the United States, Canada, and international guidelines indicating that dermal absorption contributes significantly to overall exposure. The concentration immediately dangerous to life or health is 300 ppm.

Hexachloroethane is suspected of causing cancer and may cause organ damage through prolonged or repeated exposure. The International Agency for Research on Cancer classifies it as Group 2B (possibly carcinogenic to humans), and the U.S. National Toxicology Program lists it as reasonably anticipated to be a human carcinogen. The compound is highly toxic to aquatic life and may bioaccumulate in organisms, posing long-term risks to aquatic environments.
