= Tetrachlorodifluoroethane =

Tetrachlorodifluoroethane is the name for two isomers.

- Tetrachloro-1,2-difluoroethane, also known as CFC-112
- Tetrachloro-1,1-difluoroethane, also known as CFC-112a
