= TeCA =

TeCA may refer to:

- 1,1,2,2-Tetrachloroethane
- Tetracyclic antidepressant
