= Tetrachloroethane =

Tetrachloroethane (C_{2}H_{2}Cl_{4}) may refer to either of two isomeric chemical compounds:

- 1,1,1,2-Tetrachloroethane (R-130a)
- 1,1,2,2-Tetrachloroethane (R-130)

== See also ==
- Tetrachloroethene
- Trichloroethane
- Tetrafluoroethane
- Tetrabromoethane
