= Tetrachloro-1,1-difluoroethane =

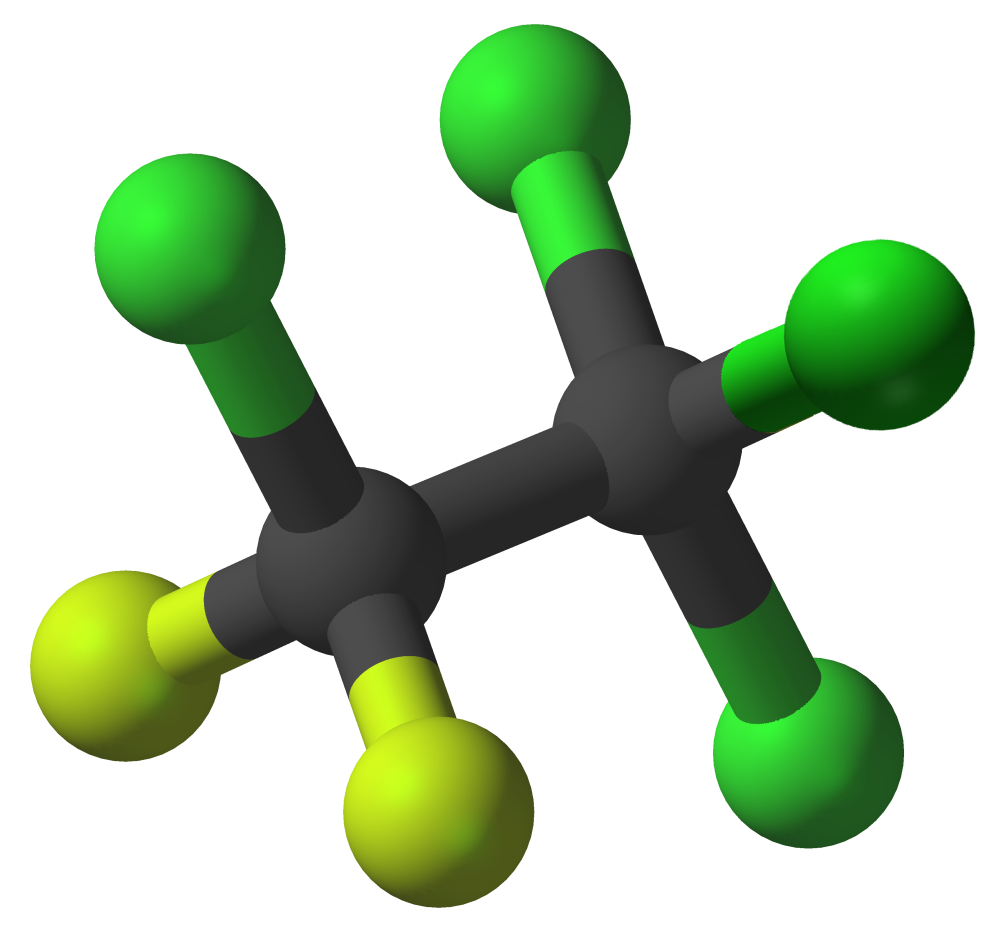

Names
- IUPAC name 1,1,1,2-tetrachloro-2,2-difluoroethane
- Other names CFC-112a, Freon 112a, R-112a

Identifiers
CAS Number	76-11-9
3D model (JSmol)	Interactive image
ChemSpider	6186
ECHA InfoCard	100.000.850
EC Number	200-934-0
PubChem CID	6426
RTECS number	KI1425000
UNII	76ZK8AK9CJ
UN number	1078
CompTox Dashboard (EPA)	DTXSID90861622
- InChI: InChI=1S/C2Cl4F2/c3-1(4,5)2(6,7)8 Key: SLGOCMATMKJJCE-UHFFFAOYSA-N
- SMILES: C(C(Cl)(Cl)Cl)(F)(F)Cl

Properties
Chemical formula	C_{2}Cl_{4}F_{2}
Molar mass	203.82 g·mol^{−1}
Density	1.65 g/mL
Melting point	25 °C (77 °F; 298 K)
Boiling point	91 °C (196 °F; 364 K)

Related compounds
Related compounds	CFC-112
- Except where otherwise noted, data are given for materials in their standard state (at 25 °C [77 °F], 100 kPa). Infobox references

Tetrachloro-1,1-difluoroethane or 1,1,1,2-tetrachloro-2,2-difluoroethane, Freon 112a, R-112a, or CFC-112a is an asymmetric chlorofluorocarbon isomer of tetrachloro-1,1-difluoroethane with formula CClF_{2}CCl_{3}. It contains ethane substituted by four chlorine atoms and two fluorine atoms. With a boiling point of 91.5°C it is the freon with second highest boiling point.

Tetrachlorodifluoroethane as made is a mixture of the symmetrical and asymmetric isomers.

== Preparation ==
Tetrachloro-1,1-difluoroethane can be prepared in 40% yield by reacting 1,1,2-trichloro-1,2,2-trifluoroethane (freon 113) with aluminium chloride at 60°C.

It can also be made in a reaction with hydrogen fluoride with hexachloroethane or tetrachloroethane with extra chlorine. This reaction occurs with an aluminium fluoride catalyst at 400°C. unsymmetrical trichlorotrifluoroethane (CCl_{2}FCClF_{2}) is also produced along with other chlorofluorocarbons. Separation of the symmetrical and unsymmetrical isomer is difficult.

== Properties ==
Tetrachloro-1,1-difluoroethane is non-combustible.

It has a critical pressure of 4.83 MPa and a critical temperature of 279.2°C. At the critical point the density is 0.754 g/cm^{3}.

Tetrachloro-1,1-difluoroethane in liquid form is miscible with perfluorocarbons.

=== Reactions ===
Tetrachloro-1,1-difluoroethane reacts with zinc in ethanol at 60°C to yield unsymmetrical dichlorodifluoroethylene (Cl_{2}C=CF_{2}).

== Uses ==
Tetrachlorodifluoroethane (CFC-112a), as with most high boiling point CFCs, has various uses as a non-flammable and clean agent solvent. It has historically been used as an extractant in liquid-liquid extraction and dry cleaning processes. CFC-112 and CFC-112a have also been used as feedstock chemicals in the manufacturing of fluorovinyl ethers. CFC-112a and its isomers are attractive organic solvents, as they have many important properties: they are nonflammable, clean drying, and have lower toxicity than common chlorinated organic solvents.

Tetrachlorodifluoroethane (mixture of isomers) has a niche application as a veterinary medicine to treat parasites (Fasciola hepatica).

== Atmosphere ==
Tetrachloro-1,1-difluoroethane was first detected in air collected from Cape Grim, Tasmania in the Cape Grim Air Archive, and later from air bubbles in snow from Greenland. The substance made its first appearance around 1965, and increased in level until around 2000. In 2000 Earth's atmosphere contained 0.08 parts per trillion of Freon 112a. Level slightly declined to 0.07 ppt by 2012. Estimated lifetime in the stratosphere is 44 years. By 2014 3,600 tons of Freon 112a had been put into the atmosphere. As of 2023, levels have been rising in the Earth's atmosphere.

As a greenhouse gas its radiative efficiency is 0.25 Wm^{−2}ppb^{−1}.

== Extra reading ==
- Sládek, Petr; Navrátil, Oldřich; Linhart, Petr (1992). "Extraction of Selected Lanthanoids and Scandium with Bis(2-ethylhexyl)hydrogenphosphate in 1,1,2,2-Tetrachlorodifluoroethane". Collection of Czechoslovak Chemical Communications. 57 (8): 1647–1654. doi:10.1135/cccc19921647.
- Sládek, Petr; Navrátil, Oldřich; Linhart, Petr (1992). "Extraction of Ce, Pm, Eu, Tm and Sc Using Di-n-butylhydrogenphosphate in 1,1,2,2-Tetrachlorodifluoroethane". Collection of Czechoslovak Chemical Communications. 57 (8): 1639–1646. doi:10.1135/cccc19921639.
- Kakáč, B.; Hudlický, M. (1965). "Organic compounds of fluorine. VII. Spectrophotometric study in the series of halofluoroethanes". Collection of Czechoslovak Chemical Communications. 30 (3): 745–751. doi:10.1135/cccc19650745.
