= Hexabromoethane =

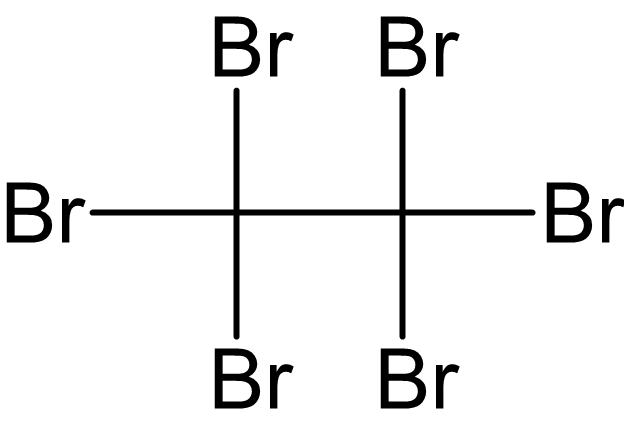

Names
- Other names perbromoethane

Identifiers
CAS Number	594-73-0
3D model (JSmol)	Interactive image
ChemSpider	120156
PubChem CID	136384
CompTox Dashboard (EPA)	DTXSID80208128
- InChI: InChI=1S/C2Br6/c3-1(4,5)2(6,7)8 Key: POJPQMDDRCILHJ-UHFFFAOYSA-N
- SMILES: C(C(Br)(Br)Br)(Br)(Br)Br

Properties
Chemical formula	C_{2}Br_{6}
Molar mass	503.446 g·mol^{−1}
Appearance	yellowish crystals
Boiling point	210–215 °C (410–419 °F; 483–488 K)

Related compounds
Related compounds	Carbon tetrabromide; Octabromopropane; Ethane; Dibromoacetylene; Tetrabromoethylene; Hexafluoroethane; Hexachloroethane; Hexaiodoethane
- Except where otherwise noted, data are given for materials in their standard state (at 25 °C [77 °F], 100 kPa). Infobox references

Hexabromoethane (HBE, perbromoethane) is a perbromocarbon with the chemical formula C_{2}Br_{6}. Its structure is Br_{3}C−CBr_{3}. It is a yellowish white crystalline solid. It decomposes to tetrabromoethylene upon heating. Like many other halocarbons, HBE decomposes when exposed to radiation.

== See also ==
- Hexafluoroethane
- Hexachloroethane
- Bromoethane
- Pentabromoethane
