= Carbon tetraiodide =

- Stereo, skeletal formula of carbon tetraiodide

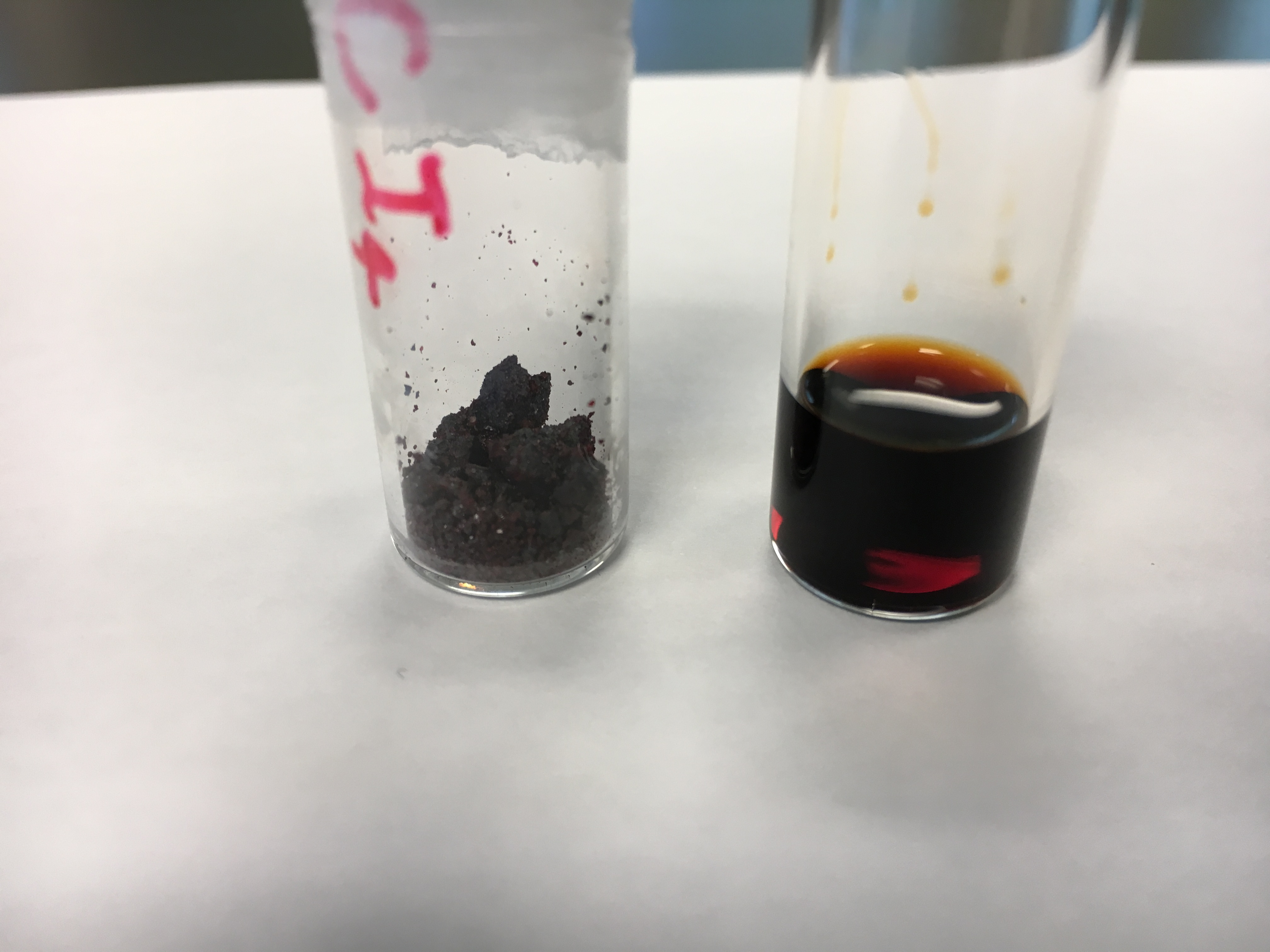
- Degraded carbon tetraiodide crystals (left); Solution in diethyl ether (right)

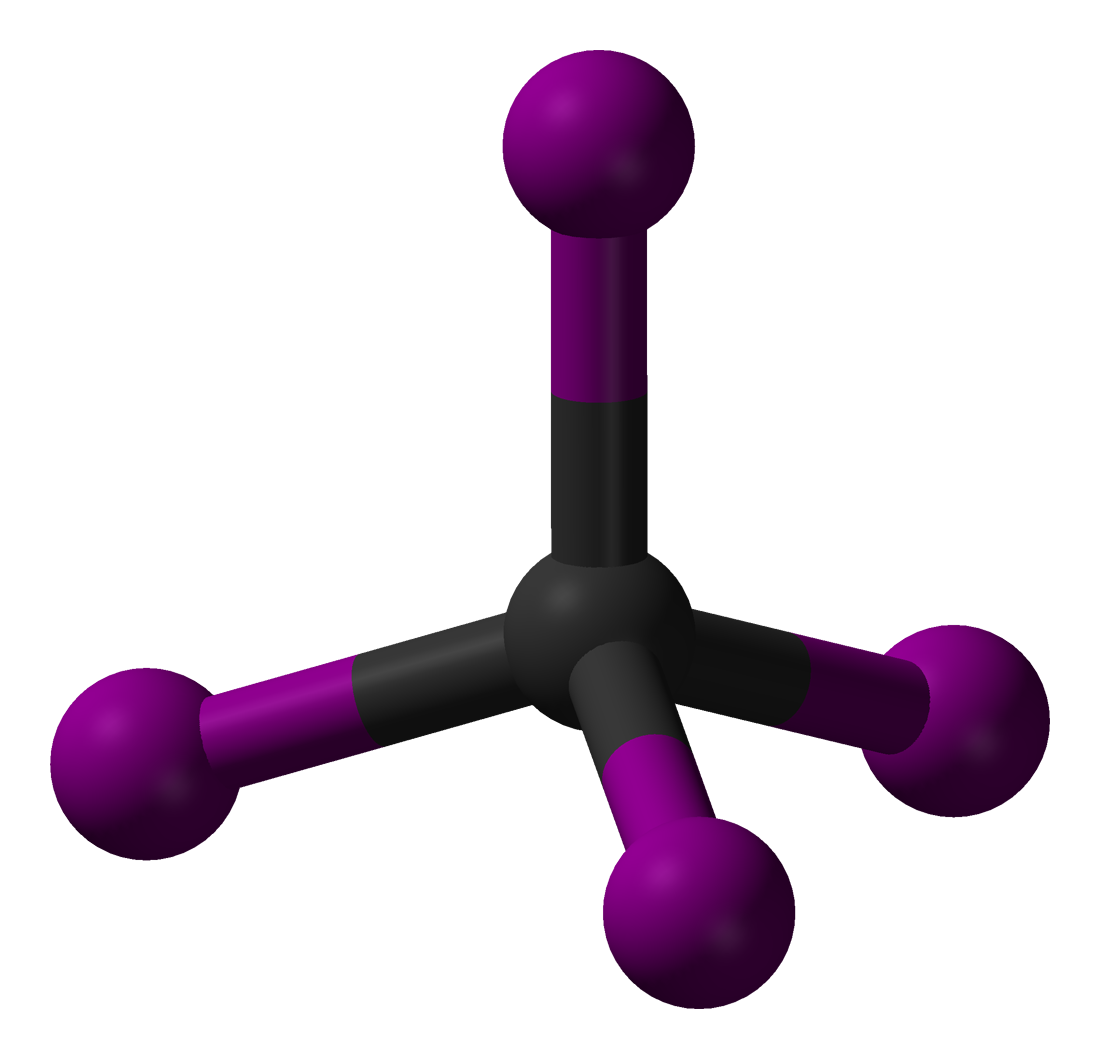
Ball and stick model of carbon tetraiodide
Space-filling model of carbon tetraiodide

Names
- Preferred IUPAC name Tetraiodomethane

Identifiers
CAS Number	507-25-5
3D model (JSmol)	Interactive image
Beilstein Reference	1733108
ChemSpider	10055
ECHA InfoCard	100.007.335
EC Number	208-068-5
PubChem CID	10487
RTECS number	FG4960000
UNII	E22GNX36ZQ
CompTox Dashboard (EPA)	DTXSID0060145
- InChI: InChI=1S/CI4/c2-1(3,4)5 Key: JOHCVVJGGSABQY-UHFFFAOYSA-N
- SMILES: IC(I)(I)I

Properties
Chemical formula	CI_{4}
Molar mass	519.629 g·mol^{−1}
Appearance	Red crystals
Density	4.32 g mL^{−1}
Magnetic susceptibility (χ)	−136·10^{−6} cm^{3}/mol

Structure
Crystal structure	Tetragonal
Molecular shape	Tetrahedral
Dipole moment	0 D

Thermochemistry
Heat capacity (C)	0.500 J K^{−1} g^{−1}
Std enthalpy of formation (Δ_{f}H^{⦵}_{298})	384.0–400.4 kJ mol^{−1}
Std enthalpy of combustion (Δ_{c}H^{⦵}_{298})	−794.4 to −778.4 kJ mol^{−1}

Hazards
- Occupational safety and health (OHS/OSH)
Main hazards	toxic
- GHS labelling
Pictograms	(GHS07: Exclamation mark)
Signal word	Warning
Hazard statements	H315, H319, H335
Precautionary statements	P261, P305+P351+P338

Related compounds
Other anions	Carbon tetrafluoride Carbon tetrachloride Carbon tetrabromide
Other cations	Silicon tetraiodide Germanium tetraiodide Tin(IV) iodide
Related alkanes	Methane; Methyl iodide; Diiodomethane; Iodoform; Ethane; Ethyl iodide
Related compounds	Pimagedine; Guanidine
- Except where otherwise noted, data are given for materials in their standard state (at 25 °C [77 °F], 100 kPa). verify (what is ?) Infobox references

Carbon tetraiodide is a tetrahalomethane with the molecular formula CI_{4}. Being bright red, it is a relatively rare example of a highly colored methane derivative. It is only 2.3% by weight carbon, although other methane derivatives are known with still less carbon.

== Structure ==
The tetrahedral molecule features C–I distances of 2.12 ± 0.02 Å. The molecule is slightly crowded with short contacts between iodine atoms of 3.459 ± 0.03 Å, and possibly for this reason, it is thermally and photochemically unstable.

Carbon tetraiodide crystallizes in tetragonal crystal structure (a 6.409, c 9.558 (.10^{−1} nm)).

It has zero dipole moment due to its symmetrically substituted tetrahedral geometry.

== Properties, synthesis, and uses ==
Carbon tetraiodide is slightly reactive towards water, giving iodoform and I_{2}. It is soluble in nonpolar organic solvents. It decomposes thermally and photochemically to tetraiodoethylene, C_{2}I_{4}. Its synthesis entails AlCl_{3}-catalyzed halide exchange, which is conducted at room temperature:

CCl_{4} + 4 EtI → C(I)_{4} + 4 EtCl

The product crystallizes from the reaction solution.

Carbon tetraiodide is used as an iodination reagent, often upon reaction with bases. Ketones are converted to 1,1-diiodoalkenes upon treatment with triphenylphosphine (PPh_{3}) and carbon tetraiodide. Alcohols are converted in and to iodide, by a mechanism similar to the Appel reaction. In an Appel reaction, carbon tetrachloride is used to generate alkyl chlorides from alcohols.

== Safety considerations ==
Manufacturers recommend that carbon tetraiodide be stored near 0 °C (32 °F). As a ready source of iodine, it is an irritant. Its LD_{50} on rats is 18 mg/kg. In general, perhalogenated organic compounds should be considered toxic, with the narrow exception of small perfluoroalkanes (essentially inert due to the strength of the C–F bond).
