= 1,2-Diiodoethylene =

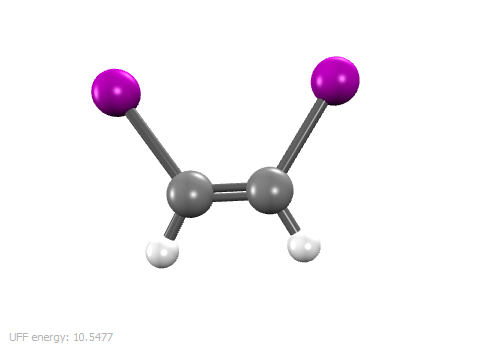
Skeletal formula of cis-1,2-difluoroethene
cis-1,2-Diiodoethene (Z)
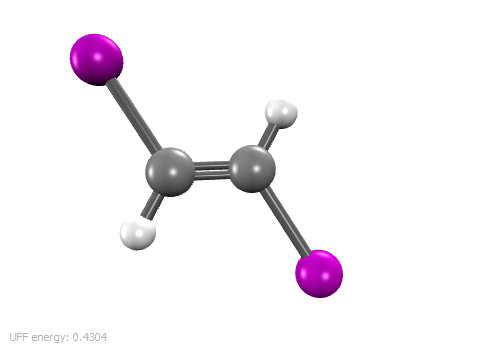
Skeletal formula of trans-1,2-difluoroethene
trans-1,2-Diiodoethene (E)
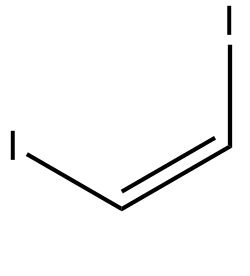
Skeletal formula of Cis-1,2-DIIODOETHYLENE
cis-1,2-Diiodoethene (Z)
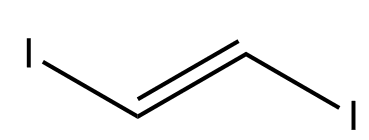
Skeletal formula of Trans-1,2-DIIODOETHYLENE
trans-1,2-Diiodoethene (E)

Names
- Preferred IUPAC name 1,2-Diiodoethene
- Other names 1,2-Diiodoethylene sym-Diiodoethylene

Identifiers
CAS Number	590-27-2 (Z); 20244-70-6 (E)
3D model (JSmol)	Interactive image; Interactive image
ChemSpider	4576037 (Z); 4527007 (E)
EC Number	209-821-0
PubChem CID	11537; 5463341 (Z); 5378102 (E)
CompTox Dashboard (EPA)	DTXSID20871779
- InChI: InChI=1S/C2H2I2/c3-1-2-4/h1-2H/b2-1+ Key: CVOGMKGEVNGRSK-OWOJBTEDSA-N
- SMILES: C(=CI)I; C(=C/I)\I

Properties
Chemical formula	C_{2}H_{2}I_{2}
Molar mass	279.847 g/mol
Melting point	73.4 °C (164.1 °F; 346.5 K)
Boiling point	196 to 197 °C (385 to 387 °F; 469 to 470 K)
- Except where otherwise noted, data are given for materials in their standard state (at 25 °C [77 °F], 100 kPa). verify (what is ?) Infobox references

1,2-Diiodoethylene, also known as 1,2-diiodoethene, is an organoiodide with the molecular formula C_{2}H_{2}I_{2}. It can exist as either of two geometric isomers, cis-1,2-diiodoethylene or trans-1,2-diiodoethylene.

== E-Z relative stability ==
Like most cis-trans compounds, the Z isomer (cis) is less stable than the E isomer (trans) by 2 kcal/mol.

== See also ==
- 1,1-Diiodoethane
- 1,2-Diiodoethane
