= Tetrafluoroethylene =

Tetrafluoroethylene
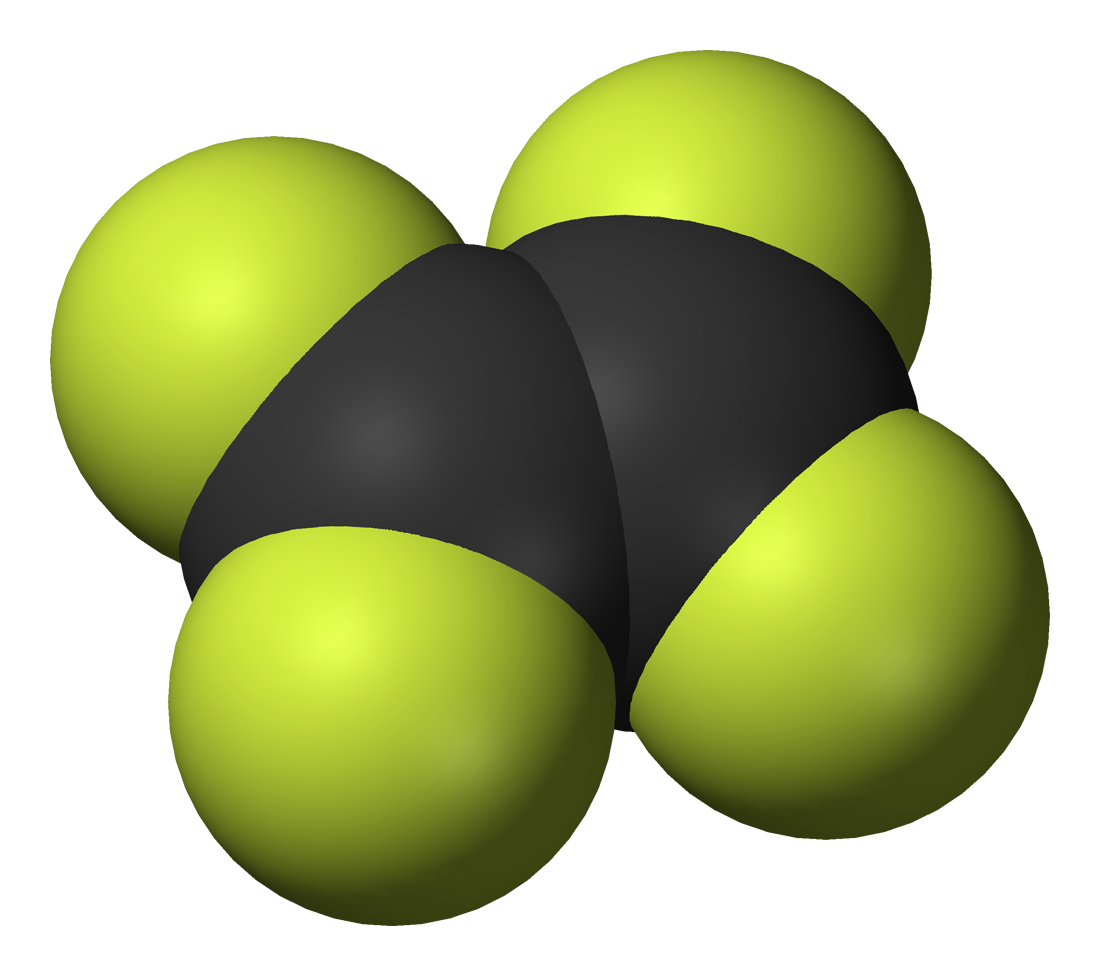
Tetrafluoroethylene

Names
- Preferred IUPAC name Tetrafluoroethene
- Other names: Perfluoroethylene; TFE; Carbon difluoride; Dicarbon tetrafluoride

Identifiers
CAS Number	116-14-3
3D model (JSmol)	Interactive image
ChEBI	CHEBI:38866
ChEMBL	ChEMBL541730
ChemSpider	8000
ECHA InfoCard	100.003.752
KEGG	C19299
PubChem CID	8301
UNII	OMW63Z518S
CompTox Dashboard (EPA)	DTXSID6021325
- InChI: InChI=1S/C2F4/c3-1(4)2(5)6 Key: BFKJFAAPBSQJPD-UHFFFAOYSA-N; InChI=1/C2F4/c3-1(4)2(5)6 Key: BFKJFAAPBSQJPD-UHFFFAOYAC
- SMILES: FC(F)=C(F)F

Properties
Chemical formula	C_{2}F_{4}
Molar mass	100.016 g·mol^{−1}
Appearance	Colorless gas
Odor	Odorless
Density	1.519 g/cm^{3} at −76 °C
Melting point	−142.5 °C (−224.5 °F; 130.7 K)
Boiling point	−76.3 °C (−105.3 °F; 196.8 K)

Hazards
- Occupational safety and health (OHS/OSH)
Main hazards	Explosive (especially if oxygen is present), possible carcinogen
NFPA 704 (fire diamond)	3 4 3 OX

Related compounds
Related compounds	Ethylene; Tetrachloroethylene; Tetrabromoethylene; Tetraiodoethylene; Vinyl fluoride; 1,1-Difluoroethylene; 1,2-Difluoroethylene; Trifluoroethylene; Tetrafluoromethane; Hexafluoroethane
- Except where otherwise noted, data are given for materials in their standard state (at 25 °C [77 °F], 100 kPa). verify (what is ?) Infobox references

Tetrafluoroethylene (TFE) is a fluorocarbon with the chemical formula C_{2}F_{4}. It is a colorless gas. Its structure is F_{2}C=CF_{2}. It is used primarily in the industrial preparation of fluoropolymers. It is the simplest perfluorinated alkene.

== History ==
Tetrafluoroethylene was first obtained by the French chemist [fr] Camille Chabrié by heating tetrachloroethylene with silver(II) fluoride. It was named "dicarbon tetrafluoride" based on its composition, analogous to "dicarbon tetrachloride" for tetrachloroethylene which it was first made from.

== Properties ==
Tetrafluoroethylene is a colorless, odorless gas that is insoluble in water. It is degraded by bases. Thermally, it decomposes to carbon and carbon tetrafluoride (CF_{4}). It forms explosive peroxides in contact with air.

== Industrial use ==
Polymerization of tetrafluoroethylene produces fluoropolymers such as Teflon and Fluon. PTFE is one of the two fluorocarbon resins composed wholly of fluorine and carbon. The other resin composed purely of carbon and fluorine is the copolymer of TFE with typically 6–9% hexafluoropropene (HFP), which is known as FEP (fluorinated ethylene propylene copolymer). TFE is also used in the preparation of numerous copolymers that also include hydrogen and/or oxygen, including both fluoroplastics and fluoroelastomers. Typical TFE-based fluoroplastics include ETFE, the alternating 1:1 copolymer with ethylene, and PFA, which is a random copolymer similar to FEP but with a minor amount of a perfluoroalkyl vinyl ether (PAVE) rather than HFP. DuPont uses primarily perfluoro(methylvinylether), whereas Daikin uses primarily perfluoro(propylvinylether) in manufacturing PFA. There are numerous other fluoropolymers that contain TFE, but usually not at greater than 50% by weight.

Many organofluorine compounds are produced from TFE. Pentafluoroethyl iodide is produced by iodination of tetrafluoroethylene:

C_{2}F_{4} + I_{2} → IF_{2}CCF_{2}I

followed by exchange of one iodine using iodine pentafluoride:

5 IC_{2}F_{4}I + IF_{5} → 5 CF_{3}CF_{2}I + 3 I_{2}

With tetrafluoroethylene, it undergoes telomerization:

5 C_{2}F_{5}I + n C_{2}F_{4} → C_{2}F_{5}(C_{2}F_{4})_{n}I

These perfluoroalkyl iodides are precursors to organofluorine surfactants.

== Manufacture ==
TFE is manufactured from chloroform: Chloroform is fluorinated by reaction with hydrogen fluoride to produce chlorodifluoromethane (R-22). Pyrolysis of chlorodifluoromethane (at 550–750 °C) yields TFE, with difluorocarbene as an intermediate.

CHCl_{3} + 2 HF → CHClF_{2} + 2 HCl
2 CHClF_{2} → C_{2}F_{4} + 2 HCl

Alternatively, it can be prepared by pyrolysis of fluoroform.

=== Laboratory methods ===
TFE is produced by the pyrolysis of the sodium salt of pentafluoropropionic acid:

CF_{3}CF_{2}CO^{−}_{2}Na^{+} → C_{2}F_{4} + CO_{2} + NaF

The depolymerization reaction – vacuum pyrolysis of PTFE at 650–700 °C (1,200–1,290 °F) in a quartz vessel – is a traditional laboratory synthesis of TFE. The process is however challenging because attention must be paid to pressure, as well as the avoidance of perfluoroisobutene. PTFE polymer cracks, and at a pressure below 5 Torr (670 Pa) exclusively C_{2}F_{4} is obtained. At higher pressures the product mixture contains hexafluoropropylene and octafluorocyclobutane.

== Reactions ==
Tetrafluoroethylene is a reactive molecule that participates in myriad reactions. Owing to the presence of four fluorine substituents, its reactions differ strongly from the behavior of conventional alkenes such as ethylene. Tetrafluoroethylene dimerizes, giving octafluorocyclobutane. Even normal alkenes and dienes add tetrafluoroethylene in a [2+2] manner. 1,3-Butadiene gives 3-vinyl-1,1,2,2-tetrafluorocyclobutane.

With sulfur trioxide, TFE gives a sultone cyclo adduct, which rearranges to a sulfonyl fluoride FC(O)CF_{2}SO_{2}F.

== Safety ==
TFE reacts with oxygen at low temperatures to form an explosive oxide, the detonation of which is usually sufficient to trigger explosive decomposition of TFE to C and CF_{4}. Explosions can also be caused by adiabatic compression if the TFE is handled under high pressure, which it typically is in an industrial setting. If pressurised TFE is allowed into a vessel or pipework at a lower pressure, then the atmosphere in the vessel will be compressed by the TFE, causing it to heat up, potentially to the point where it might detonate the TFE. This has been known to cause explosions. In industry, pipework is flushed with pressurized nitrogen, before the introduction of TFE, both to exclude oxygen and prevent adiabatic compression.

LD_{50}(rat, inhalation) = 40000 ppm.

The International Agency for Research on Cancer classifies TFE as probably carcinogenic to humans based on animal studies. TFE is not considered to be a PFAS

== See also ==
- Tetrachloroethylene
- 1,1,1,2-Tetrafluoroethane
- Fluorochemical industry
