= Pentafluoroethyl iodide (data page) =

Chemical data page

The complete data for Pentafluoroethyliodide
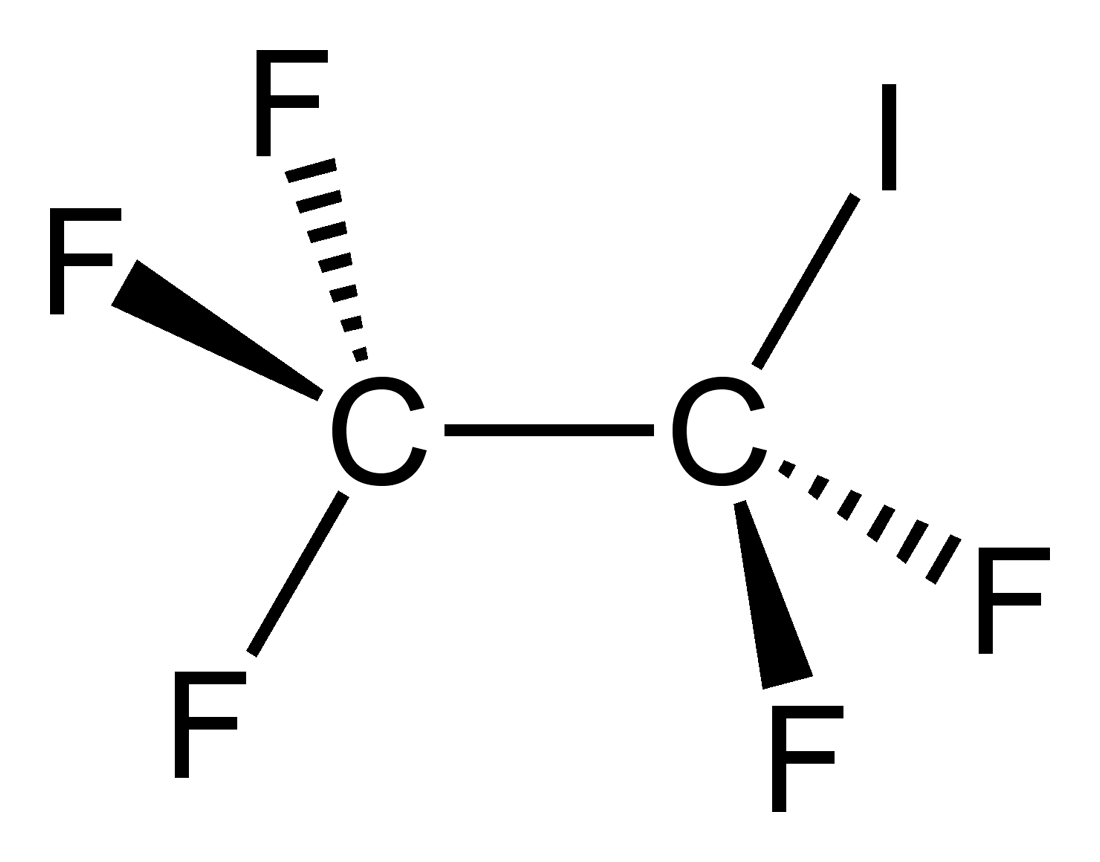
General information
Chemical formula: C_{2}IF_{5}
Molar mass: 245.918 g·mol^{−1}
Systematic name:
1,1,1,2,2-pentafluoro-2-iodo-ethane
Synonyms:
Iodopentafluoroethane
Pentafluoroiodoethane
Database data
SMILES: C(C(F)(F)I)(F)(F)F
InChI=1/C2F5I/c3-1(4,5)2(6,7)8

ATC: N/A	CAS: N/A	DrugBank: N/A	EINECS: N/A	PubChem: 9636 ^{a}

Physical properties

Structure	Crystal data	Spectral data: UV-Vis / IR / NMR / MS

Phase behavior	Solid properties	Liquid properties	Gas properties

Hazard properties

MSDS N/A	Main hazards: N/A	NFPA 704	Flash point: N/A	RTECS number: N/A

Chemical properties

XLogP: 3.036	pI: none	pK_{a}: none	Tautomers: 0	Hydrogen bond: donor - 0; acceptor - 0

Pharmacological properties

This box:
- Except where noted otherwise, data relate to Standard temperature and pressure.
- Reliability of data general note.
