= Tetrabromoethylene =

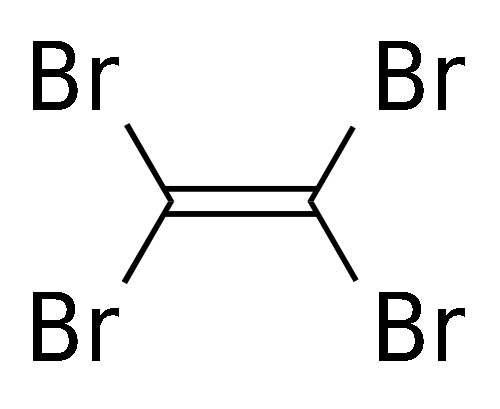

Names
- Preferred IUPAC name Tetrabromoethene
- Other names Perbromoethene

Identifiers
CAS Number	79-28-7
3D model (JSmol)	Interactive image
ChemSpider	59617
ECHA InfoCard	100.001.084
EC Number	201-192-0
PubChem CID	66232
UNII	T686675W6X
CompTox Dashboard (EPA)	DTXSID8058821
- InChI: InChI=1S/C2Br4/c3-1(4)2(5)6 Key: OVRRJBSHBOXFQE-UHFFFAOYSA-N; InChI=1/C2Br4/c3-1(4)2(5)6 Key: OVRRJBSHBOXFQE-UHFFFAOYAE
- SMILES: Br(Br)C=CBr(Br)

Properties
Chemical formula	C_{2}Br_{4}
Molar mass	343.638 g·mol^{−1}
Appearance	Colorless crystals
Melting point	50 °C (122 °F; 323 K)
Boiling point	226 °C (439 °F; 499 K)
Magnetic susceptibility (χ)	−114.8·10^{−6} cm^{3}/mol

Related compounds
Related compounds	Ethylene; Bromoethylene; 1,1-Dibromoethylene; 1,2-Dibromoethylene; Tribromoethylene; Tetrafluoroethylene; Tetrachloroethylene; Tetraiodoethylene; Tetrabromomethane; Hexabromoethane
- Except where otherwise noted, data are given for materials in their standard state (at 25 °C [77 °F], 100 kPa). verify (what is ?) Infobox references

Tetrabromoethylene is an organobromine compound with the chemical formula C_{2}Br_{4}. Its structure is Br_{2}C=CBr_{2}. Under standard conditions, it exists in a form of colorless crystals. It is a brominated derivative of ethylene. Tetrabromoethylene is a potential fungicide and bactericide on fruits. It was used in mineral separation. It is an irritant.

It is prepared from acetylene and bromine in multiple steps. One method involves dehydrobromination of pentabromoethane, other method involves bromination of dibromoethylene in chloroform. Reaction of mercuric acetylide and bromine also gives tetrabromoethylene. It can be produced by oxybrominating butane with free oxygen and bromine.

Tetrabromoethylene gives tribromoacetyl bromide upon treatment with fuming nitric acid.

== See also ==
- Tetrachloroethylene
- Tetrafluoroethylene
- Tetraiodoethylene
- Tetrabromoethane
