= Pentafluoroethyl iodide =

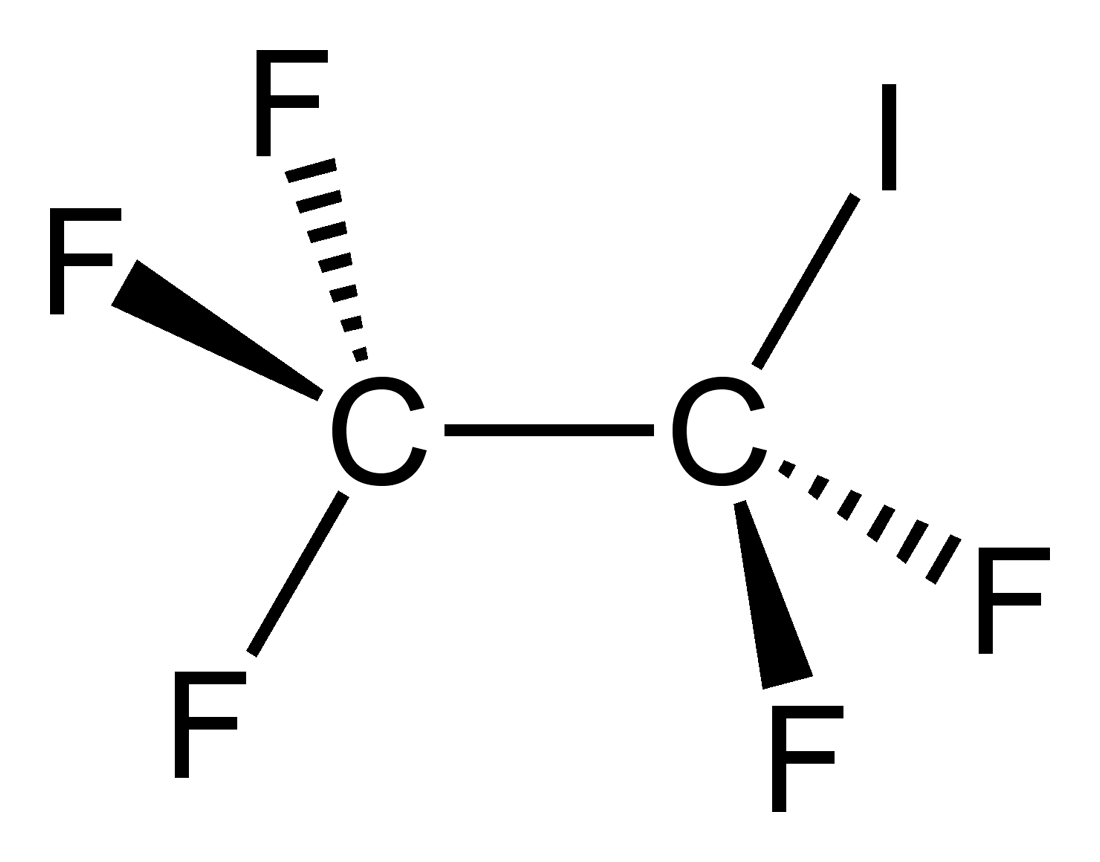

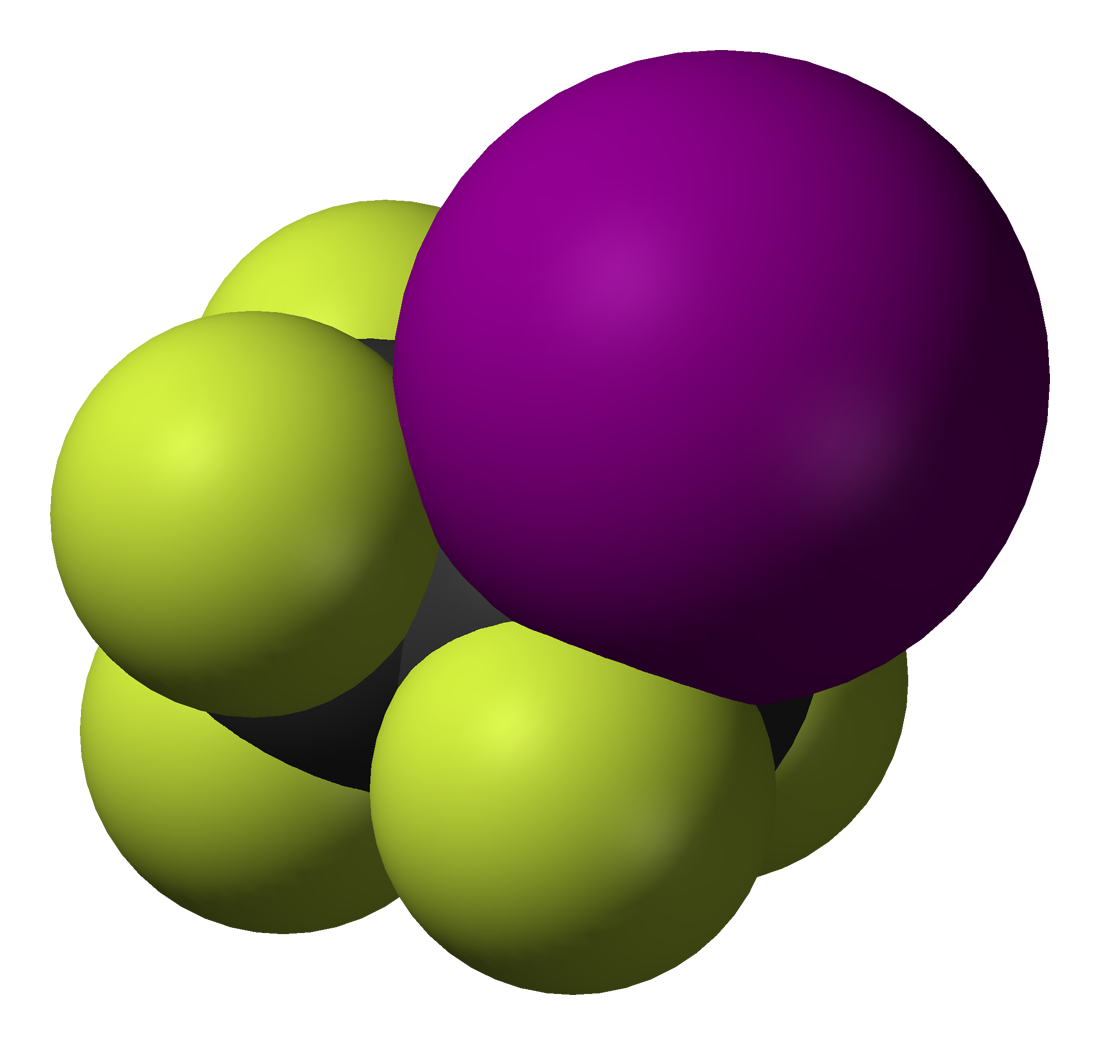

Names
- Preferred IUPAC name Pentafluoro(iodo)ethane

Identifiers
CAS Number	354-64-3
3D model (JSmol)	Interactive image
ChemSpider	9259
ECHA InfoCard	100.005.970
EC Number	206-566-7
PubChem CID	9636
UNII	0E13B713QU
CompTox Dashboard (EPA)	DTXSID8040149
- InChI: InChI=1S/C2F5I/c3-1(4,5)2(6,7)8 Key: UXPOJVLZTPGWFX-UHFFFAOYSA-N; InChI=1/C2F5I/c3-1(4,5)2(6,7)8 Key: UXPOJVLZTPGWFX-UHFFFAOYAR
- SMILES: C(C(F)(F)I)(F)(F)F

Properties
Chemical formula	C_{2}F_{5}I
Molar mass	245.918 g·mol^{−1}
Appearance	pungent colourless gas
Density	2.085 g·cm^{−3}
Melting point	−92 °C (−134 °F; 181 K)
Boiling point	12–13 °C (54–55 °F; 285–286 K)

Hazards
- GHS labelling
Pictograms	(GHS04: Compressed Gas) (GHS07: Exclamation mark)
Signal word	Warning
Hazard statements	H280, H315, H319, H335, H336
Precautionary statements	P261, P264, P271, P280, P302+P352, P304+P340, P305+P351+P338, P312, P321, P332+P313, P337+P313, P362, P403+P233, P405, P410+P403, P501

Supplementary data page
- Pentafluoroethyl iodide (data page)
- Except where otherwise noted, data are given for materials in their standard state (at 25 °C [77 °F], 100 kPa). verify (what is ?) Infobox references

Pentafluoroethyl iodide is an organofluorine compound with the formula CF_{3}CF_{2}I. It is a dense colorless gas with anesthetic properties. It is technologically significant as the progenitor of many other organofluorine compounds, including some controversial members of the PFAS class.

== Production ==
Pentafluoroethyl iodide is produced by a two-step, one-pot procedure beginning with iodination of tetrafluoroethylene:

C_{2}F_{4} + I_{2} → IF_{2}CCF_{2}I

followed by exchange of one iodine using iodine pentafluoride:

5 IC_{2}F_{4}I + IF_{5} → 5 CF_{3}CF_{2}I + 3 I_{2}

It can also be produced by fluoridation of the 1,1,2,2-tetrafluoro-1,2-diiodoethane:

C_{2}F_{4}I_{2} + HF → C_{2}F_{5}I + HI

It can also be prepared by treating the silver salt of perfluoropropionic acid with iodine.

== Uses ==
Pentafluoroethyl iodide is an intermediate of preparing organofluorine surfactants. With tetrafluoroethylene, it undergoes telomerization:

C_{2}F_{5}I + n C_{2}F_{4} → CF_{3}CF_{2}(C_{2}F_{4})_{n}I

In this reaction, it adds across the C=C double bond.

== Related compound ==
- Heptafluoropropyl iodide
- Trifluoromethyl iodide
