= Tetrachloroethylene oxide =

Names
- IUPAC name tetrachlorooxirane
- Other names Perchloroethylene oxide (PCEO), Epoxyperchlorovinyl, Tetrachloroepoxyethane

Identifiers
CAS Number	16650-10-5
3D model (JSmol)	Interactive image
ChemSpider	26022
PubChem CID	27973
UNII	2PJ36AO63Q
CompTox Dashboard (EPA)	DTXSID60168115
- InChI: InChI=1S/C2Cl4O/c3-1(4)2(5,6)7-1 Key: PHEPAUSSNBXGQO-UHFFFAOYSA-N
- SMILES: ClC1(Cl)C(Cl)(Cl)O1

Properties
Chemical formula	C_{2}Cl_{4}O
Molar mass	181.82 g·mol^{−1}
Appearance	liquid
Density	1.72 g/cm^{3}
Melting point	–58 °C
Boiling point	110 °C
- Except where otherwise noted, data are given for materials in their standard state (at 25 °C [77 °F], 100 kPa). Infobox references

Tetrachloroethylene oxide, perchloroethylene oxide (PCEO) or tetrachlorooxirane, is the perchlorinated analogue of ethylene oxide and a proposed metabolite of tetrachloroethylene. It is a halogenated epoxide with the formula C_{2}Cl_{4}O. Tetrachloroethylene oxide is fairly stable but rearranges to trichloroacetyl chloride at higher temperatures.

== Production ==
The synthesis of tetrachloroethylene oxide via the oxidation of tetrachloroethylene was described by the French chemist A. Besson in 1894. He identified the compound as the epoxide of tetrachloroethylene, noted its boiling point as 110 °C and named it "oxide of perchlorinated ethylene" (oxyde d'éthylène perchloré).

Tetrachloroethylene oxide was later synthesised by the English chemist Frederick William Kirkbride in 1940, by exposing a mixture of oxygen and chlorine in tetrachloroethylene to UV light.

Tetrachloroethylene oxide can be obtained by the direct oxidation of tetrachloroethylene under UV light.

== Reactions ==
Unlike most epoxides, PCEO does not polymerise.

PCEO reacts with methanol, with mercury(II) chloride as the catalyst, giving methyl trichloroacetate and hydrogen chloride:

C_{2}Cl_{4}O + CH_{3}OH → CH_{3}O(CO)CCl_{3} + HCl

PCEO reacts with methanolic potassium hydroxide to give potassium oxalate. It is slowly decomposed by dilute acid or base solutions, giving off carbon monoxide, carbon dioxide and hydrogen chloride which was possibly from the further decomposition of the intermediate oxalyl chloride.

== Metabolism ==
Tetrachloroethylene oxide (PCEO) is a short-living metabolite of tetrachloroethylene. Unlike most epoxide metabolites, PCEO does not exhibit mutagenic or carcinogenic effects.

It is metabolised to trichloroacetyl chloride which is hydrolysed to trichloroacetic acid.

== See also ==
- Chloroethylene oxide
