= Trichloroacetyl chloride =

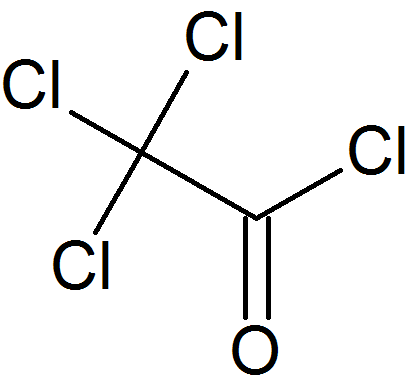
Structural formula
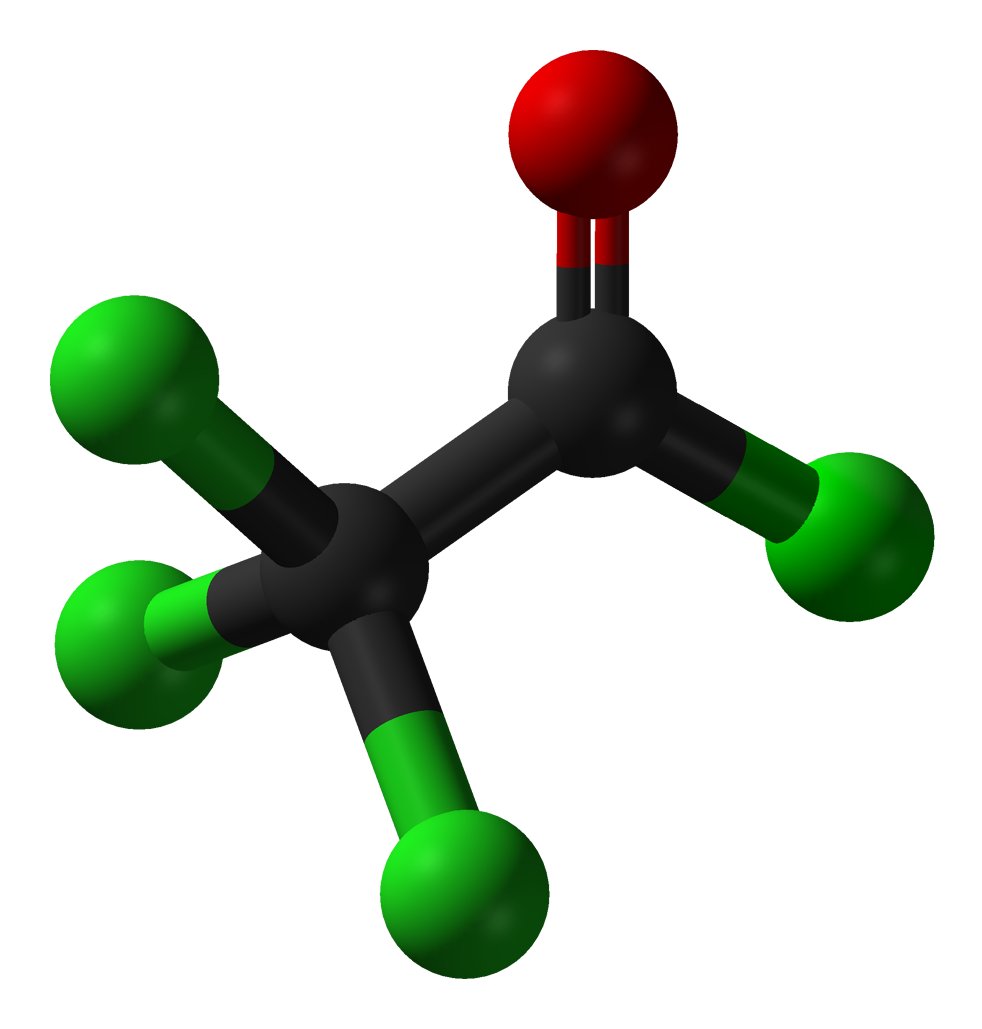
Ball-and-stick model

Names
- Preferred IUPAC name Trichloroacetyl chloride
- Other names 2,2,2-Trichloroacetyl chloride

Identifiers
CAS Number	76-02-8
3D model (JSmol)	Interactive image
ChemSpider	6180
ECHA InfoCard	100.000.843
EC Number	200-926-7
PubChem CID	6420
UNII	9SN86T76Y6
UN number	2442
CompTox Dashboard (EPA)	DTXSID9034070
- InChI: InChI=1S/C2Cl4O/c3-1(7)2(4,5)6 Key: PVFOMCVHYWHZJE-UHFFFAOYSA-N; InChI=1/C2Cl4O/c3-1(7)2(4,5)6 Key: PVFOMCVHYWHZJE-UHFFFAOYAJ
- SMILES: ClC(Cl)(Cl)C(Cl)=O

Properties
Chemical formula	C_{2}Cl_{4}O
Molar mass	181.832 g/mol
Density	1.62 g/cm^{3} at 20 °C
Boiling point	117.9 °C (244.2 °F; 391.0 K)
Solubility	miscible with diethyl ether

Thermochemistry
Std enthalpy of formation (Δ_{f}H^{⦵}_{298})	−280.0 kJ•mol^{−1}

Hazards
- GHS labelling
Pictograms	(GHS05: Corrosive) (GHS06: Toxic) (GHS07: Exclamation mark)
Signal word	Danger
Hazard statements	H302, H314, H330
Precautionary statements	P260, P264, P270, P271, P280, P284, P301+P312, P301+P330+P331, P303+P361+P353, P304+P340, P305+P351+P338, P310, P320, P330, P363, P403+P233, P405
Safety data sheet (SDS)	Oxford MSDS
- Except where otherwise noted, data are given for materials in their standard state (at 25 °C [77 °F], 100 kPa). verify (what is ?) Infobox references

Trichloroacetyl chloride is the organochlorine compound with the formula CCl_{3}COCl. Iti s the acyl chloride of trichloroacetic acid.

It is produced industrially by photooxidation of tetrachloroethylene:

CCl_{2}=CCl_{2} + O → CCl_{3}COCl

The method proceeds by the isomerization of tetrachloroethylene oxide.

It can also be formed by chlorination acetyl chloride or acetaldehyde in the presence of activated charcoal

== Reactions and uses ==
It is used in the manufacture of pharmaceuticals and plant protection compounds.

In organic synthesis, Trichloroacetyl chloride serves as a precursor to dichloroketene:

CCl_{3}COCl + Zn → CCl_{2}=C=O + ZnCl_{2}
