= 1,1-Diiodoethane =

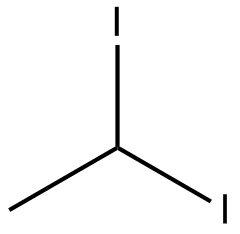
Skeletal model
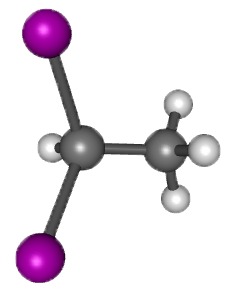
Ball and stick model

Names
- Preferred IUPAC name 1,1-Diiodoethane
- Other names Ethylidene iodide

Identifiers
CAS Number	594-02-5
3D model (JSmol)	Interactive image
ChemSpider	62202
ECHA InfoCard	100.008.930
EC Number	209-821-0
PubChem CID	68980
CompTox Dashboard (EPA)	DTXSID70208117
- InChI: InChI=1S/C2H4I2/c1-2(3)4/h2H,1H3 Key: JNVXRQOSRUDXDY-UHFFFAOYSA-N
- SMILES: CC(I)I

Properties
Chemical formula	C_{2}H_{4}I_{2}
Molar mass	281.863 g·mol^{−1}
Density	3.0±0.1 g/cm^{3}
Boiling point	154.7±23.0 °C
Solubility	most organic solvents

Hazards
- GHS labelling
Pictograms	(GHS06: Toxic) (GHS07: Exclamation mark)
Signal word	Warning
Precautionary statements	P261, P264, P270, P271, P280, P301+P312, P302+P352, P304+P340, P305+P351+P338, P312, P321, P330, P332+P313, P337+P313, P362, P403+P233, P405, P501
Flash point	63.7±18.1 °C
- Except where otherwise noted, data are given for materials in their standard state (at 25 °C [77 °F], 100 kPa). Infobox references

1,1-Diiodoethane is an organic saturated haloalkane containing iodine with formula CH_{3}CHI_{2}.

== Preparation ==
1,1-Diiodoethane can be synthesized from gem-dihaloalkanes. The starting material is 1,1-dichloroethane, and iodoethane is a source of iodine. In the presence of aluminium trichloride, 1,1-dichloroethane will converted to 1,1-diiodoethane.

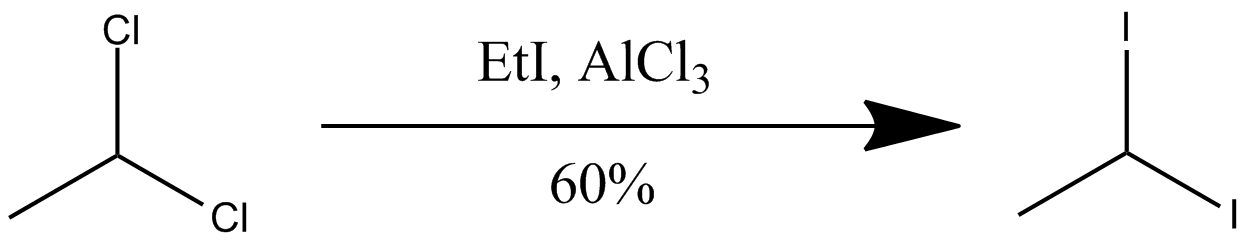
The preparation of 1,1-diiodoethane from gem-dihaloalkanes

To be specific, mix 0.4 mol (~39.6 g) of 1,1-dichloroethane with 1.2 mol (~187 g) of ethyl iodide, and ~2.0 g of aluminium chloride. Heat for three hours using steam bath. Then, wash the mixture with H_{2}O and NaHSO_{3} respectively, and dry with MgSO_{4}. By boiling at 76-76 °C and 25 mmHg, about 67.3 g of product will be received when distilled.

The alternative method, which does not require 1,1-dichloroethane, is the reaction of iodine, triethylamine and hydrazone of acetaldehyde. Using 1 mol of acetaldehyde, about 95 g, which is 34% from acetaldehyde, of 1,1-diiodoethane formed.

== See also ==
- 1,2-Diiodoethylene
- 1,2-Difluoroethane
- 1,2-Diiodoethane
- 1,1-Dibromoethane
- 1,2-Difluoroethylene
