= 1,1,1,2-Tetrachloroethane =

Chemical compound

Skeletal formula of 1,1,1,2-tetrachloroethane
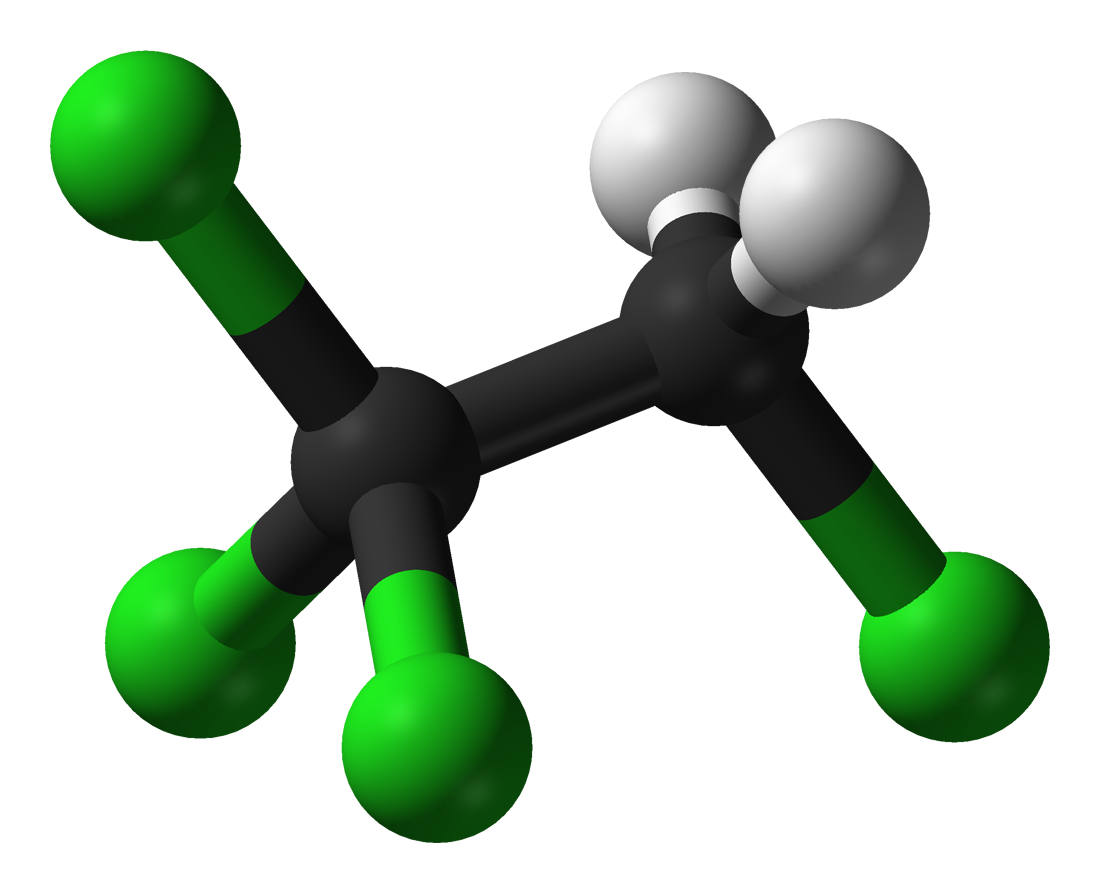
Ball-and-stick model of 1,1,1,2-tetrachloroethane

Names
- Preferred IUPAC name 1,1,1,2-Tetrachloroethane
- Other names R-130a, acetylidene tetrachloride, asymmetrical tetrachloroethane, perchloride of formyl or terchlorinated hydrochloric ether (archaic)

Identifiers
CAS Number	630-20-6
3D model (JSmol)	Interactive image; Interactive image
ChEBI	CHEBI:34024
ChEMBL	ChEMBL155816
ChemSpider	11911
ECHA InfoCard	100.010.124
KEGG	C14705
PubChem CID	12418
UNII	0S5MKE574X
CompTox Dashboard (EPA)	DTXSID2021317
- InChI: InChI=1S/C2H2Cl4/c3-1-2(4,5)6/h1H2 Key: QVLAWKAXOMEXPM-UHFFFAOYSA-N; InChI=1/C2H2Cl4/c3-1-2(4,5)6/h1H2 Key: QVLAWKAXOMEXPM-UHFFFAOYAE
- SMILES: C(C(Cl)(Cl)Cl)Cl; ClCC(Cl)(Cl)Cl

Properties
Chemical formula	C_{2}H_{2}Cl_{4}
Molar mass	167.84 g·mol^{−1}
Appearance	Clear liquid
Density	1.5532 g/cm^{3}
Melting point	−70.2 °C (−94.4 °F; 203.0 K)
Boiling point	130.5 °C (266.9 °F; 403.6 K)
Solubility in water	0.1% (20°C)
Vapor pressure	14 mmHg (25°C)

Hazards
- NIOSH (US health exposure limits)
PEL (Permissible)	none
REL (Recommended)	Handle with caution in the workplace.
IDLH (Immediate danger)	N.D.
- Except where otherwise noted, data are given for materials in their standard state (at 25 °C [77 °F], 100 kPa). verify (what is ?) Infobox references

1,1,1,2-Tetrachloroethane is a chlorinated hydrocarbon. It is a colorless liquid with a sweet chloroform-like odor. It is used as a solvent and in the production of wood stains and varnishes. It is an isomer of 1,1,2,2-tetrachloroethane.

It was likely discovered by Auguste Laurent along with the 1,1,2,2-tetrachloroethane isomer and trichloroethylene in 1836. 1,1,1,2-Tetrachloroethane was named "perchloride of formyl" in Leopold Gmelin's Hand-book of Chemistry, the same name was also used for chloroform.

== Production ==
1,1,1,2-Tetrachloroethane can be obtained by a two-step addition reaction of acetylene with chlorine (via dichloroethylene), but this mainly produces 1,1,2,2-tetrachloroethane.

C_{2}H_{2} + Cl_{2} → C_{2}H_{2}Cl_{2}

C_{2}H_{2}Cl_{2} + Cl_{2} → C_{2}H_{2}Cl_{4}

It can be obtained directly by chlorination of 1,1,2-trichloroethane:

CHCl_{2}−CH_{2}Cl + Cl_{2} → CCl_{3}−CH_{2}Cl + HCl

== Safety ==
IARC has classified 1,1,1,2-tetrachloroethane as a possible carcinogen for humans in 2014.

== See also ==
- 1,1,2,2-Tetrachloroethane
