= Tetrachloroethylene =

Chemical compound

Tetrachloroethylene
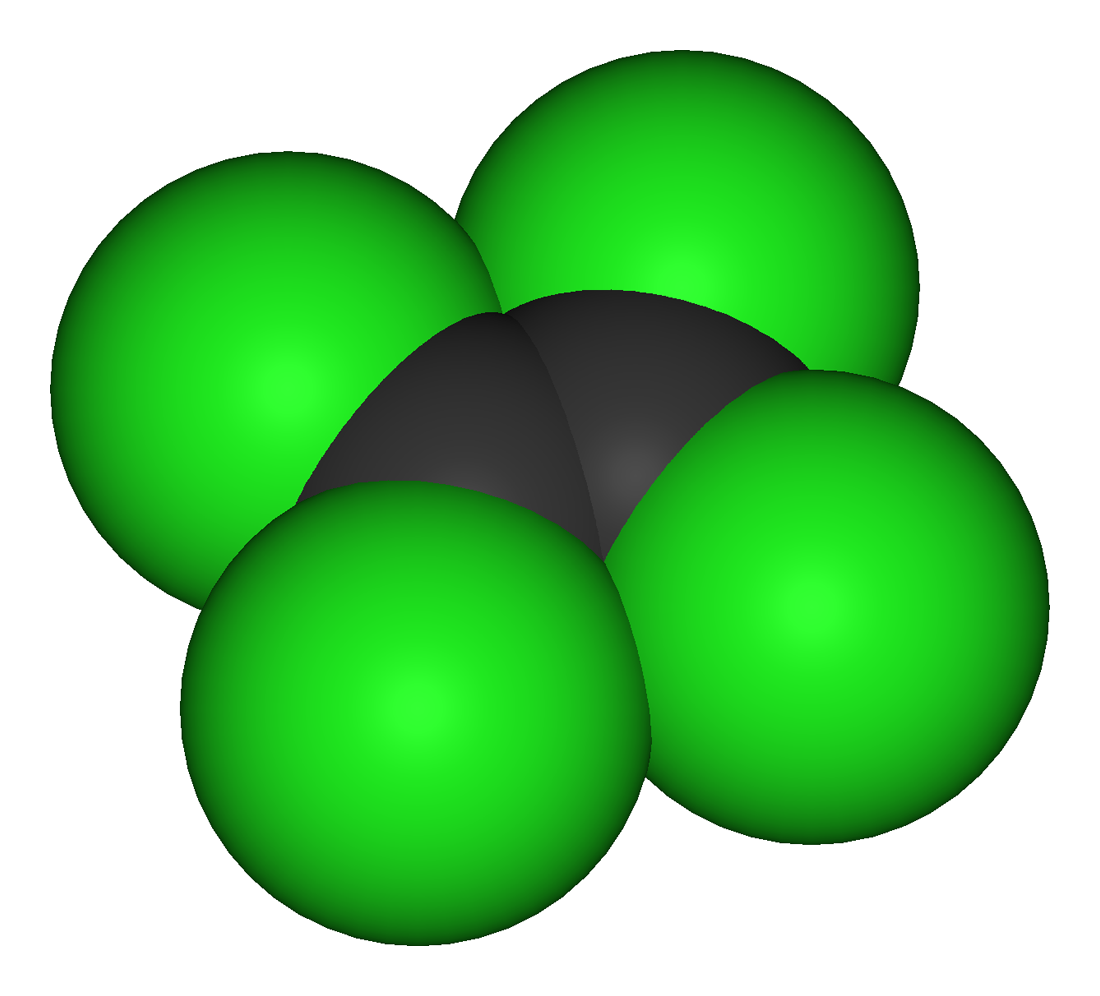
Tetrachloroethylene
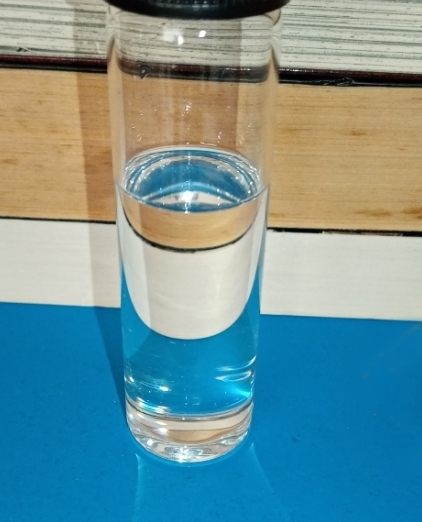

Names
- Preferred IUPAC name Tetrachloroethene
- Other names: Carbon bichloride; Carbon dichloride; Carboneum Dichloratum; Dicarbon Tetrachloride; Ethylene tetrachloride; Perchloroethene; Perchloroethylene (Note: Previously spelt as perchlorethylene); Protochloride of carbon

Identifiers
CAS Number	127-18-4
3D model (JSmol)	Interactive image
Abbreviations	PCE; Perc; Per; Perchlor
Beilstein Reference	1304635
ChEBI	CHEBI:17300
ChEMBL	ChEMBL114062
ChemSpider	13837281
ECHA InfoCard	100.004.388
EC Number	204-825-9
Gmelin Reference	101142
KEGG	C06789
PubChem CID	31373
RTECS number	KX3850000
UNII	TJ904HH8SN
UN number	1897
CompTox Dashboard (EPA)	DTXSID2021319
- InChI: InChI=1S/C2Cl4/c3-1(4)2(5)6 Key: CYTYCFOTNPOANT-UHFFFAOYSA-N; InChI=1/C2Cl4/c3-1(4)2(5)6 Key: CYTYCFOTNPOANT-UHFFFAOYAO
- SMILES: ClC(Cl)=C(Cl)Cl

Properties
Chemical formula	C_{2}Cl_{4}
Molar mass	165.82 g·mol^{−1}
Appearance	Clear, very refractive, colorless liquid
Odor	Mild, sharp and sweetish
Density	1.623 g/cm^{3}
Melting point	−22.0 °C (−7.6 °F; 251.2 K)
Boiling point	121 °C (250 °F; 394 K)
Solubility in water	0.15 g/L
log P	2.53 (23 °C (73 °F; 296 K))
Vapor pressure	1.73 kPa (0.251 psi) (20 °C (68 °F; 293 K)); 2.53 kPa (0.367 psi)
Magnetic susceptibility (χ)	−81.6×10^{−6} cm^{3}/mol
Refractive index (n_{D})	1.505
Viscosity	0.89 cP

Hazards
- Occupational safety and health (OHS/OSH)
Main hazards	Inhalation of vapours can cause anaesthesia and respiratory irritation. Causes irritation in contact with skin and eyes with no residual injury. Suspected of causing cancer. Known groundwater contaminant.
- GHS labelling
Pictograms	(GHS08: Health hazard) (GHS07: Exclamation mark) (GHS09: Environmental hazard)
Signal word	Warning
Hazard statements	H315, H317, H319, H336, H351, H411
Precautionary statements	P201, P202, P261, P264, P271, P272, P273, P280, P302+P352, P304+P340+P312, P305+P351+P338, P308+P313, P333+P313, P337+P313, P362, P371, P403+P233, P405, P501
NFPA 704 (fire diamond)	2 0 0
- Lethal dose or concentration (LD, LC)
LD_{50} (median dose)	3420 mg/kg (oral, rat); 2629 mg/kg (oral, rat); >10,000 mg/kg (dermal, rat)
LC_{50} (median concentration)	4000 ppm (rat, 4-hour); 5200 ppm (mouse, 4-hour); 4964 ppm (rat, 8-hour)
- NIOSH (US health exposure limits)
PEL (Permissible)	TWA 100 ppm; C 200 ppm (for 5 minutes in any 3-hour period); 300 ppm
IDLH (Immediate danger)	150 ppm

Related compounds
Related analogous organohalides	Tetrafluoroethylene; Tetrabromoethylene; Tetraiodoethylene
Related compounds	Ethylene; Carbon tetrachloride; Chloroethylene; 1,1-Dichloroethylene; 1,2-Dichloroethylene; Trichloroethylene; 1,1,2,2-Tetrachloroethane; Hexachloroethane

Supplementary data page
- Tetrachloroethylene (data page)
- Except where otherwise noted, data are given for materials in their standard state (at 25 °C [77 °F], 100 kPa). verify (what is ?) Infobox references

Tetrachloroethylene, also known as perchloroethylene or under the systematic name tetrachloroethene, and abbreviations such as perc, and PCE, is a chlorocarbon with the formula Cl_{2}C=CCl_{2}. It is a volatile, non-flammable, stable, colorless and dense liquid widely used for dry cleaning of fabrics and as a metal degreasing solvent, formerly as an oral anthelmintic. It has a mild, sweet, sharp odor, detectable by most people at a concentration of 50 ppm.

Tetrachloroethylene is produced industrially by the chlorination or oxychlorination of hydrocarbons. Approximately a million tons of tetrachloroethylene are produced every year and the production amount is increasing every year, especially to be used in the production of HCFC and HFC refrigerants. It was first obtained from the thermal decomposition of hexachloroethane in 1820 by the English chemist-physicist Michael Faraday.

Tetrachloroethylene is more stable compared to other chlorinated solvents and similar compounds as it does not react easily, does not tend to polymerize and has lower toxicity. Inhalation of vapours may affect the central nervous system, causing drowsiness, numbness, hallucinations and loss of consciousness. Exposure to high concentrations may irritate the skin and respiratory tract. It has been suspected of causing cancer in humans, but the evidence is limited. It was classified as "group 2A - probably carcinogenic" by the International Agency for Research on Cancer in 1995 due to sufficient evidence in some experimental animals and limited evidence for humans. The majority of studies investigating people exposed to tetrachloroethylene in the workplace and the environment have not found relation between tetrachloroethylene and human cancers. It is considered an industrial organic pollutant and has caused groundwater pollution in the past due to improper disposal. Its use has been restricted in some regions due to its environmental impacts and possible effects on human health, and alternatives are being explored in sectors such as dry cleaning.

== History and production ==
The English chemist Michael Faraday first synthesized tetrachloroethylene in 1820 by thermal decomposition of hexachloroethane:

Cl_{3}C−CCl_{3} → Cl_{2}C=CCl_{2} + Cl_{2}

Tetrachloroethylene can be made by passing chloroform vapour through a red-hot tube, the side products include hexachlorobenzene and hexachloroethane, as reported in 1886.

Most tetrachloroethylene is produced by high-temperature chlorinolysis of light hydrocarbons. The method is related to Faraday's method since hexachloroethane is generated and thermally decomposes. Side products include carbon tetrachloride, hydrogen chloride, and hexachlorobutadiene.

Several other methods have been developed. When 1,2-dichloroethane is heated to 400 °C (752 °F; 673 K) with chlorine, tetrachloroethylene is produced:

ClCH_{2}−CH_{2}Cl + 3 Cl_{2} → Cl_{2}C=CCl_{2} + 4 HCl

This reaction can be catalyzed by a mixture of potassium chloride and aluminium chloride or by activated carbon. Trichloroethylene is a major byproduct, which is separated by distillation.

Worldwide production was about 1 million metric tons (980,000 long tons; 1,100,000 short tons) in 1985. In the USA, annual production was 700 million pounds (310,000 long tons) by 1978.

Although in very small amounts, tetrachloroethylene occurs naturally in volcanoes along with trichloroethylene.

== Uses ==
Tetrachloroethylene is a nonpolar solvent for organic materials. Additionally, it is volatile, relatively stable, and non-flammable. For these reasons, it became a leading solvent in dry cleaning operations worldwide beginning in the 1940s. The chemist Sylvia Stoesser (1901–1991) had suggested tetrachloroethylene to be used in dry cleaning as an alternative to highly flammable dry cleaning solvents such as naphtha. Tetrachloroethylene is the most common solvent in dry cleaning and has been considered the standard for cleaning performance. It is a highly effective cleaning solvent with a KB-value of 90. Used tetrachloroethylene is recycled by distillation at its boiling point (121 °C). Perchloroethylene can cause color bleeding/loss, especially at higher temperatures. In some cases it may damage special trims, buttons and beads on some garments. It is better for oil-based stains than more common water-soluble stains. Due to its high volatility, it does not leave permanent smell on dry-cleaned clothes. A dry cleaning machine running on perchloroethylene is called a "perc machine".

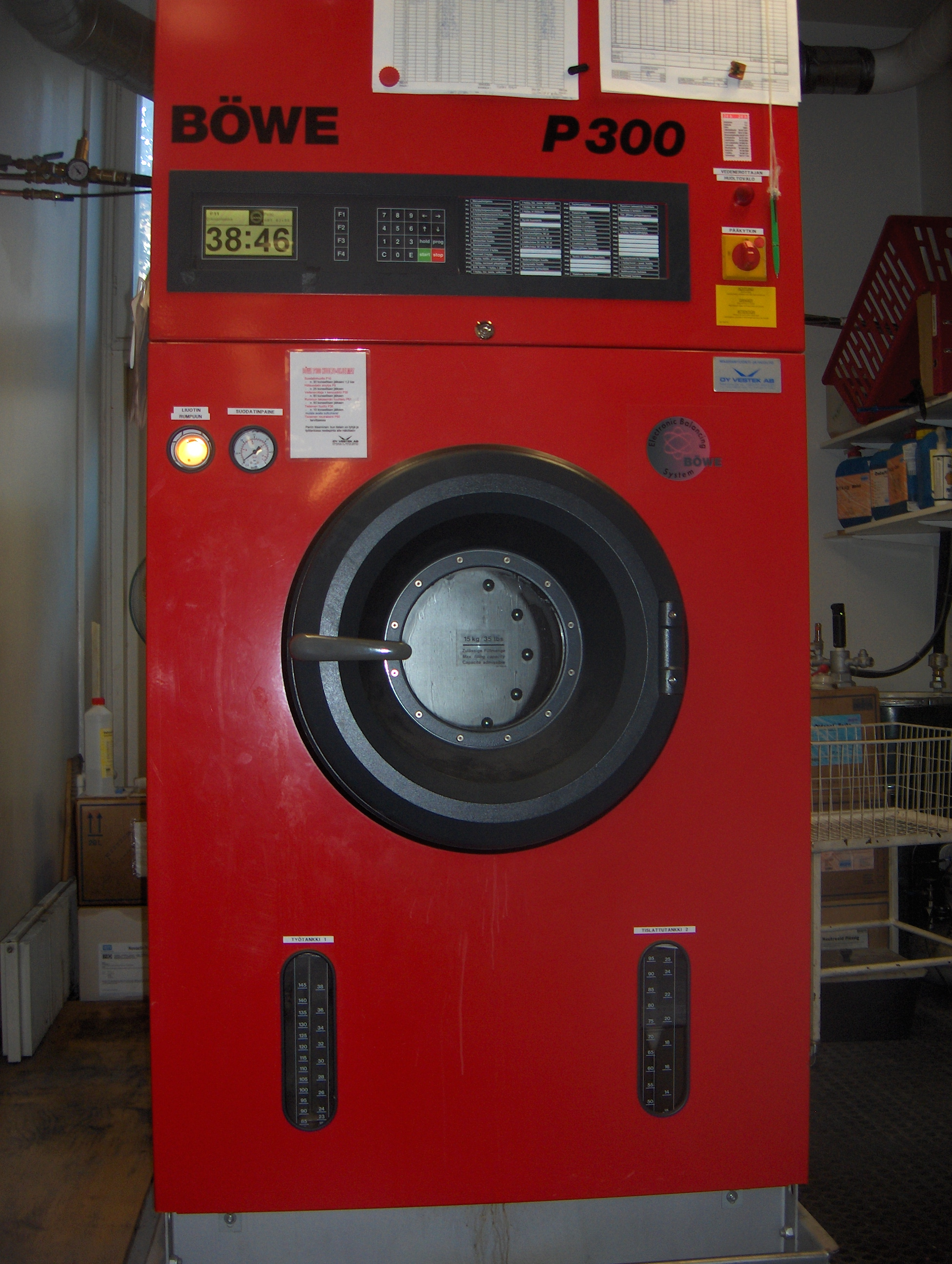
A 1990s dry cleaning machine designed for use with tetrachloroethylene, Germany.

It is also used to degrease metal parts in the automotive and other metalworking industries, usually as a mixture with other chlorocarbons. It has also been used in consumer products including paint strippers, aerosol preparations, adhesives, spot removers, and handicrafts.

A laundry symbol indicating to dry clean an item with perchloroethylene.

=== Historical applications ===
Tetrachloroethylene was once extensively used as an intermediate in the manufacture of HFC-134a and related refrigerants.

In the early 20th century, tetrachloroethene was used for the treatment of hookworm infestation. In 1925, American veterinarian Maurice Crowther Hall (1881–1938), working on anthelminthics, demonstrated the effectiveness of tetrachloroethylene in the treatment of ancylostomiasis caused by hookworm infestation in humans and animals. Before Hall tested tetrachloroethylene on himself, in 1921 he discovered the effectiveness of carbon tetrachloride on intestinal parasites and was nominated for the Nobel Prize in Physiology or Medicine, but a few years later he found tetrachloroethylene to be more effective and safer. Tetrachloroethylene treatment has played a vital role in eradicating hookworms in the United States and abroad. Hall's innovation was considered a breakthrough in medicine. It was given orally as a liquid or in capsules along with magnesium sulfate to treat the Necator americanus parasite in humans.

== Chemical properties and reactions ==
Tetrachloroethylene is a derivative of ethylene with all hydrogens replaced by chlorine. By weight, it consists of 14.5% carbon and 85.5% chlorine. It is the most stable compound among all chlorinated derivatives of ethane and ethylene. It is resistant to hydrolysis and less corrosive than other chlorinated solvents. Tetrachloroethylene does not tend to polymerise, unlike the fluorine analogue tetrafluoroethylene (C_{2}F_{4}).

Tetrachloroethylene may react violently with alkali metals, alkaline earth metals, strong alkalis (sodium hydroxide and potassium hydroxide), nitric acid, beryllium, barium and aluminium.

=== Oxidation ===
Oxidation of tetrachloroethylene by ultraviolet radiation in air produces trichloroacetyl chloride and phosgene:

4 C_{2}Cl_{4} + 3 O_{2} → 2 CCl_{3}COCl + 4 COCl_{2}

This reaction can be halted by using amines and phenols (usually N-methylpyrrole and N-methylmorpholine) as stabilisers. But the reaction can be done intentionally to produce trichloroacetyl chloride.

=== Chlorination ===
Hexachloroethane is formed when tetrachloroethylene reacts with chlorine at 50–80 °C (122–176 °F) in the presence of a small amount of iron(III) chloride (0.1%) as a catalyst:

Cl_{2}C=CCl_{2} + Cl_{2} → Cl_{3}C−CCl_{3}

CFC-113 is produced by the reaction of tetrachloroethylene with chlorine and HF in the presence of antimony pentafluoride:

Cl_{2}C=CCl_{2} + 3 HF + Cl_{2} → ClF_{2}C−CCl_{2}F + 3 HCl

=== Nitration ===
Tetrachlorodinitroethane can be obtained by nitration of tetrachloroethylene with fuming nitric acid (conc. HNO_{3} rich in nitrogen oxides) or nitrogen tetroxide:

Cl_{2}C=CCl_{2} + N_{2}O_{4} → NO_{2}Cl_{2}C−CCl_{2}NO_{2}

The preparation of this crystalline solid compound from tetrachloroethylene and nitrogen tetroxide was first described by Hermann Kolbe in 1869.

=== Thermal decomposition ===
Thermal decomposition of tetrachloroethylene begins at 400 °C (752 °F), accelerates around 600 °C (1,112 °F), and is complete at 800 °C (1,470 °F). A large number of decomposition products are produced.

== Health and safety ==
The main routes of exposure to tetrachloroethylene are by inhalation, and potentially by ingestion or exposure to eyes and the skin. Systemic effects of exposure may include depression of brain function, although with substantial acute exposure, there is risk of depressed breathing, coma or death.

The largest industrial groups exposed to tetrachloroethylene include laundry and dry cleaning occupations, metalworking, metal degreasing or forging workers.

Tetrachloroethylene is generally classified as a toxin, a human health hazard, and an environmental hazard. In 2020, the United States Environmental Protection Agency stated that "tetrachloroethylene exposure may harm the nervous system, liver, kidneys, and reproductive system, and may be harmful to unborn children", and reported that numerous toxicology agencies regard it as a carcinogen, including the UK Health Security Agency.

Reports of human injury are not well-documented, despite its wide usage in dry cleaning and degreasing, and because rigorous research of exposure conditions and the associated risks is limited. Although limited by its low volatility, tetrachloroethylene has potent anaesthetic effects upon inhalation. The risk depends on whether exposure is over minutes, hours or years.

Despite its advantages for dry cleaning and metal degreasing, cancer research and government environmental agencies have called for replacement of tetrachloroethylene from widespread commercial use. Attempts to reduce exposure and health risks have been adopted in the dry cleaning and laundry industries by introducing closed machinery systems to minimize vapor escape and optimize recycling.

=== Metabolism ===
The biological half-life of tetrachloroethylene is approximately 3 days, with about 98% of the inhaled tetrachloroethylene exhaled unchanged and only about 1–3% metabolised to tetrachloroethylene oxide, which rapidly isomerises into trichloroacetyl chloride. Trichloroacetyl chloride hydrolyses to trichloroacetic acid.

=== Neurotoxicity ===
Tetrachloroethylene can harm the nervous system, cause developmental deficits in children, impair vision, and increase the risk of psychiatric diagnoses.

=== Carcinogenicity ===
Tetrachloroethylene has been classified as "Group 2A: Probably Carcinogenic" by the International Agency for Research on Cancer (IARC) due to sufficient evidence in experimental animals and limited evidence in humans for non-Hodgkin lymphoma, urinary bladder cancers, and cancers of the esophagus and cervix. In the United States, the EPA considers tetrachloroethylene as "likely to be carcinogenic to humans by all routes of exposure" based on suggestive evidence from human epidemiology, and certain evidence from animal toxicology studies, while the US National Toxicology Program considers tetrachloroethylene as "reasonably anticipated to be a human carcinogen."

The carcinogenic potential of tetrachloroethylene remains under-studied with only limited evidence in humans, although there is sufficient proof in experimental animals that tetrachloroethylene is carcinogenic. Its high lipophilicity indicates that several organ systems, including the brain, kidneys, and liver, could be affected in tetrachloroethylene toxicity and carcinogenicity.

=== Testing for exposure ===
Tetrachloroethylene exposure can be evaluated by a breath test, analogous to breath-alcohol measurements. Also, for acute exposures, tetrachloroethylene in expired air can be measured. Tetrachloroethylene can be detected in the breath for weeks following a heavy exposure. Tetrachloroethylene and its metabolite trichloroacetic acid, can be detected in the blood.

In the European Union, the Scientific Committee on Occupational Exposure Limits recommends for tetrachloroethylene an occupational exposure limit (8-hour time-weighted average) of 20 ppm and a short-term exposure limit (15 min) of 40 ppm.

== International advisories and compliance ==
The World Health Organization published a 2010 advisory on tetrachloroethylene as a possible contaminant of indoor air and drinking water, with concern for its potential carcinogenicity. Out of suspicion that tetrachloroethylene is carcinogenic, the European Union REACH program regards tetrachloroethylene as a hazardous compound requiring a warning that it may cause serious eye irritation, skin irritation, produce an allergic skin reaction, or cause drowsiness or dizziness.

Similar advisories and regulatory mandates for tetrachlorethylene in the workplace and public exist in Australia, Canada, the United Kingdom, and the United States.

Out of concern for carcinogenic effects in dry cleaning workers, Canadian regulations for tetrachloroethylene were implemented in 2003 to limit national use to 1,600 tonnes per year; by 2025, the dry cleaner industry reduced the amount to 600 tonnes per year.

== Environmental effects ==
During typical industrial use, tetrachloroethylene may be released into the environment by evaporation and spills. In air, it undergoes degradation by reacting with hydroxyl radicals, producing phosgene, trichloroacetyl chloride, hydrogen chloride, carbon dioxide, and carbon monoxide in amounts of a few micrograms per cubic metre, existing in the atmosphere for about 100 days. Although tetrachloroethylene exists in air, surface water, and groundwater, the levels are typically low, likely causing little toxic exposure to the general public.

Tetrachloroethylene exhibits high mobility in soil, and releases to soil can travel vertically and horizontally, affecting groundwater, surface water, soil gas, and indoor air. Factors like soil permeability and local climatology can enhance or inhibit tetrachloroethylene mobilization in soil; soils with low permeability, such as clay, have been demonstrated to slow mobility, while mobility is expected to be enhanced during storm events and in higher permeability soils, such as sand and gravel. A higher organic carbon content in soil may limit tetrachloroethylene's mobility due to its high soil sorption coefficient.

When released to groundwater and surface water, a fraction of the release comingles with the water due to tetrachloroethylene's relatively low solubility. Tetrachloroethylene readily volatilizes from water and a release can present vapor intrusion concerns. Tetrachloroethylene has a greater density than water, and sufficient quantities released to groundwater and surface water can accumulate at the bottom of a water body or aquifer and result in the formation of dense non-aqueous phase liquid (DNAPL), making remediation a difficult and long process.

== Remediation and degradation ==
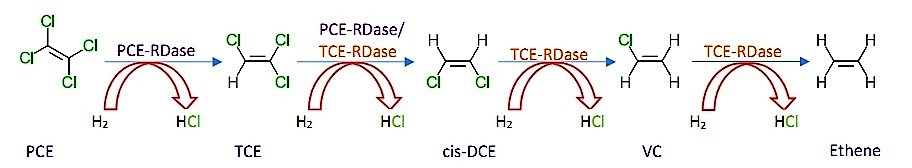
Degradation chemistry of tetrachloroethylene. Abbreviations: PCE, perchloroethylene; TCE, trichloroethylene; cis-DCE, cis-1,2-dichloroethylene; VC, vinyl chloride; ethene; RDase, reductase; H2, hydrogen gas; HCl, hydrochloric acid

Groundwater impacted by tetrachloroethylene can be remediated through several methods, including in-situ chemical oxidation (ISCO) and/or thermal treatment, bioremediation, groundwater extraction and treatment, air sparging, and natural attenuation. ISCO agents commonly used to remediate tetrachloroethylene-contaminated groundwater include zerovalent iron, permanganates, and peroxides. In-situ thermal treatment in conjunction with ISCO may also accelerate treatment.

Bioremediation usually entails reductive dechlorination under anaerobic conditions by Dehalococcoides spp. Under aerobic conditions, degradation may occur via co-metabolism by Pseudomonas sp. Products of biological reductive dechlorination include trichloroethylene, cis-1,2-dichloroethylene, vinyl chloride, ethylene and chloride.
