= 1,1,2,2-Tetrachloroethane =

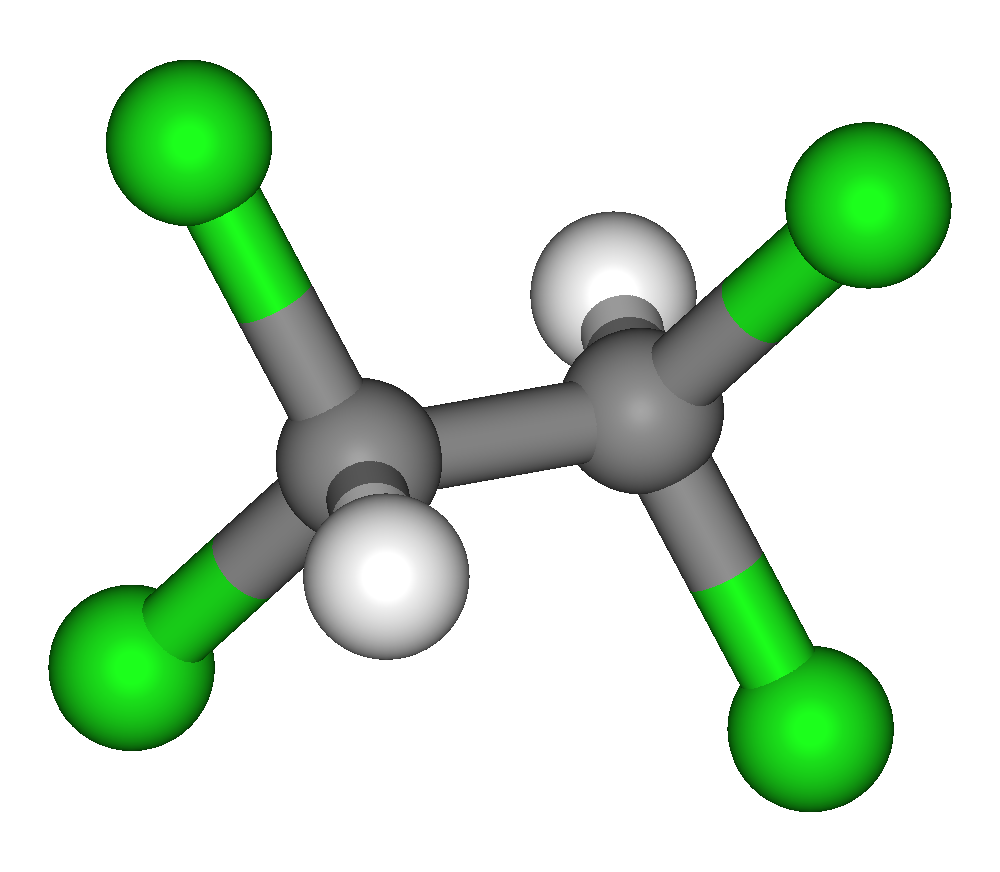

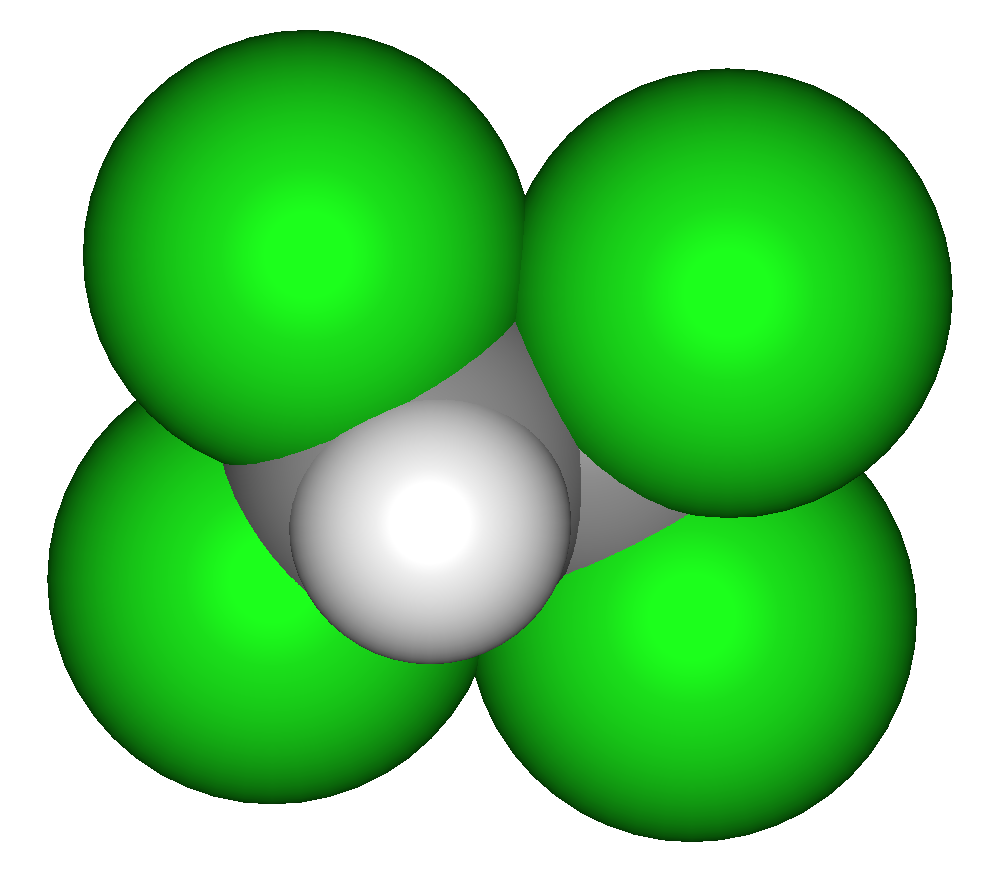

Names
- Preferred IUPAC name 1,1,2,2-Tetrachloroethane
- Other names s-Tetrachloroethane; Acetylene tetrachloride R-130; TeCA; UN 1702

Identifiers
CAS Number	79-34-5
3D model (JSmol)	Interactive image
ChEBI	CHEBI:36026
ChEMBL	ChEMBL47258
ChemSpider	6342
ECHA InfoCard	100.001.089
KEGG	C19534
PubChem CID	6591
UNII	1L6BI049XV
CompTox Dashboard (EPA)	DTXSID7021318
- InChI: InChI=1S/C2H2Cl4/c3-1(4)2(5)6/h1-2H Key: QPFMBZIOSGYJDE-UHFFFAOYSA-N; InChI=1/C2H2Cl4/c3-1(4)2(5)6/h1-2H Key: QPFMBZIOSGYJDE-UHFFFAOYAH
- SMILES: ClC(Cl)C(Cl)Cl

Properties
Chemical formula	C_{2}H_{2}Cl_{4}
Molar mass	167.848 g/mol
Appearance	Colorless to pale yellow liquid
Odor	pungent, chloroform-like
Density	1.59 g/cm^{3}
Melting point	−44 °C (−47 °F; 229 K)
Boiling point	146.5 °C (295.7 °F; 419.6 K)
Solubility in water	1 g/350 mL
Vapor pressure	5 mmHg (20°C)
Magnetic susceptibility (χ)	−89.8·10^{−6} cm^{3}/mol

Hazards
- Occupational safety and health (OHS/OSH)
Main hazards	Highly hepatotoxic
- Lethal dose or concentration (LD, LC)
LC_{50} (median concentration)	1000 ppm (rat, 4 hr)
LC_{Lo} (lowest published)	1000 ppm (rat, 4 hr); 643 ppm (mouse, 2 hr); 2714 ppm (cat, 45 min)
- NIOSH (US health exposure limits)
PEL (Permissible)	TWA 5 ppm (35 mg/m^{3}) [skin]
REL (Recommended)	Ca TWA 1 ppm (7 mg/m^{3}) [skin]
IDLH (Immediate danger)	Ca [100 ppm]
- Except where otherwise noted, data are given for materials in their standard state (at 25 °C [77 °F], 100 kPa). verify (what is ?) Infobox references

1,1,2,2-Tetrachloroethane (TeCA), also known as acetylene tetrachloride and by the brand names Bonoform, Cellon and Westron, is an organochloride. It is a dense, colorless, non-flammable liquid with a sweet odor, used as an industrial solvent and as a separation agent. TeCA is toxic to humans via inhalation, ingestion and skin absorption. After exposure, nausea, dizziness or liver damage may occur.

== History ==
1,1,2,2-Tetrachloroethane and 1,1,1,2-Tetrachloroethane were discovered by Auguste Laurent in 1836.

1,1,2,2-tetrachloroethane was used in large amounts to produce other chemicals like trichloroethylene, tetrachloroethylene, and 1,2-dichloroethylene.

Because of its high hepatotoxic effects on humans, the production and use of 1,1,2,2-tetrachloroethane have decreased significantly and is no longer widely used as an end-product. It is however still generated as a byproduct and as an intermediate product during manufacturing, where low levels of the chemical have been detected in the air.

== Uses ==
1,1,2,2-Tetrachloroethane has been used as an industrial solvent since the 1910s when it was widely used in cellulose acetate "dope" formulations, under the name "Cellon". Its use in dope formulations decreased towards the 1920s as its toxicity became more known.

Other uses for the substance include paint stripping, acting as a denaturation agent for alcohol, as a solvent for waxes & varnishes, and in the extraction of oils and degreasing of metals.

1,1,2,2-Tetrachloroethane is currently used as a feedstock in the production of 1,2-dichloroethylene, trichloroethylene and tetrachloroethylene.

== Synthesis ==
There are a few different ways to synthesise 1,1,2,2-tetrachloroethane. 1,1,2,2-tetrachloroethane can be produced by the catalytic addition of chlorine to ethylene which yields the highest purity. It is also produced by direct chlorination or oxychlorination utilizing ethylene as feedstock and by catalytic chlorination of ethane or chlorination of 1,2- dichloroethane. 1,1,2,2-Tetrachloroethane is always produced in closed systems to obtain the highest yield. Common side products that are created during the synthesis of 1,1,2,2-tetrachloroethane are 1,2-Dichloroethane and trichloroethylene (in the presence of heat).

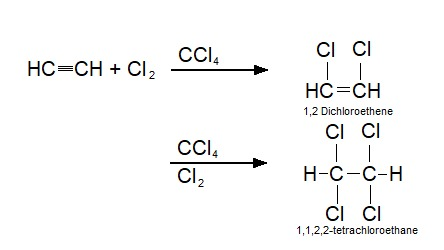
Synthesis of 1,1,2,2-Tetrachloroethane

== Toxicity ==
Alcohol increases the metabolism of 1,1,2,2-tetrachloroethane (TeCA) and can intensify its effects. Humans who consume alcohol might be at an increased risk for all toxic effects from TeCA. This is also a case for several other chlorinated aliphatic hydrocarbons. An investigation showed that combining alcohol with TeCA increases the relative weight of rats exposed to the latter, indicating an enlarged activity of TeCA.

=== Metabolism ===
The metabolism is believed to involve cytochrome (CYP) P450. Experiments showed that biotransformation reactions increased with chronic ethanol consumption and fasting.

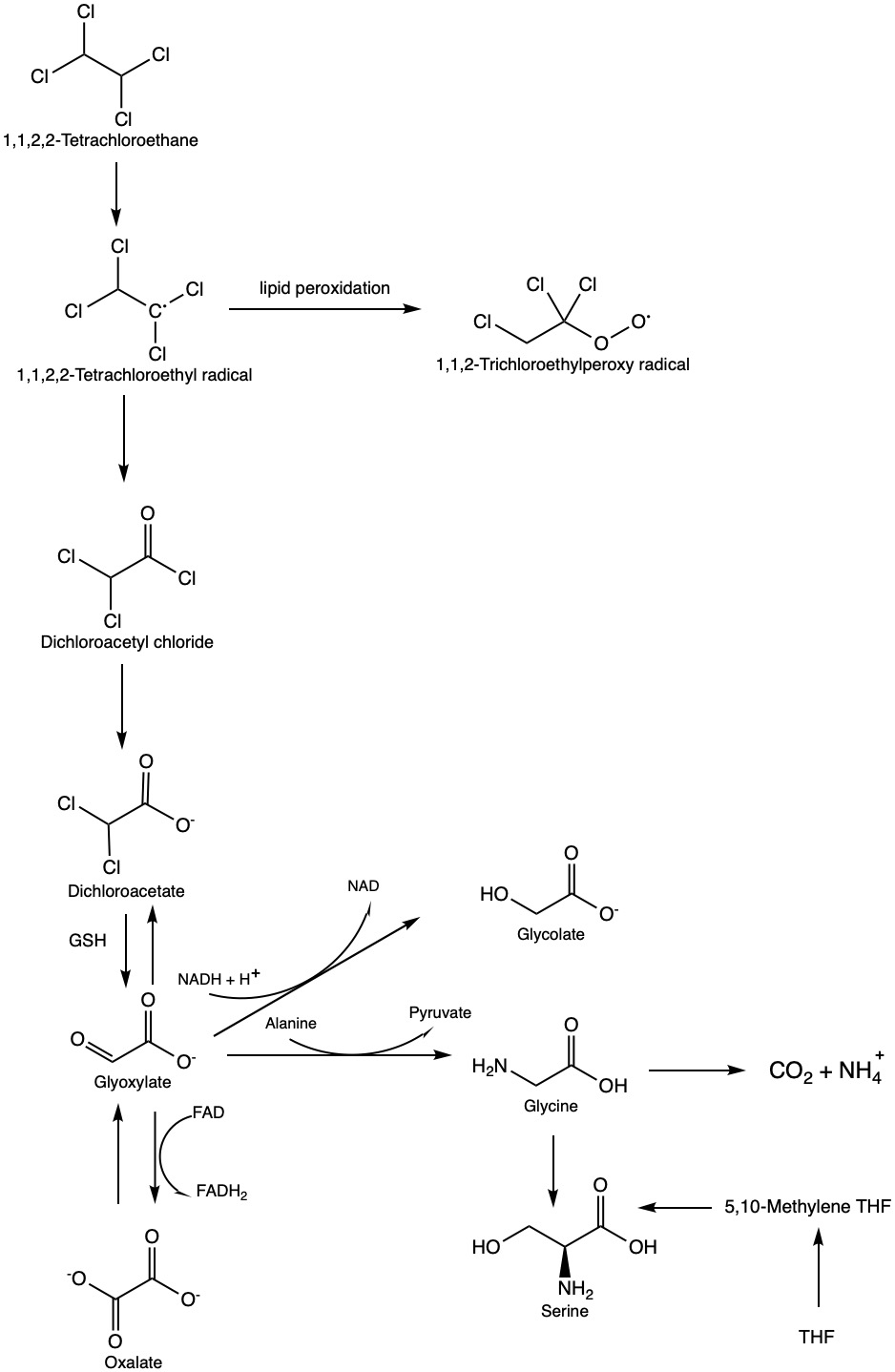
Proposed metabolism of 1,1,2,2-Tetrachloroethane

=== Mechanism of action ===
1,1,2,2,-Tetrachloroethane (TeCA) can be rapidly and extensively absorbed from oral and inhalation exposure. In animal studies the oral take up was reported as 70-100% and 40-97% oral uptake in human inhalation. TeCA is a small, volatile, lipophilic molecule; TeCA can be readily absorbed from respiratory and gastrointestinal tracts. Absorption with passive diffusion is the most likely mechanism.

After TeCA is absorbed in the body, it is readily distributed throughout the body via passive diffusion. TeCA will most likely accumulate in lipid-rich tissues, such as the liver. Urinary elimination occurs as metabolites, including formic acid, glyoxalic acid, trichloroacetic acid and trichloroethanol.

Already mentioned before passive diffusion is an important mechanism, because it is most likely the major mechanism of excretion.

TeCA metabolism to reactive products plays a key role in the toxicity of TeCA. In rats, microsomal and nuclear cytochrome P450 enzymes are implicated in the metabolism with TeCA, releasing biologically active compounds as; aldehydes, alkenes, acids and free radicals. Formation of active metabolites is likely the mechanism for the toxicity.

Mechanism for neurological effects is not yet determined and therefore can not be described, TeCA might play a role. The property of the readily passive diffusion to lipid-rich tissues allows it to interfere with neural membrane function, central nervous system depression, behavioral changes and anesthesia. but there are no studies of TeCA's mechanism of neuronal effects.

Mode of action in TeCA's carcinogenic effect is not completely determined. Several studies of TeCA have reported increases in the number of hepatocytes in mitosis, but the role these effects might have of TeCA on carcinogenicity is not evaluated. It suggests that TeCA may have promoting and initiating activity.

=== Toxicokinetics ===
The most common health effect was found to be on the liver following 1,1,2,2-tetrachloroethane (TeCA) exposure. The studies for this have been divided into the four different Toxicokinetic phases: Adsorption, Distribution, Metabolism and Excretion (ADME). Three exposure routes have been studied to examine the effects depending on the entry route of TeCA into the body.

1. Oral exposure: The experiment for the oral exposure was done by administering oral doses of radioactively labeled TeCA by gavage in corn oil to rats and mice. Followed by measuring the radioactivity in the expired air and urine. a) Adsorption: With a measured radioactivity of 65%-73% the conclusion made was that the compound is almost completely absorbed orally. b) Distribution: Hepatic protein binding was observed by purifying the liver protein. Furthermore, adverse effects were seen in liver, kidney and testes leading to the conclusion that TeCA is distributed to these tissues. c) Metabolism: see experiments on Metabolism routes d) Excretion: After 72h more than 90% of the dose was excreted in metabolized or unchanged form. The largest part was excreted in breath followed by urine and the least amount of TeCA was recovered in feces. 20%-30% were retained in skin and carcass.
2. Inhalation exposure: The experiment on the health effects following inhalation exposure was performed on human volunteers for adsorption and excretion studies and on animals for distribution and metabolism. A bulb containing 38C1-labeled TeCA was inserted into their mouths and the volunteers inhaled deeply, held their breath for 20 seconds, and exhaled. The excretion of the radiolabeled TeCA was measured. a) Adsorption: The results of the study showed that 97% TeCA was adsorbed in a single breath. b) Distribution: After exposure to mice and rats via inhalation adverse effects were observed in liver and kidney indicating a systemic distribution of TeCA to these tissues. c) Metabolism: Following 6 hours of inhalation exposure the level of radioactively labeled TeCA was measured at a concentration of 7.73% non metabolized in expired air. 72 hours later 1.78% was measured. d) Excretion: One hour after exposure 3% of inhaled TeCA was measured in excreted breath and 0.015% in urine.
3. Dermal exposure: To measure the health effects following dermal exposure were performed 1mL of TeCA was applied to the skin of mice and guinea pigs. a) Adsorption: Within one half hour the dose was absorbed into the skin. b) Distribution: No experiments available. c) Metabolism: No experiments available d) Excretion: The half-life of TeCA in blood was shown to be approximately two hours.

=== Health effects ===
1,1,2,2-tetrachloroethane (TeCA) has a vast array of effects spread throughout the whole body. Effects have been investigated on different systems on both humans and animals, stated respectively.

==== Gastrointestinal Effects ====
4 studies on humans after TeCA exposure determined gastrointestinal distress in the participants. Two humans exposed to 2.9 ppm TeCA for 30 minutes showed symptoms of vomiting and nausea. These symptoms also caused weight loss.

A study by Horiuchi et al. showed that a monkey frequently exposed to 1.9 ppm TeCA got anorexic and developed regular diarrhea.

==== Hematological Effects ====
Workers in an artificial silk factory that had regularly inhaled TeCA, showed elevated white blood cell levels and slight anemia.

In 1962, a study showed that 2/3 of the investigated rats exposed to 9000 ppm TeCA for 29 days had decreased red blood cells and hemoglobin levels.

==== Hepatic Effects ====
Autopsies on humans who died due to TeCA exposure showed that some humans developed hepatic failure from the TeCA, they showed jaundice and an enlarged liver. The liver is the most affected system with TeCA poisoning, causing for example apoptosis of the liver tissue.

After 60 ppm exposure rats show fatty liver degeneration. Another study determined the limit for acute hepatic failure to be at 102ppm for four hours, indicated by increases in hepatic ascorbic acid and serum glutamate dehydrogenase and decreases in serum triglycerides.

==== Ocular Effects ====
The vapors of TeCA can cause eye irritation, stinging, squinting and lacrimation in both humans and animals. This is due to direct contact of the skin and vapor rather than inhalation or digestion.

==== Neurological effects ====
Inhalation of TeCA vapor can cause dizziness, headache and tremors.

Acute symptoms in rats showed in the form of 50% motor loss when exposed to 360ppm for one hour.

==== Carcinogenic Effects ====
The National Cancer Institute performed experiments on the tumorigenicity of TeCA in rats and mice via the oral exposure route. Liver tumors were found in both species. Other studies on the tumorigenic mode of action revealed that it acts both as initiator and promoter.

=== Lethal dose ===
Due to several case study reports on individuals who died after ingesting TeCA, the approximate lethal dose was possible to be established. Since the amount consumed varied this was difficult to exactly determine. One report was shown to be 4100 mg/kg, the second 357 mg/kg and the third 1100–9600 mg/kg. Death following the ingestion occurred within 3–20 hours.

== See also ==
- 1,1,1-Trichloroethane
- 1,1,2-Trichloroethane
- 1,1,1,2-Tetrachloroethane
- Pentachloroethane
