= 1,2-Diiodoethane =

Skeletal formula of 1,2-diiodoethane
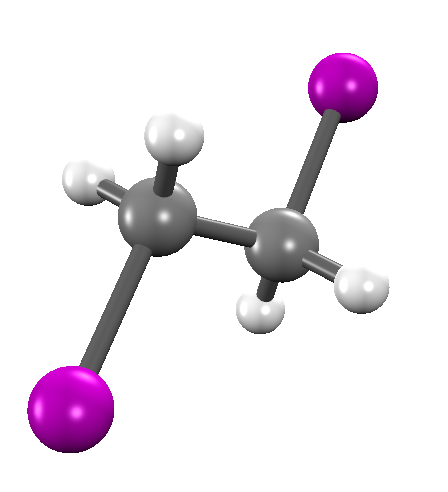
Stick and Balls model of 1,2-diiodoethane
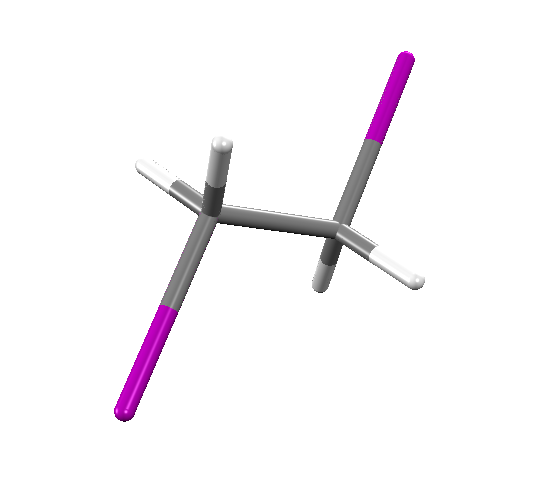
Tube model of 1,2-diiodoethane
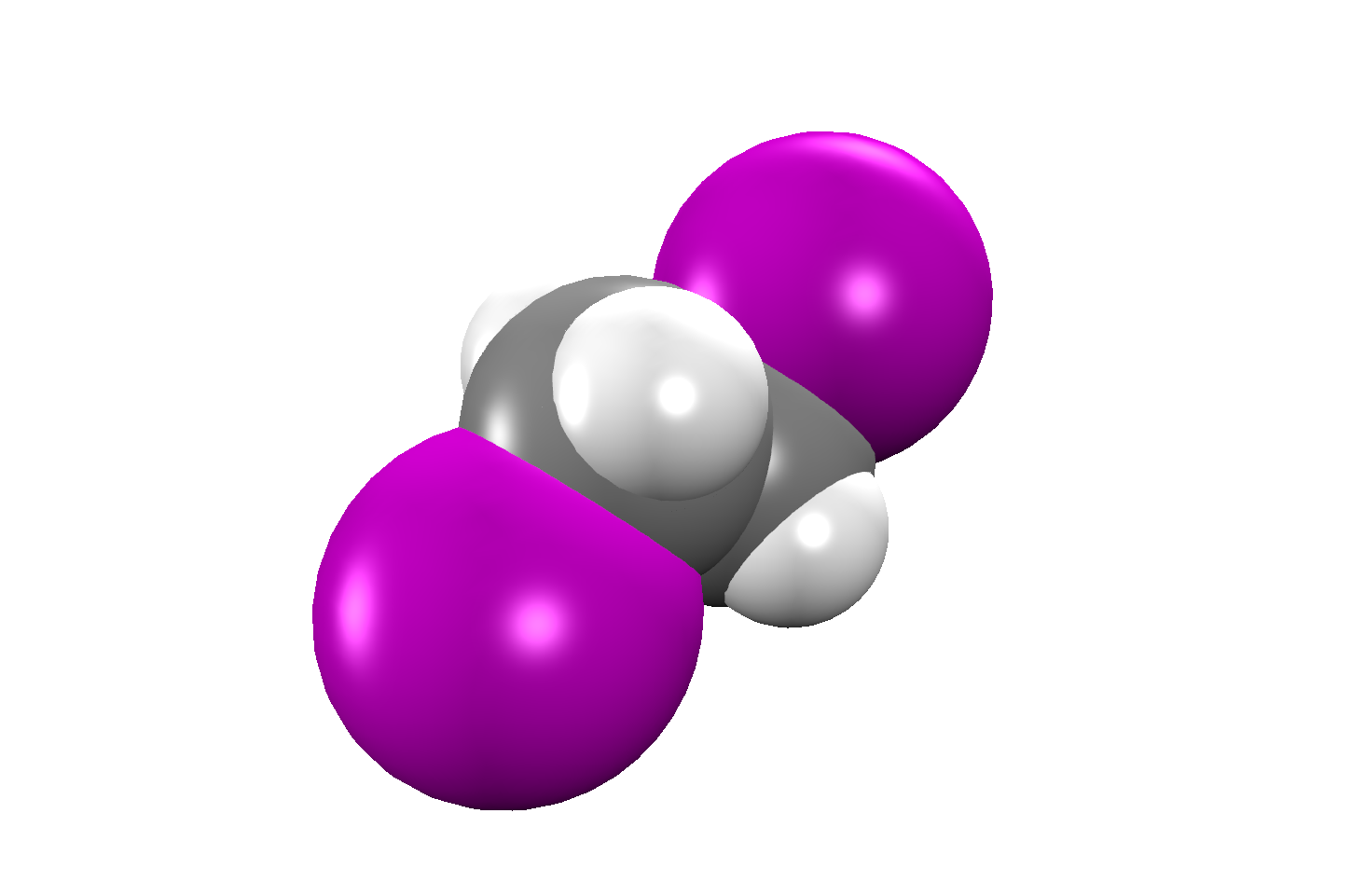
Space Filling model of 1,2-diiodoethane

Names
- Preferred IUPAC name 1,2-Diiodoethane
- Other names Ethylene iodide

Identifiers
CAS Number	624-73-7
3D model (JSmol)	Interactive image
ChemSpider	11723
ECHA InfoCard	100.009.872
PubChem CID	12224
UNII	9YH8PPH966
CompTox Dashboard (EPA)	DTXSID8060791
- InChI: InChI=1S/C2H4I2/c3-1-2-4/h1-2H2 Key: GBBZLMLLFVFKJM-UHFFFAOYSA-N; InChI=1/C2H4I2/c3-1-2-4/h1-2H2 Key: GBBZLMLLFVFKJM-UHFFFAOYAR
- SMILES: ICCI

Properties
Chemical formula	C_{2}H_{4}I_{2}
Molar mass	281.863 g·mol^{−1}
Density	2.13 g/cm^{3}
Melting point	80 to 82 °C (176 to 180 °F; 353 to 355 K)
- Except where otherwise noted, data are given for materials in their standard state (at 25 °C [77 °F], 100 kPa). Infobox references

1,2-Diiodoethane is an organoiodine compound.

== Preparation and reactions ==
1,2-Diiodoethane can be prepared by the reaction of ethylene with iodine (I_{2}):

C_{2}H_{4} + I_{2} ⇌ C_{2}H_{4}I_{2}

1,2-Diiodoethane is most commonly used in organic synthesis in the preparation of samarium(II) iodide or ytterbium(II) iodide in an inert solvent such as THF.

Sm + ICH_{2}CH_{2}I → SmI_{2} + H_{2}C=CH_{2}

== Spectral properties ==
In mass spectroscopy, 1,2-diiodoethane exhibits 5 major peaks, with the base peak showing at 155 m/z, which is the loss of one iodine atom (127 m/z).
