= Tribromoethylene =

Names
- IUPAC name tribromoethene
- Other names ethylene tribromide

Identifiers
| CAS Number | 598-16-3 |
| 3D model (JSmol) | Interactive image |
| ChemSpider | 11220 |
| ECHA InfoCard | 100.009.020 |
| EC Number | 209-920-9 |
| PubChem CID | 11712 |
| UNII | 498C7807VE |
| CompTox Dashboard (EPA) | DTXSID5044150 |
- InChI: InChI=1S/C2HBr3/c3-1-2(4)5/h1H Key: OZVJKTHTULCNHB-UHFFFAOYSA-N
- SMILES: C(=C(Br)Br)Br

Properties
| Chemical formula | C_{2}HBr_{3} |
| Molar mass | 264.742 g·mol^{−1} |
| Density | 2.5415 g/cm³ |
| Melting point | −52 °C (−62 °F; 221 K) |
| Boiling point | 164 °C (327 °F; 437 K) |

Hazards
- GHS labelling
| Pictograms | (GHS07: Exclamation mark) |
| Signal word | Warning |
| Hazard statements | H302, H312, H315, H319, H332, H335 |
| Precautionary statements | P261, P264, P264+P265, P270, P271, P280, P301+P317, P302+P352, P304+P340, P305+P351+P338, P317, P319, P321, P330, P332+P317, P337+P317, P362+P364, P403+P233, P405, P501 |
- Except where otherwise noted, data are given for materials in their standard state (at 25 °C [77 °F], 100 kPa). Infobox references

Tribromoethylene is a bromoalkene and a trihaloethylene with the chemical formula C_{2}HBr_{3}. It can be made from 1,1,2,2-tetrabromoethane.

Tribromoethylene reacts with potassium hydroxide to yield dibromoacetylene via dehydrobromination, this reaction is analogous to the synthesis of dichloroacetylene from trichloroethylene. Tribromoethylene reacts with nitric acid to form dibromoacetic acid.
