= Diiodoacetylene =

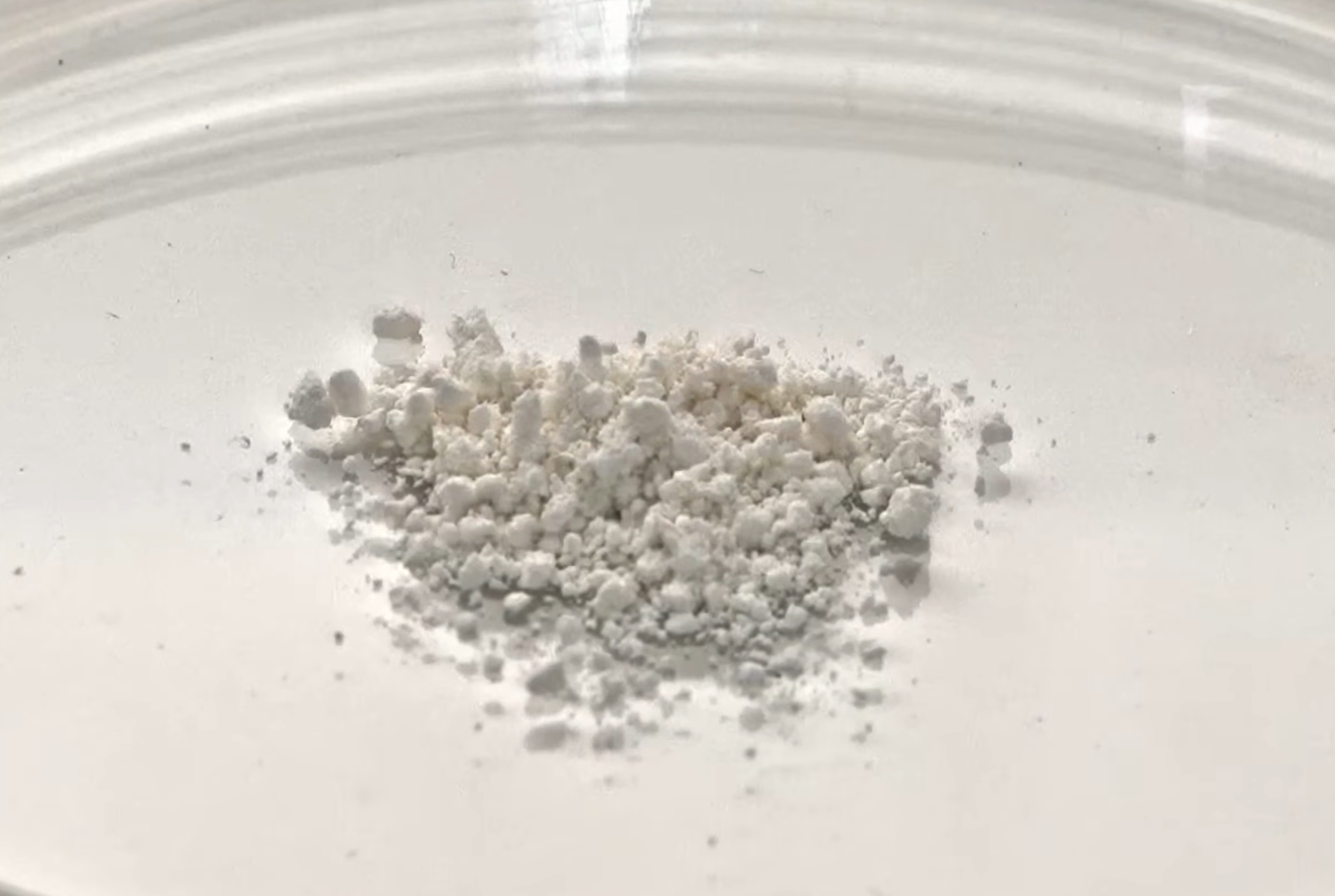

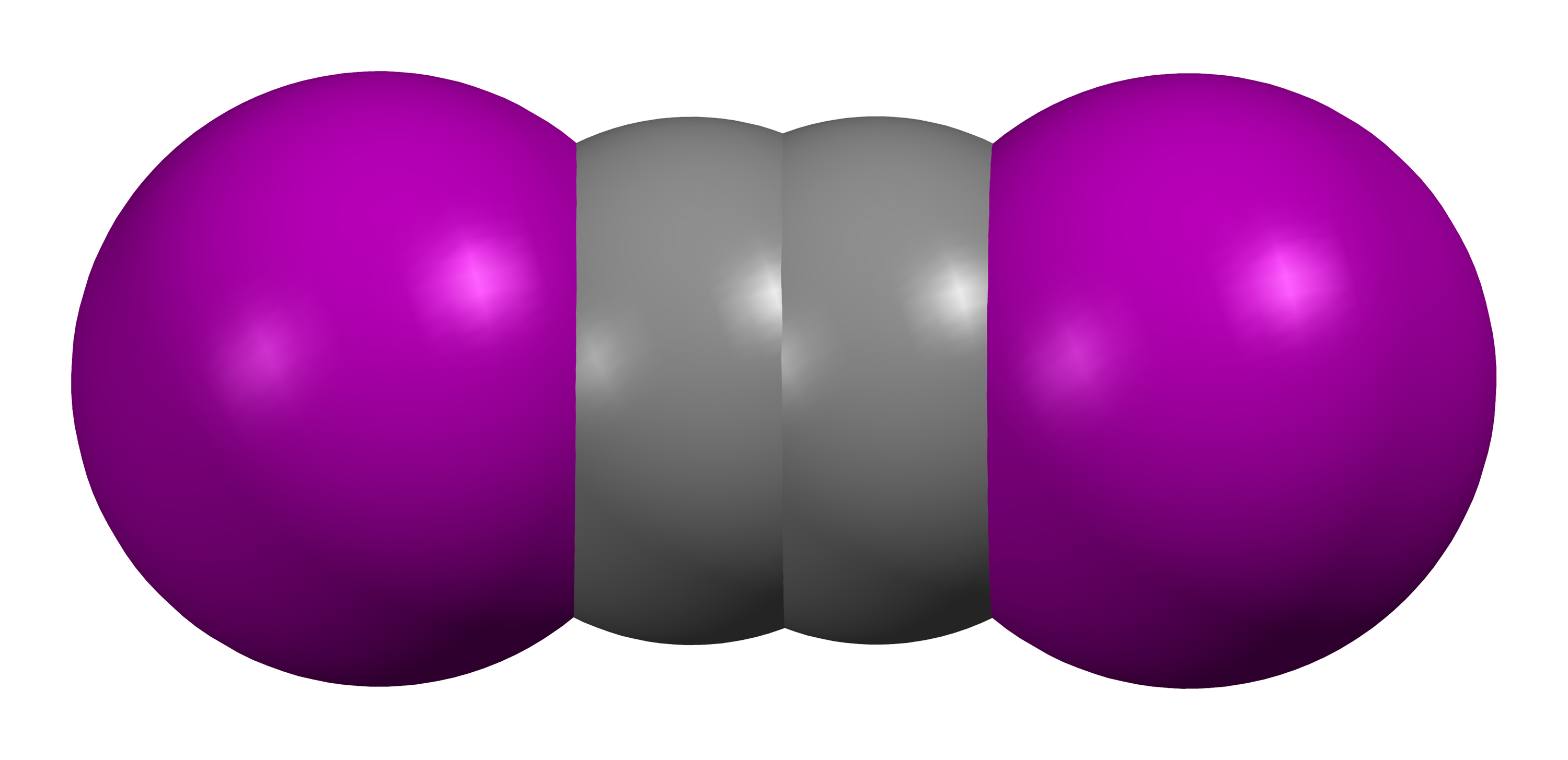

Names
- Preferred IUPAC name Diiodoethyne

Identifiers
CAS Number	624-74-8
3D model (JSmol)	Interactive image
ChemSpider	55116
PubChem CID	61170
CompTox Dashboard (EPA)	DTXSID20211459
- InChI: InChI=1S/C2I2/c3-1-2-4 Key: XANKMCMFEJCODV-UHFFFAOYSA-N
- SMILES: C(#CI)I

Properties
Chemical formula	C_{2}I_{2}
Molar mass	277.831 g·mol^{−1}
Appearance	white solid
Density	3.43 g/cm^{3}

Related compounds
Related compounds	Acetylene; Difluoroacetylene; Dichloroacetylene; Dibromoacetylene; Tetraiodoethylene; Tetraiodomethane; Hexaiodoethane; Diiodobutadiyne
- Except where otherwise noted, data are given for materials in their standard state (at 25 °C [77 °F], 100 kPa). Infobox references

Diiodoacetylene is the organoiodine compound with the formula C_{2}I_{2}. It is a white, volatile solid that dissolves in organic solvents. It is prepared by iodination of trimethylsilylacetylene. Although samples explode above 80 °C, diiodoacetylene is the most readily handled of the dihaloacetylenes. Dichloroacetylene, for example, is more volatile and more explosive. As confirmed by X-ray crystallography, diiodoacetylene is linear, with the structure I−C≡C−I. It is however a shock-, heat-, and friction-sensitive compound. Like other haloalkynes, diiodoacetylene is a strong halogen bond donor.
