= PIDA (polymer) =

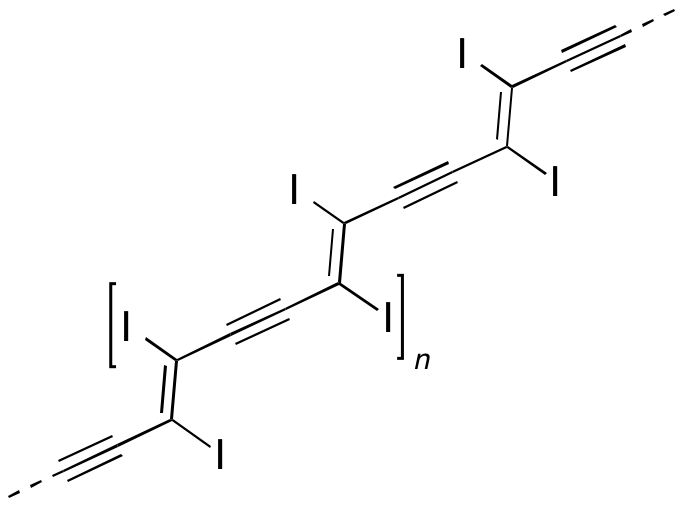

Names
- IUPAC name Poly(diiododiacetylene)
- Other names: PIDA

Identifiers
CAS Number	317320-86-8
ChemSpider	none

Properties
Appearance	Dark reflective solid
Solubility in water	Insoluble, forms aggregates

Explosive data
Shock sensitivity	Sensitive - may explode if struck

Related compounds
Related	Polydiacetylene, Diiodobutadiyne (monomer)
- Except where otherwise noted, data are given for materials in their standard state (at 25 °C [77 °F], 100 kPa). Infobox references

PIDA, or poly(diiododiacetylene), is an organic polymer that has a polydiacetylene backbone. It is one of the simplest polydiacetylenes that has been synthesized, having only iodine atoms as side chains. It is created by 1,4 topochemical polymerization of diiodobutadiyne. It has many implications in the field of polymer chemistry as it can be viewed as a precursor to other polydiacetylenes by replacing iodine atoms with other side chains using organic synthesis, or as an iodinated form of the carbon allotrope carbyne.

== Structure ==
The backbone of PIDA is highly conjugated and allows for the formation of an extended pi system along the length of the polymer. This property of PIDA allows it to transport electricity and act as a molecular wire or an organic semiconductor. Considering PIDA's backbone and the fact that Iodine atoms can easily undergo elimination, it is conceivable that PIDA can be subjected to full reductive deiodination in the presence of a Lewis base, such as pyrrolidine to yield carbyne.

== Synthesis ==
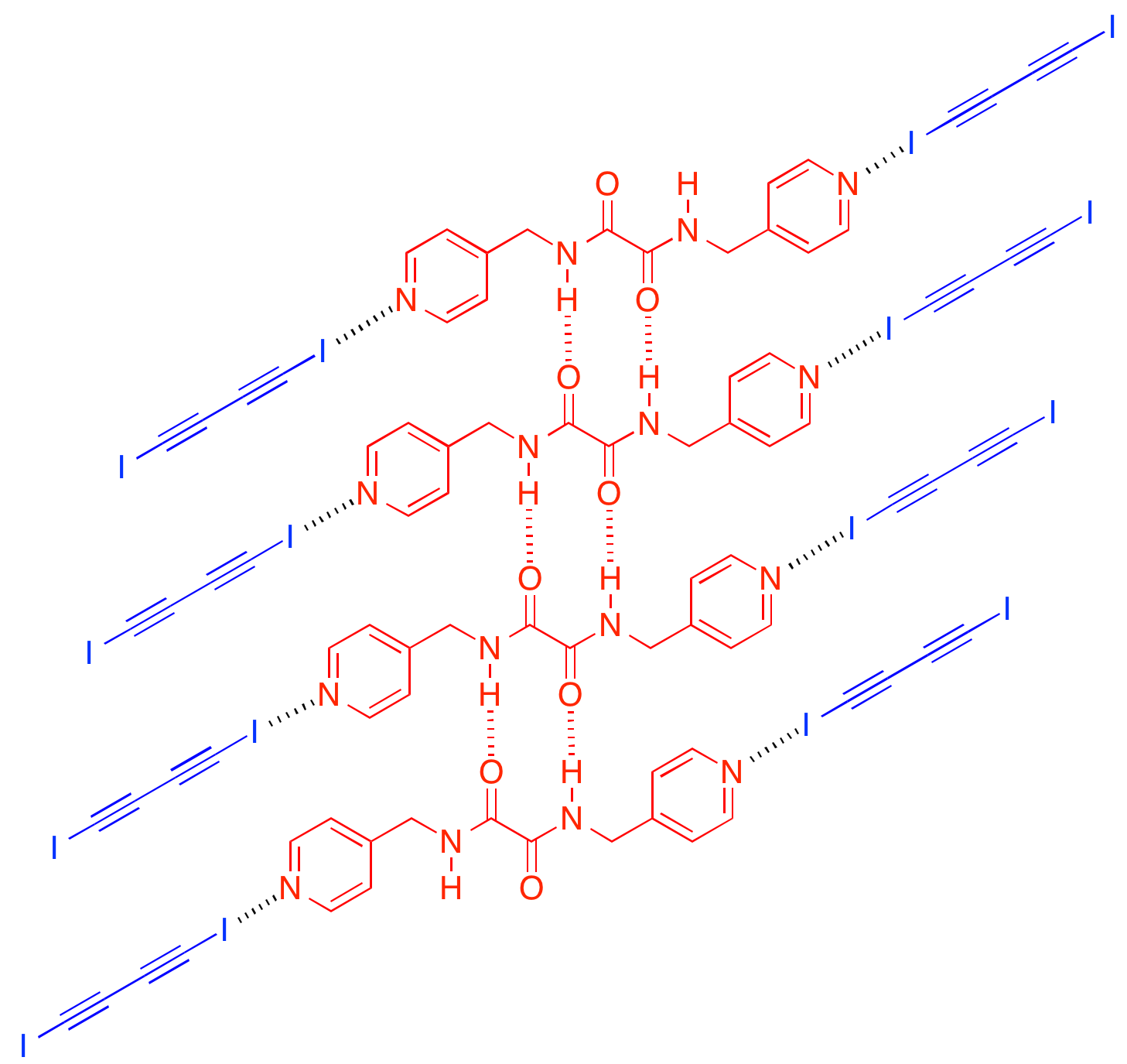
Structure of co-crystals. The oxalamide host is shown in red and diiodobutadiyne in blue.

PIDA is synthesized from diiodobutadiyne via 1,4 topochemical polymerization.

In order to meet the geometric requirements for polymerization, a host–guest strategy is used by combining a host molecule and diiodobutadiyne in solution and allowing co-crystallization to occur. This can be utilized because hosts that are most commonly used are able to bond to the diyne monomer by halogen bonding from the lewis acidic iodine atom to a lewis basic nitrogen of the host (usually a nitrile or pyridine). In order to give a proper repeat distance to the monomers (5 Å), the hosts also contain oxalamide groups that create a hydrogen bonding network throughout the crystal.

In most instances, polymerization is spontaneous upon crystallization or exposure to UV radiation/pressure.

== Reactions ==
PIDA Can undergo carbonization at high temperatures near 900 °C and reductive dehalogenation carbonization when exposed to pyrrolidine at room temperature.

Attempts have been made to replace iodine side groups with other functional groups. There are also attempts being made at making other halogen analogs of PIDA.

== See also ==
- Crystal engineering
