= Dichloroacetylene =

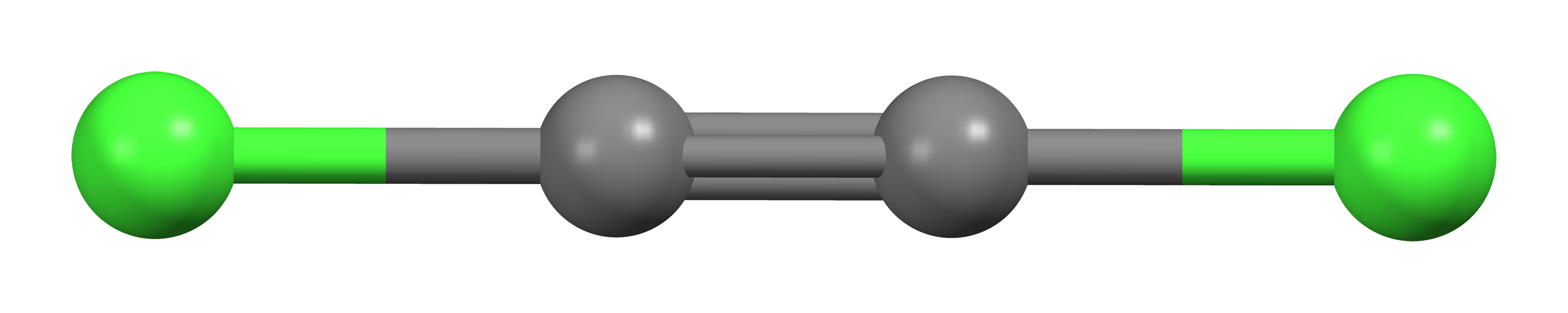

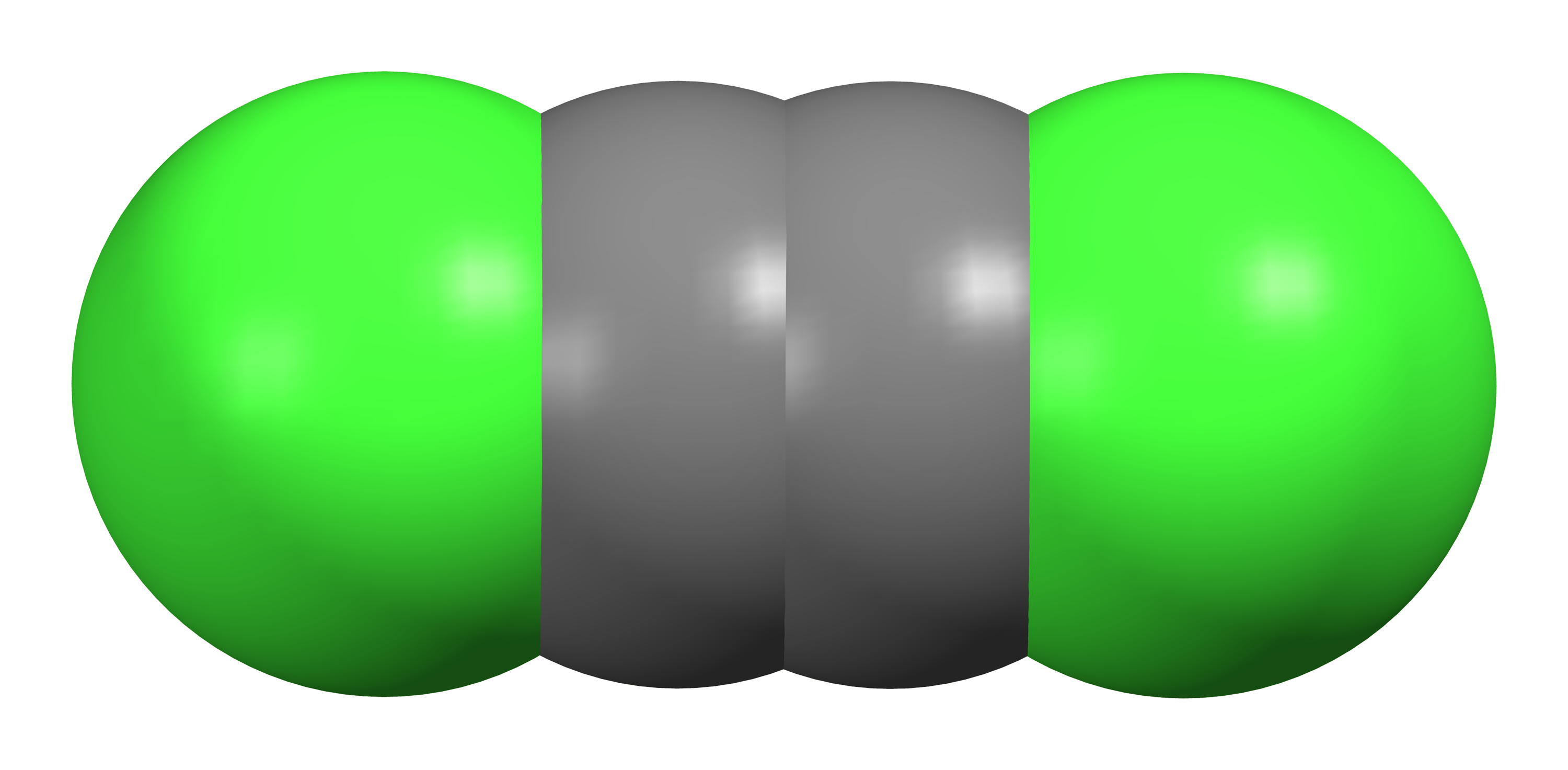

Names
- IUPAC name Dichloroethyne
- Other names DCA, dichloroethyne

Identifiers
CAS Number	7572-29-4
3D model (JSmol)	Interactive image
ChemSpider	22649
ECHA InfoCard	100.149.197
PubChem CID	24227
RTECS number	AP1080000
UNII	95I833JV4S
CompTox Dashboard (EPA)	DTXSID7020429
- InChI: InChI=1S/C2Cl2/c3-1-2-4 Key: ZMJOVJSTYLQINE-UHFFFAOYSA-N; InChI=1/C2Cl2/c3-1-2-4 Key: ZMJOVJSTYLQINE-UHFFFAOYAO
- SMILES: C(#CCl)Cl

Properties
Chemical formula	C_{2}Cl_{2}
Molar mass	94.92 g·mol^{−1}
Appearance	colorless oily liquid
Odor	disagreeable, sweetish
Density	1.26 g/cm^{3}
Melting point	−66 to −64 °C (−87 to −83 °F; 207 to 209 K)
Boiling point	33 °C (91 °F; 306 K) explodes
Solubility in water	insoluble
Solubility	soluble in acetone, ethanol, ether

Thermochemistry
Std molar entropy (S^{⦵}_{298})	272.0 ± 13 J·K^{−1}·mol^{−1} (gas)
Std enthalpy of formation (Δ_{f}H^{⦵}_{298})	209.6 ± 42 kJ·mol^{−1} (gas); 233.39 ± 0.95 kJ·mol^{−1} (gas)

Hazards
- Occupational safety and health (OHS/OSH)
Main hazards	explosive, potential carcinogen
- GHS labelling
Pictograms	(GHS01: Explosive) (GHS08: Health hazard) (GHS02: Flammable) (GHS06: Toxic)
Hazard statements	H200, H319, H330, H335, H351, H370, H372, H373
Precautionary statements	P260, P264, P270, P271, P280, P284, P304+P340, P310, P312, P320, P321, P337+P313, P403+P233, P405, P501
- NIOSH (US health exposure limits)
PEL (Permissible)	none
REL (Recommended)	Ca C 0.1 ppm (0.4 mg/m^{3})
IDLH (Immediate danger)	Ca (N.D.)

Related compounds
Other anions	Acetylene; Difluoroacetylene; Dibromoacetylene; Diiodoacetylene; Tetrachloroethylene; Tetrachloromethane; Hexachloroethane
- Except where otherwise noted, data are given for materials in their standard state (at 25 °C [77 °F], 100 kPa). Infobox references

Dichloroacetylene (DCA) is an organochlorine compound with the formula C_{2}Cl_{2}. It is a colorless, pyrophoric, explosive liquid that has a sweet and "disagreeable" odor. Dichloroacetylene is neurotoxic, hepatotoxic, nephrotoxic and possibly carcinogenic.

== History and production ==
Dichloroacetylene was first synthesized via the thermal decarboxylation of barium trichloroacrylate by Jacob Böeseken and J. F. Carriére in 1914:

Ba(Cl_{2}C=C(Cl)COO)_{2} → BaCl_{2} + ClC≡CCl + 2CO_{2}

Dichloroacetylene was discovered as an intermediate in the synthesis of diphenylacetylene with calcium carbide, chlorine and benzene in 1918. It was first synthesized from trichloroethylene by Erwin Ott, W. Ottemeyer and K. Packendorff in 1930.

Ether solutions of up to 50 mol% dichloroacetylene are relatively stable, and such solutions can be safely generated by the dehydrochlorination of trichloroethylene. A popular procedure uses potassium hydride as the base:

Cl_{2}C=CHCl + KH → ClC≡CCl + KCl + H_{2}

A trace of methanol is required.

It has also been generated (and used in situ) using lithium diisopropylamide under anhydrous conditions as well as potassium hydroxide.

=== Adventitious routes ===
It is a by-product in the production of vinylidene chloride. For instance, it can be formed from trichloroethylene. It is also possible to produce dichloroacetylene from trichloroethylene at low concentrations by running the trichloroethylene through nitrogen at 120 °C in the presence of dry potassium hydroxide.

== Stability ==
Pure dichloroacetylene is explosive, igniting or detonating spontaneously upon contact with air. Products of this reaction include phosgene, carbon monoxide, and carbon dioxide:

ClC≡CCl + O_{2} → Cl_{2}C=O + CO

When heated to 130 °C in the absence of air, it explosively decomposes to the elements:

ClC≡CCl → 2C + Cl_{2}

Dichloroacetylene has been reported to trimerize to hexachlorobenzene upon heating, as well as perhaps on exposure to light. While it does not undergo heat-induced polymerization, molybdenum pentachloride catalyzes its room-temperature polymerization to cis-polydichloroacetylene.

Like other haloalkynes, dichloroacetylene is a strong halogen bond donor. It forms an air-stable azeotrope with ether, boiling at 32 °C, that contains 55.4 wt% DCA, corresponding to a 1:1 molar ratio.

Stabilizers such as trichloroethylene can support dichloroacetylene concentrations of up to 200 parts per million in air without significant decomposition.

== Reactions ==
Dichloroacetylene, being electrophilic, adds nucleophiles, such as amines:

ClC≡CCl + R_{2}NH → Cl(H)C=CCl(NR_{2})

It forms pi-complexes with tungsten, such as [WCl_{5}(C_{2}Cl_{2})]^{−}.

== Biological role and toxicity ==
Dichloroacetylene causes severe neurological disorders, among other problems. Main route of human exposure to dichloroacetylene has been the breakdown of trichloroethylene in presence of alkali hydroxides, historically during trichloroethylene anaesthesia when soda lime was used. Humans exposed to dichloroacetylene showed symptoms such as nausea, vomiting, loss of appetite, headache, facial nervous and muscular issues, and formation of herpes-like lesions on the face. Some people reported itching around the eyes and pain around the jaw. It affects the trigeminal nerve in particular and over-exposure could be fatal.

Studies on male rats and rabbits have shown that inhalation of dichloroacetylene can cause tubular necrosis, focal necrosis, and other nephrotoxic effects. Additionally, the rabbits that were given dichloroacetylene experienced hepatotoxic and neuropathological effects. Inhalation of dichloroacetylene also causes benign tumors of the livers and kidneys of rats. The chemical also caused increased instances of lymphomas. It also causes weight loss in animals. 3.5% of a dose of dichloroacetylene remains in the corpses of male Wistar rats. The LC50s of mice exposed to dichloroacetylene are 124 parts per million for a 1-hour exposure by inhalation and 19 parts per million for a 6-hour exposure by inhalation. The chemical is ingested primarily through glutathione-dependent systems. Glutathione also reacts with it. Hepatic and renal glutathione S-transferases serve as catalysts to this reaction. While dichloroacetylene is nephrotoxic in rats, its nephrotoxicity in humans is not well-understood.

Dichloroacetylene has mutagenic effects on Salmonella typhimurium.

Like trichloroethylene, dichloroacetylene is metabolized to S-(1,2-dichlorovinyl)-L-cysteine (DCVC) in vivo.

The maximum safe concentration of dichloroacetylene in air is 0.1 parts per million. It is unsafe to store dichloroacetylene in close proximity to potassium, sodium, or aluminium powder. According to the Department of Transportation, it is forbidden to ship dichloroacetylene.

== Additional reading ==
- Trifu, Roxana Melita (1999), "Dichloroacetylene", Homopolymers of Dihaloacetylenes (Ph.D. Thesis), p. 57, Bibcode:1999PhDT.......149T, ISBN 978-0-549-39503-4

== See also ==
- Dibromoacetylene
- Difluoroacetylene
- Diiodoacetylene
- Organochloride
