= Diiodobutadiyne =

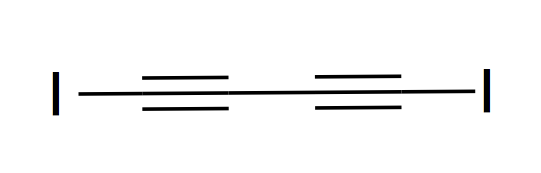

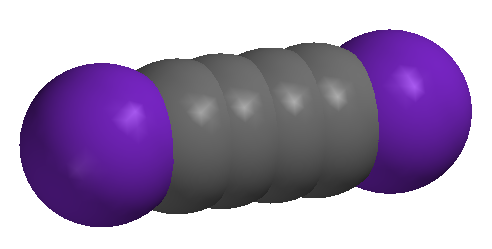

Names
- IUPAC name 1,4-Diiodobuta-1,3-diyne
- Other names Diiododiacetylene

Identifiers
CAS Number	53214-97-4
3D model (JSmol)	Interactive image
ChemSpider	126166
PubChem CID	143018
UNII	5X9Z3DTV8M
CompTox Dashboard (EPA)	DTXSID70201300
- InChI: InChI=1S/C4I2/c5-3-1-2-4-6 Key:HUKBPXSFAFKZBD-UHFFFAOYSA-N
- SMILES: IC#CC#CI

Properties
Chemical formula	C_{4}I_{2}
Molar mass	301.853 g·mol^{−1}
Appearance	White solid
Solubility in hexanes	Soluble

Structure
Molecular shape	Linear

Explosive data
Shock sensitivity	Sensitive - may explode if struck

Related compounds
Related compounds	Diiodoacetylene; Diacetylene; PIDA
- Except where otherwise noted, data are given for materials in their standard state (at 25 °C [77 °F], 100 kPa). Infobox references

Diiodobutadiyne (1,4-diiodobuta-1,3-diyne) is an organoiodine compound with the chemical formula C_{4}I_{2}. Its structure is I−C≡C−C≡C−I. It is a white solid. It is used in the creation of the polymer poly(diiododiacetylene) (PIDA) by undergoing 1,4 polymerization. It is a small linear molecule related to diacetylene, where the hydrogens of diacetylene is replaced by iodine.

Diiodobutadiyne is light sensitive and explosive if stored out of solution as a dry solid. It will undergo random 1,2 and 1,4 polymerization, as well as decomposition in solution if kept over an extended period of time, having a half-life of just about two weeks.
