= Dibromoiodoethylene =

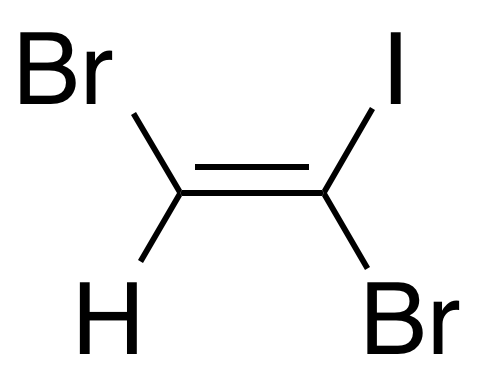
(Z)-1,2- isomer
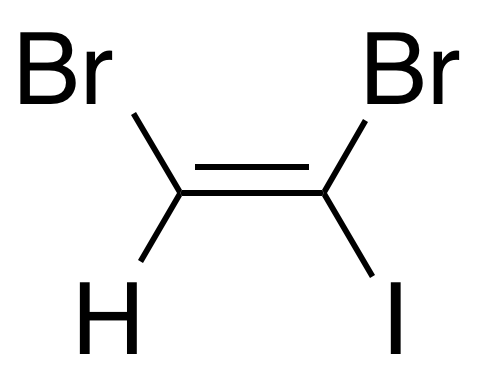
(E)-1,2- isomer
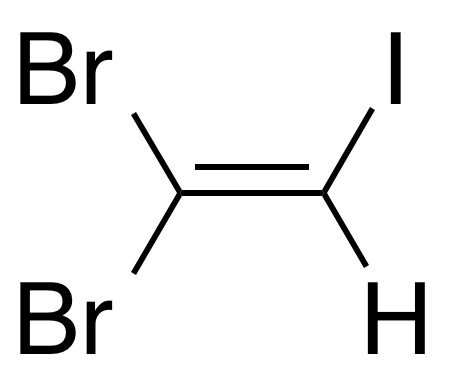
- 1,1- isomer

Identifiers
CAS Number	(Z)-1,2-: 572902-87-5; (E)-1,2-: 572902-82-0; 1,1-: 572902-88-6
3D model (JSmol)	(Z)-1,2-: Interactive image; (E)-1,2-: Interactive image; 1,1-: Interactive image
ChemSpider	1,2-: 129331411
PubChem CID	(Z)-1,2-: 21559773; (E)-1,2-: 102247496; 1,1-: 20473688
CompTox Dashboard (EPA)	(Z)-1,2-: DTXSID301337138; (E)-1,2-: DTXSID001337141; 1,1-: DTXSID701337142
- InChI: (Z)-1,2-: InChI=1S/C2HBr2I/c3-1-2(4)5/h1H/b2-1- Key: LKNUFXGEOPARSR-UPHRSURJSA-N; (E)-1,2-: InChI=1S/C2HBr2I/c3-1-2(4)5/h1H/b2-1+ Key: LKNUFXGEOPARSR-OWOJBTEDSA-N; 1,1-: InChI=1S/C2HBr2I/c3-2(4)1-5/h1H Key: XQBJKLVQMOQFEB-UHFFFAOYSA-N
- SMILES: (Z)-1,2-: C(=C(/Br)\I)\Br; (E)-1,2-: C(=C(\Br)/I)\Br; 1,1-: C(=C(Br)Br)I

Properties
Chemical formula	C_{2}HBr_{2}I
Molar mass	311.742 g·mol^{−1}
- Except where otherwise noted, data are given for materials in their standard state (at 25 °C [77 °F], 100 kPa). Infobox references

Dibromoiodoethylene is a dense organic liquid consisting of an ethylene core with two bromine atoms and one iodine atom as substituents. It is formed by the reaction of dibromoacetylene with hydrogen iodide.

There are three isomers of dibromoiodoethylene, varying in the position of the two bromine atoms compared to each other.
