= Polycatenane =

Mechanically interlocked molecular architecture

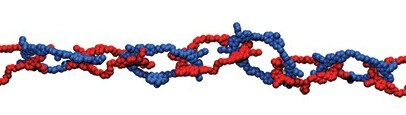
Polycatenane model.

A polycatenane is a chemical substance that, like polymers, is chemically constituted by a large number of units. These units are made up of concatenated rings into a chain-like structure.

It consists of mechanically linked catenane structures, via topological Hopf links, resulting in a higher dimensionality than the repeating unit. They are a class of catenanes where the number of macrocycles is greater than two and as catenanes they belong to the big family of mechanically interlocked molecular architectures (MIMAs).

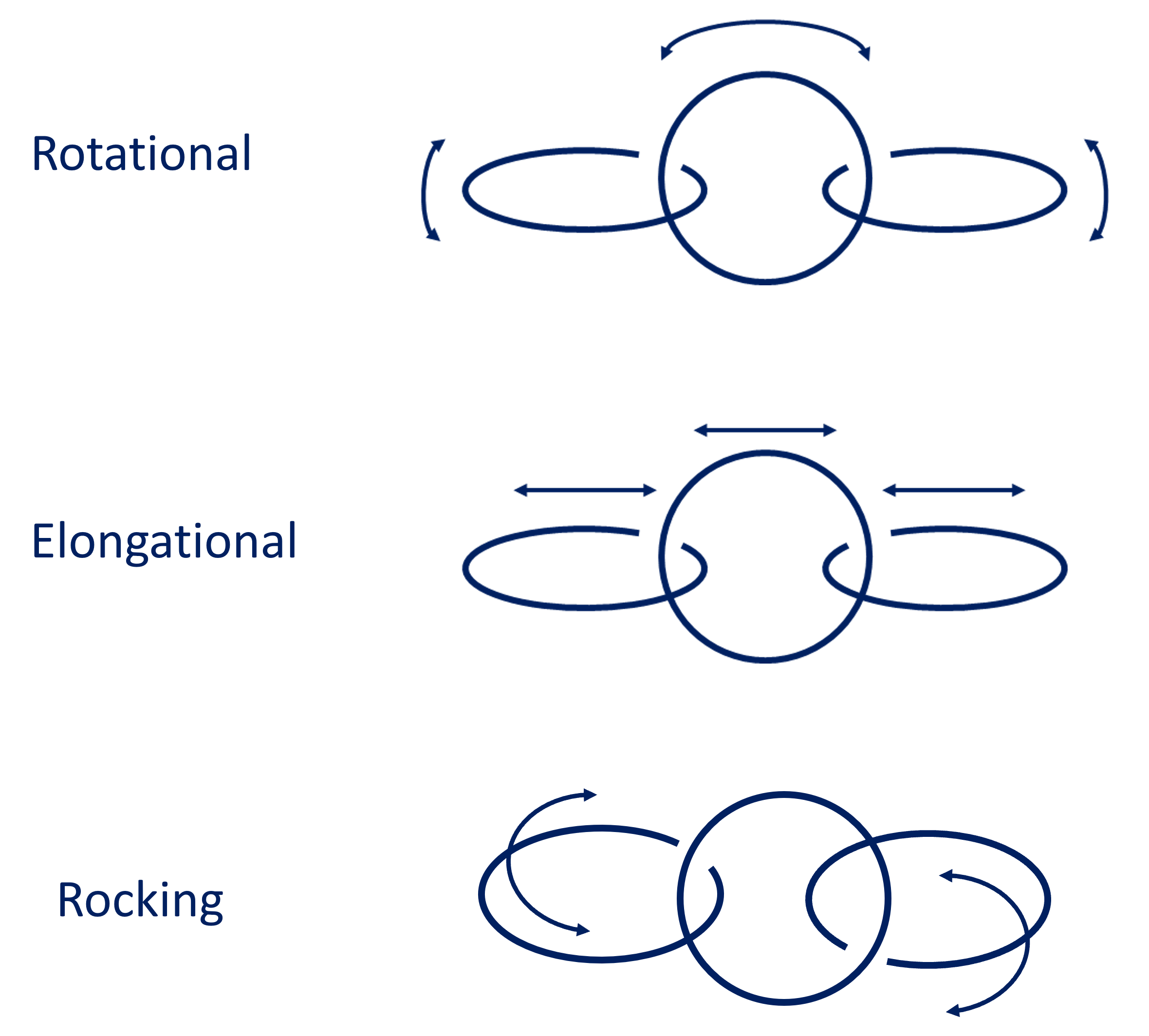
Reciprocal degree of motion of polycatenanes rings.

The characteristic feature of a polycatenane compound, that distinguishes it from other polymers, is the presence of mechanical bonds in addition to covalent bonds. The rings in this chain-like structure can be separated only when high energy is provided to break at least a covalent bond of the macrocycle. [n]-Catenanes (for large n), which consist solely of the mechanically interlocked cyclic components, can be viewed as "optimized" polycatenanes. The main difference between poly-[2]-catenanes and poly-[n]-catenanes is the repeating unit, as a monomer is for the polymer. In the first case the monomer is made of two interlocked rings that repeat continuously in the final polycatenane, while in the latter case there is only one ring that repeat the interlocking process for a large number of times. If the rings of the polycatenane are all of the same type, it can be defined as a homocatenane while if the subunits are different it is defined as heterocatenane.

As a chain, the degree of motion of these structures is very high, greater than the one of a usual polymer, because the rings possess a reciprocal rotational, elongational and rocking motion. This flexibility is retained even if the macrocycles themselves are very rigid units, because the mobility is given by the ability of the rings to move with respect to each other. This mobility influences the final properties of the material (mechanical, rheological and thermal), and provides a dynamic behavior.

== Classification ==
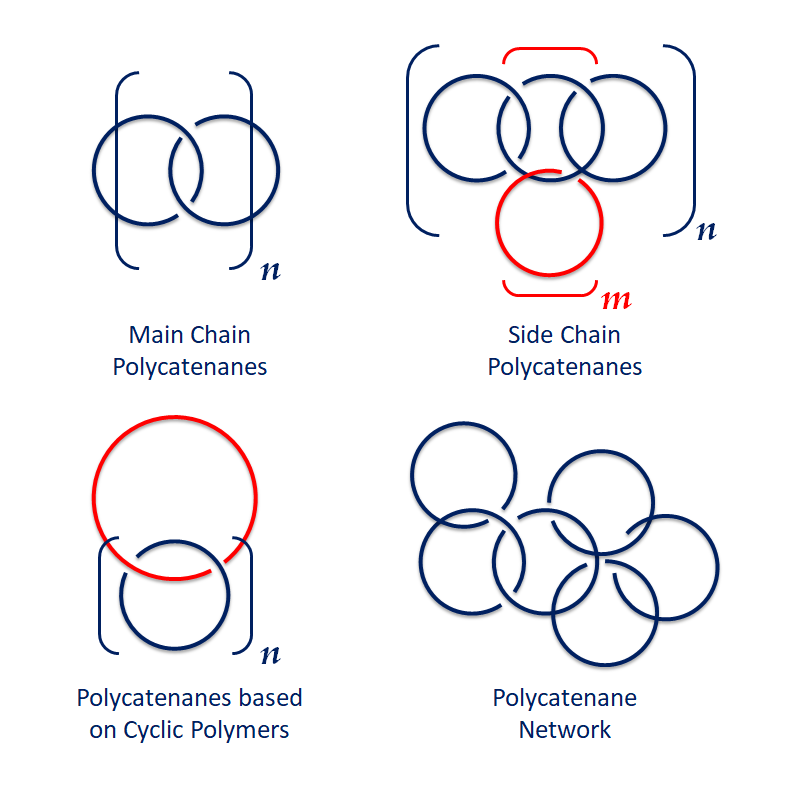
Four classes of polycatenanes

Depending on the location of the catenane structures in the polymer chain, the polycatenanes can be divided into main-chain polycatenanes and side-chain polycatenanes.

Main-chain polycatenanes are linear catenanes in which the rings are interlocked in a large number of units. They can also be a series of oligomers linked physically even if not interlocked together. The stability of the structure is not only given by mechanical bonds but also hydrogen bonds and π-π interactions between the rings.

On the other hand, the side-chain polycatenanes are polycatenanes with ramifications where more oligomers are connected on the same cycle with respect to the main backbone. This type of catenane is synthesised, functionalising the macrocycles so that there is directionality with the possibility to control the ramification.

There are other types of polycatenanes like the ones based on cyclic polymers, where the macrocyles are interlocked to the cyclic polymers, or the polycatenane networks, where catenanes are interlocked into a net.

=== Catenated nanocages ===
The basic unit of the polycatenane can differ from the relatively simple organic macrocycle. When organic and inorganic building blocks come together, they can form coordination cages (or macromolecular cages) that can interlock with one another to form a polycatenane structure. The mechanism is still unexplored but generally the subunits self-assemble into a 0D cage and, in a concerted process, interlock together as short catenane (i.e., [2]-catenane) or into a linear or more intricate catenane structure. Sometimes the catenated cages structure is more stable with respect to the monomeric cage state, and it can be formed passing through a favored reaction intermediate. The synthesis can follow a statistical or a directed routes, forming more or less product, but there are some cases when post-synthetic modifications can increase the product yields. Catenated cages can be applied in a wide range of application due to the high presence of voids.

== Synthesis and applications ==
=== Synthesis ===
The synthesis of polycatenanes is considered a challenging task with most of the reported examples being in the solution state and very few in the solid state. The formation of poly-[2]-catenanes can be achieved by polymerisation of functionalised [2]-catenanes. Also the synthesis of [3]-catenanes, [5]-catenanes, [6]-catenanes and [7]-catenanes is reported in many articles. The synthesis of poly-[n]-catenanes has instead some practical issues. To this purpose, molecular dynamic simulation is very used as a tool for the design of the optimal synthetic path toward the desired product by predicting the final topology.

There are two main synthetic routes: the statistical approach and the template-directed approach.

The statistical approach is based on a stochastic methodology. When the reactants are together, there is a probability that they will fit together first and then close on top of each other in a process of cyclisation. The catenation of two rings into a catenane is already complex, thus, as expected, the interlocking of multiple cycles into a polycatenane is statistically improbable. Being an unfavored entropically process the product is obtained in very small amounts. Also, the cyclisation process requires high dilutions, but the elongation of the chain is favored at high concentrations, making the synthesis even more difficult.

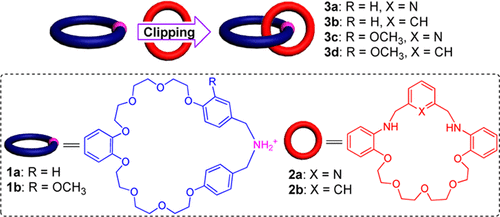
Example of template-directed clipping approach for the synthesis of catenanes.

The template-directed approach is based on the host-guest interactions that can direct the cyclisation of pre-organised linear unit upon the existing macrocycle. These interactions can be hydrogen bonds, π-π interactions, hydrophobic interactions or metal ions coordinations. In this way the synthesis can be enthalpy-driven, obtaining quantitative results.

The yield and selectivity are restrained by the kinetic or thermodynamic control of the reaction.

Generally the kinetic control induces the formation of a product after short reaction times because it is favoued by irreversible reactions (or equilibrium reaction moved very much toward the formation of the products). The thermodynamic product is obtained for longer reaction times for reversible processes. In this case the units have the time to rearrange themselves toward the most stable state, in a sort of error-checking process. This is obtained by breaking covalent and coordination bonds and forming the most stable ones.

=== Applications ===
Given that polycatenanes are a relatively recent field of study, the properties of these materials are not yet fully explored and understood. The type of bonds that characterize the whole structure (covalent, non-covalent or mechanical bonds), the degree of mobility of the chain, the interactions between different chains and the fraction of voids of the catenanes are all factors that contribute to the final properties. As they can be strictly related to the family of metal-organic frameworks, the catenanes share all the potential applications of this class of compounds. Among these, there are applications in biomedicine, catalysis, as conducting bridges or in electronic devices, sensing or in recent fields like molecular machines.

== See also ==
- Mechanically interlocked molecular architectures
- Catenane
- Polyrotaxane
- Macrocycle
- Coordination cage
- Macromolecular cages
- Macromolecule
- Metal-organic compound
- Metal–organic framework
