= Difluoroacetylene =

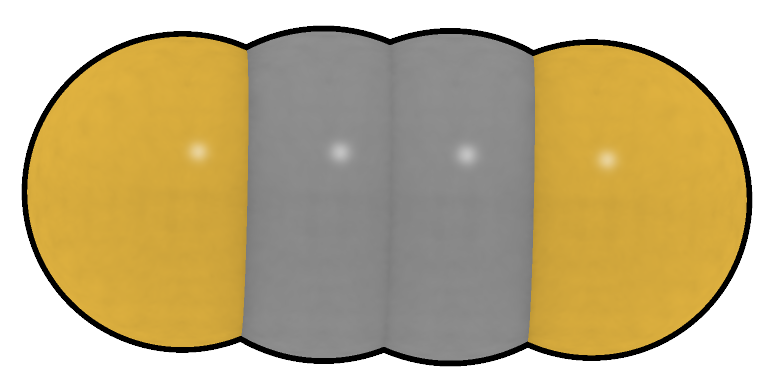

Names
- Preferred IUPAC name Difluoroethyne
- Other names Difluoroacetylene

Identifiers
CAS Number	689-99-6
3D model (JSmol)	Interactive image
ChemSpider	120260
PubChem CID	136491
CompTox Dashboard (EPA)	DTXSID70218978
- InChI: InChI=1S/C2F2/c3-1-2-4 Key: BWTZYYGAOGUPFQ-UHFFFAOYSA-N; InChI=1/C2F2/c3-1-2-4 Key: BWTZYYGAOGUPFQ-UHFFFAOYAS
- SMILES: FC#CF

Properties
Chemical formula	C_{2}F_{2}
Molar mass	62.019 g·mol^{−1}

Related compounds
Related compounds	Acetylene; Dichloroacetylene; Dibromoacetylene; Diiodoacetylene; Tetrafluoroethylene; Tetrafluoromethane; Hexafluoroethane
- Except where otherwise noted, data are given for materials in their standard state (at 25 °C [77 °F], 100 kPa). Infobox references

Difluoroacetylene is a compound of carbon and fluorine having molecular formula C_{2}F_{2}. A linear molecule, its two carbons are joined by a triple bond and have terminal fluorines: F−C≡C−F. The molecule is the perfluorocarbon analog of acetylene, C_{2}H_{2}. Preparation of difluoroacetylene is difficult, with danger of explosions and with low yields. Nevertheless, the compound has been made, isolated, and characterized by various spectroscopical methods (MS, NMR, Photoelectron- and IR spectroscopy). The compound is of interest as a precursor to fluoropolymers containing double bonds, analogous to polyacetylene.

Difluoroacetylene is stable in the gaseous phase under low pressure. At liquid nitrogen temperature, it is slowly changing to tetrafluorobutatriene, most likely through an intermediate of difluorovinylidene.

== See also ==
Higher halogen homologues:

- Dichloroacetylene
- Dibromoacetylene
- Diiodoacetylene

== Bibliography ==
- Trifu, Roxana Melita (1999). Homopolymers of dihaloacetylenes (Ph.D. thesis, University of Illinois at Chicago).
