= Dibromoacetylene =

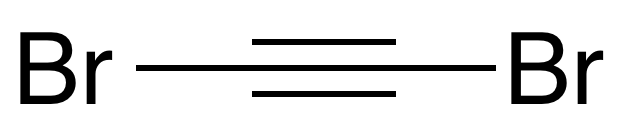

Names
- Preferred IUPAC name 1,2-Dibromoethyne

Identifiers
CAS Number	624-61-3
3D model (JSmol)	Interactive image
ChemSpider	55115
PubChem CID	61169
UNII	D6K2Q8U3HH
CompTox Dashboard (EPA)	DTXSID40211456
- InChI: InChI=1S/C2Br2/c3-1-2-4 Key: JNFBOWNNNAHVNZ-UHFFFAOYSA-N
- SMILES: C(#CBr)Br

Properties
Chemical formula	C_{2}Br_{2}
Molar mass	183.830 g·mol^{−1}
Appearance	Colorless liquid
Melting point	−16.5 °C (2.3 °F; 256.6 K)

Related compounds
Related compounds	Acetylene; Difluoroacetylene; Dichloroacetylene; Diiodoacetylene; Tetrabromoethylene; Tetrabromomethane; Hexabromoethane
- Except where otherwise noted, data are given for materials in their standard state (at 25 °C [77 °F], 100 kPa). Infobox references

Dibromoacetylene is an organic compound with the chemical formula C_{2}Br_{2}. It is a molecular chemical compound containing acetylene, with its hydrogen substituted by bromine. Its molecule is linear, with the structure Br−C≡C−Br.

== Production ==
Dibromoacetylene can be made by reacting 1,1,2-tribromoethylene with potassium hydroxide. This method has a danger of causing explosions.

Another way is to react acetylene with phenyl lithium (at −50 °C) to make lithium acetylide, which then reacts with bromine to yield the product.

Yet another way is to react acetylene with sodium hypobromite NaOBr.

== Properties ==
Dibromoacetylene is explosive and sensitive to air. Its appearance is a clear water like liquid. It has a sweetish smell, but makes a white fume in air that then smells like ozone, possibly because it forms ozone. Dibromoacetylene is lachrymatory.

Dibromoacetylene can be polymerised to polydibromoacetylene using catalysts like titanium tetrachloride and triethylaluminium. Polydibromoacetylene is black, electrically conducting, and stable in air to over 200 °C.

The infrared spectrum has absorption at 2185 cm^{−1} due to symmetrical stretching on the C≡C bond, 832 cm^{−1} asymmetrical stretch on C-Br bond, 311 cm^{−1} bending on Z shape BrCC, 267 symmetrical stretch on all bonds, and 167 cm^{−1} for C-shaped bending.

== Reactions ==
In air dibromoacetylene spontaneously inflames producing black sooty smoke and a red flame. When heated, it explodes, yielding carbon and other substances. A slower reaction with oxygen and water, yields oxalic acid and hydrobromic acid and other bromine containing substances. A reaction with hydrogen iodide yields dibromoiodoethylene. Dibromoacetylene reacts with bromine to yield tetrabromoethene.

Dibromoacetylene reacts with Apiezon L, which is used as a vacuum grease in distillation, so its use is unsuitable with this chemical.
