= Polydiacetylenes =

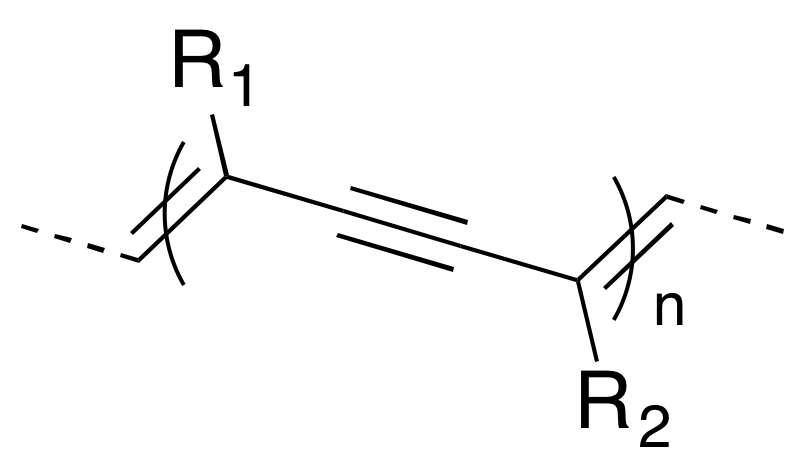
General chemical structure of a polydiacetylene

Polydiacetylenes (PDAs) are a family of conducting polymers closely related to polyacetylene. They are created by the 1,4 topochemical polymerization of diacetylenes. They have multiple applications from the development of organic films to immobilization of other molecules.

== History ==
The first polydiacetylene to be discovered was Poly(1,6-bishydroxy hexa-2,4-diacetylene) by Gerhard Wegner in 1969. This was achieved by exposing crystals of 1,6-bishydroxy hexa-2,4-diyne to UV light. Polymerization was assumed to occur because of the spatial arrangement of diynes in the crystal, but this was not confirmed until 1972 when Raymond H. Baughman coined the term "topochemical polymerization" to describe polymerization due to spatial arrangement and put forth the spatial requirements needed for a polymerization of this sort.

== Synthesis ==
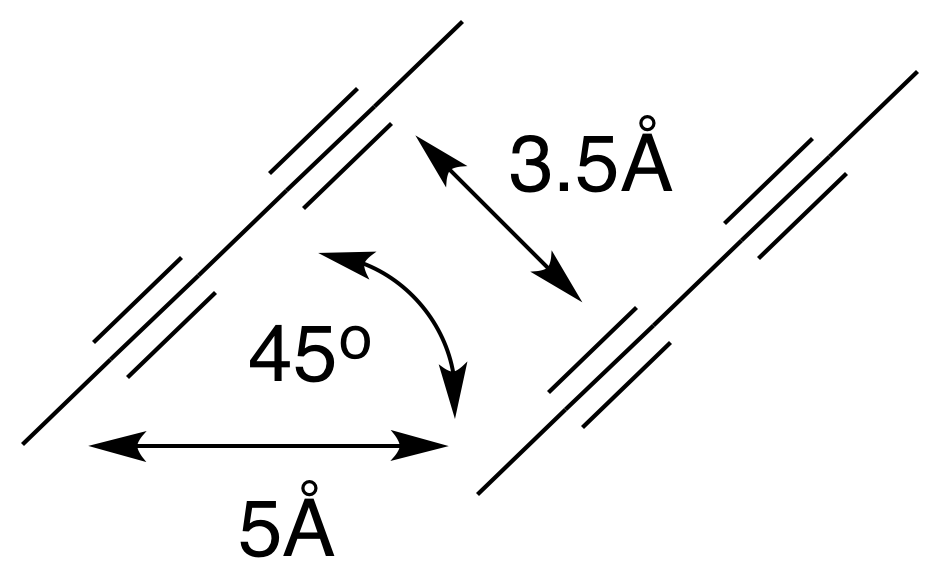
Ideal spatial parameters for topochemical polymerization

Synthesis of polydiacetylenes occurs through topochemical polymerization of 1,3-diynes. Typically, this must occur in the solid state, because many diynes undergo both 1,2 and 1,4 polymerization in solution – such is the case with diiodobutadiyne, and other diynes with electron withdrawing substituents. The ideal arrangement of diynes in the solid state is a repeat distance of 5Å, a 45° tilt angle, and a 3.5Å distance between C1 of one monomer and C4 of the adjacent diyne monomer.

Usually, polymerization is accompanied by a color change, due to the presence of an extended π-system. In addition, many PDAs exhibit thermochromism caused by twisting of the polymer backbone, changing the amount of conjugation in the system. Depending upon the structure of the monomer, the resulting PDA can have interesting properties such as formation of a vesicle or tube structure.

The chromatic transition from blue to red phase of PDA is caused by the electronic structure of PDAs' backbone which is featured by the alternative carbon double bond and carbon triple bond. Upon exposure to the external stimuli such as thermal, chemical and mechanical stimulus, the conjugation effect will endow the chromatic properties to this type material. As far as the pure or "intrinsic" PDAs are concerned, the blue to red phase transition is irreversible, however if the head groups of the PDAs' side chain are strengthened by other structure, for example chelation with metal oxide nanoparticles, it could provide resilience of the backbone to conduct the reversible color change. Several recent researches which assisted by DFT simulation have shown that the chromatic properties could be modified by adjusting the side chain structures of PDA. With the development thin film fabrication technology such as inkjet printing, PDAs could be coated on different substrate materials as multifunctional sensor, for example Kapton films, aluminum foil or even conventional paper.

Zhu et al. have recently published an article about the synthesis of polydiacetylene using copper catalyst. This is first report on synthesis of polydiacetylenes in the solution phase.
