= Polyrotaxane =

Polyrotaxane is a type of mechanically interlocked molecule consisting of strings and rings, in which multiple rings are threaded onto a molecular axle and prevented from dethreading by two bulky end groups. As oligomeric or polymeric species of rotaxanes, polyrotaxanes are also capable of converting energy input to molecular movements because the ring motions can be controlled by external stimulus. Polyrotaxanes have attracted much attention for decades, because they can help build functional molecular machines with complicated molecular structure.

Although there are no covalent bonds between the axes and rings, polyrotaxanes are stable due to the high free activation energy (Gibbs energy) needed to be overcome to withdraw rings from the axes. Also, rings are capable of shuttling along and rotating around the axes freely, which leads to a huge amount of internal degree of freedom of polyrotaxanes. Due to this topologically interlocked structure, polyrotaxanes have many different mechanical, electrical, and optical properties compared to conventional polymers.

Additionally the mechanically interlocked structures can be maintained in slide-ring materials, which are a type supramolecular network synthesized by crosslinking the rings (called figure-of-eight crosslinking) in different polyrotaxanes. In slide-ring materials, crosslinks of rings can pass along the axes freely to equalize the tension of the threading polymer networks, which is similar to pulleys. With this specific structure, slide-ring materials can be fabricated highly stretchable engineering materials due to their different mechanical properties.

If the rings and axes are biodegradable and biocompatible, the polyrotaxanes can also be used for biomedical application, such as gene/drug delivery. The advantage of polyrotaxanes over other biomedical polymers, such as polysaccharides, is that because the interlocked structures are maintained by bulky stoppers at the ends of the strings, if the bulky stoppers are removed, such as removed by a chemical stimulus, rings dethread from the axes. The drastic structural change can be used for programmed drug or gene delivery, in which the drug or gene can be released with the rings when the stoppers are cut off at the specific destination.

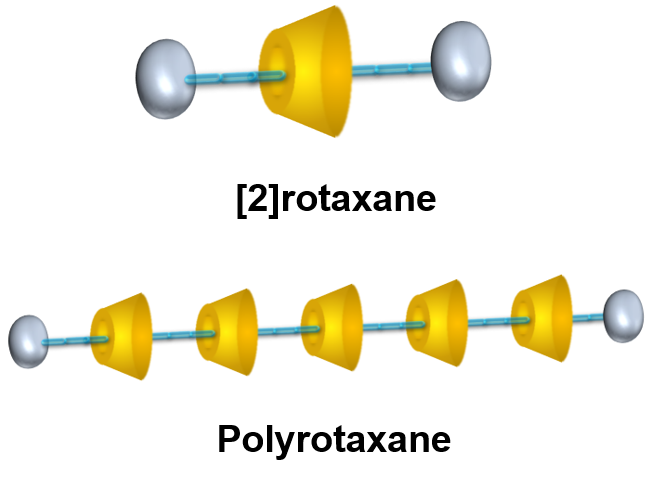
Rotaxane and Polyrotaxane

== Types of polyrotaxanes ==
According to the location of the rotaxanes units, polyrotaxanes can be mainly divided into two types: main chain polyrotaxanes, in which the rotaxane units locate on the main chain (axis), and side chain polyrotaxanes, in which the rotaxane units are located on the side chain. Corresponding polypseudorotaxanes can also be divided based on the same principle: main chain polypseudorotaxnes or side chain polypseudorotaxanes, in which there is no stopper at the ends.

In both main chain polyrotaxanes or side chain polyrotaxanes, the unique feature from other polymers is the potential for different motion of the ring unit relative to the string units. Because the shape and location of the assembly are capable of showing different responses to changes in temperature, pH or other environment conditions, polyrotaxanes have many distinctive properties.

=== Main chain polyrotaxanes ===
Main chain polyrotaxanes are formed by host–guest interactions of polymer backbones (main chain) with cyclic molecules that are interlocked by bulky stoppers.

There are five major synthesis routes for main chain polyrotaxanes.

(1) Cyclization in the presence of main chain.

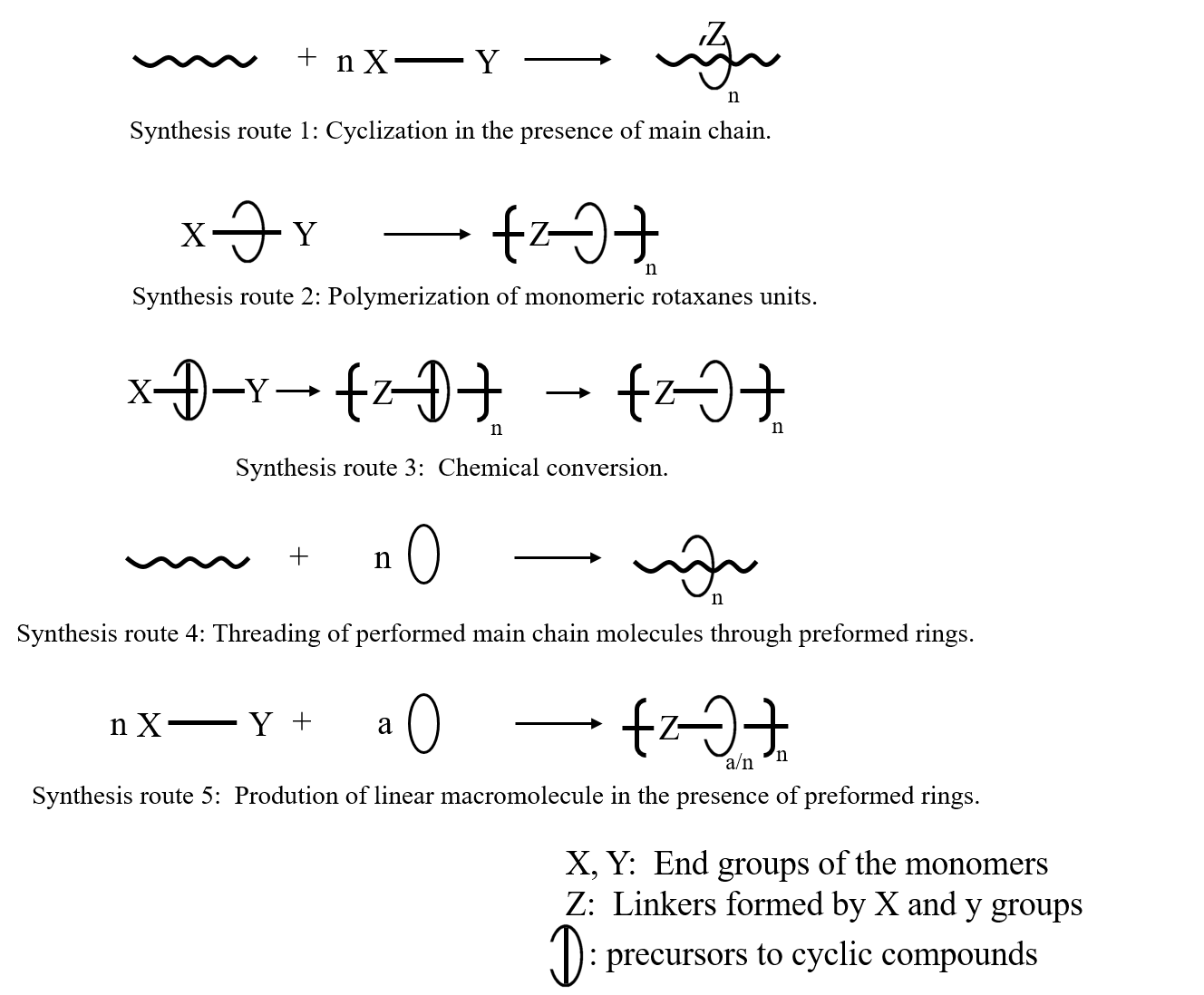
Synthesis routes to main chain polyrotaxanes

This synthesis route requires high dilution conditions of cyclization reactions. However, to most cases, it is difficult to sustain the high dilution conditions for rotaxane formation. Other possible methods to solve this problem are template cyclizations, such as cyclization based on metal chelation, change-transfer complexation or inclusion complexes.

(2) Polymerization of monomeric rotaxanes units.

Through polymerizing stable rotaxane monomers, polyrotaxanes are obtained. This method requires that the monomeric rotaxane units are stable in the solvent and have active groups that can be polymerized, which means the rings will not dethread from the main chain.

(3) Chemical conversion.

Specially designed linear polymers are required in this method. Designed monomers are polymerized to obtain special linear polymers with precursors of cyclic compounds. After bulky stoppers are modified onto two sides of polymer chains, the "temporary" chemical bonds in the precursors are cleaved to generate cyclic structure on the main chain, which becomes a polyrotaxane. The disadvantage of this method is the complex chemistry needed in the process of design and synthesis of the special linear polymers with precursors and the transitions to polyrotaxanes, e.g. the selective chemical bond cleavage. Many synthesis steps are required in this method.

(4) Threading of preformed main chain molecules through preformed rings.

The fourth approach is the simplest method to synthesize polyrotaxanes. Through mixing the main chain polymers and the rings in the solution, polyrotaxanes can be obtained after adding bulky stoppers to prevent the rings from dethreading from the chains. The number of rings on each chain depends on the threading equilibrium. Kinetic limitations due to the low concentration of chain ends and entropic effects also need further consideration. To overcome these obstacles, template threading (see below) is also a feasible alternative that can improve dynamically the number of threading rings by changing the equilibrium constant.

(5) Production of linear macromolecule in the presence of preformed rings.

Two general methods are included in this approach: the "statistical approach" and "template threading approach".

In the "statistical approach", the interaction between rings and strings is weakly attractive or repulsive or even negligible. Through employing an excess of rings, the equilibrium for threading or dethreading is forced to the threading side before polymerization. Compared with synthesis route 1, rings are a major constituent of the system instead of the rotaxanes, so the high dilution conditions are not required for this methods.

In "template threading approach", unlike the statistical approach, the interactions between rings and strings need to be attractive, such as metal chelations or charge transfer interactions which have been mentioned in the synthesis route 1. Because of this, the equilibrium is enthalpically driven, where the enthalpy is negative. In this method, high numbers of threading rings can be achieved, thus it is a useful way to stoichiometrically control the rings ratio of polyrotaxanes.

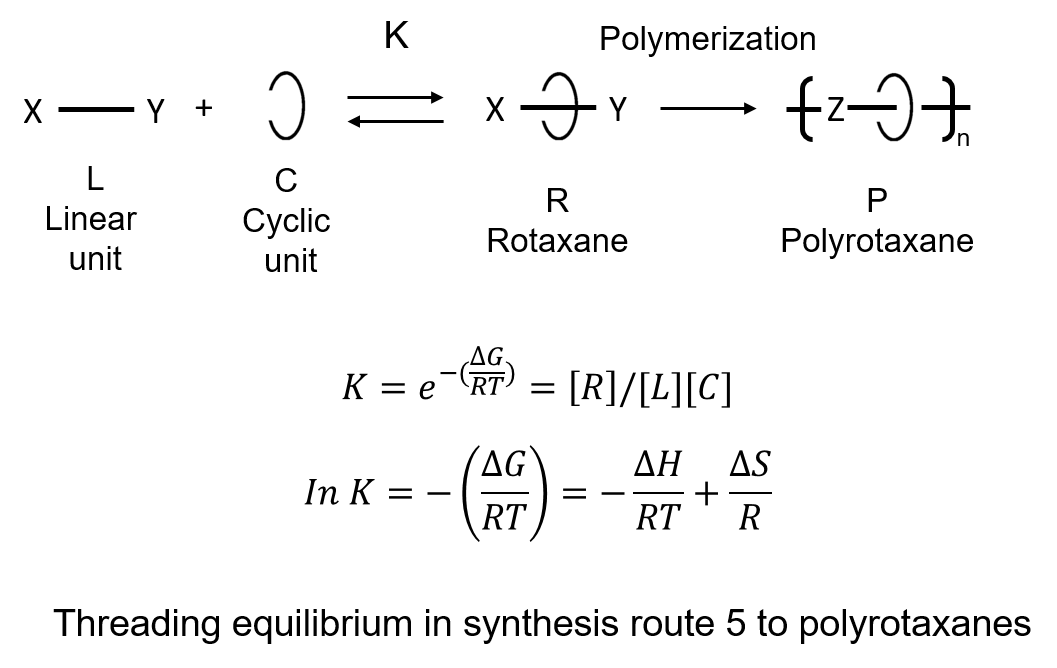

An example of the "statistical approach" is that a polyrotaxane was synthesized through polymerizing the rotaxane monomer that was assembled by oligomeric ethylene glycols (string) and crown ethers (ring) and naphthalene-1,5-di-isocyanate (stopper), which involves the threading equilibrium in the chain-ring system.

Cyclodextrins have been extensively studied as host molecules (ring) in polyrotaxanes. The poly(ethylene glycol)s can assemble with α-cyclodextrins to form a molecular necklace. Every two ethyleneoxy repeat units in poly(ethylene glycol)s can thread in one α-cyclodextrin. The models confirm that the distance of form zig-zag structure of repeat units corresponds to the size of cavity in α-cyclodextrins. This is a classical example of "template threadings" which also explains why poly(ethylene glycol)s are not able to form rotaxanes with β-cyclodextrin.

Crown ethers are another type of monomacrocyclic polymers that are used in synthesis of polyrotaxanes. The polyrotaxanes can be prepared by carrying out step-growth polymerizations in the presence of aliphatic crown ethers. In most of the cases, hydrogen bonding between the crown ethers and OH or NH/NHCO moieties are involved in the form of the assemblies. The threading efficiency will increase with the growth of sizes of the crown molecules. Additionally, stoppers will also greatly increase the threading efficiency.

Metal coordination also can be used to construct polyrotaxane structures. In this method, metal ions are employed as the synthesis templates to determine the coordinating sites of rotaxane structures. Conjugated polyrotaxanes can be synthesized through metal-template strategies followed by electropolymerization that ensures tuning of the electronic coupling between the ring cites and the conjugated backbone (string).

=== Side chain polyrotaxanes ===
Side chain polyrotaxanes are formed by host–guest interactions of polymer side chains with cyclic molecules that are interlocked by bulky stoppers.

There are mainly three types of side chain polyrotaxanes:

(1) Polyaxis/rotor: Comb-like polymers assembled with the cyclic molecules that are not interlocked on the side chain.

(2) Polyrotor/axis: polymers possess cyclic molecules on the side chain, which assemble with guest molecules to form polypseudorotaxanes.

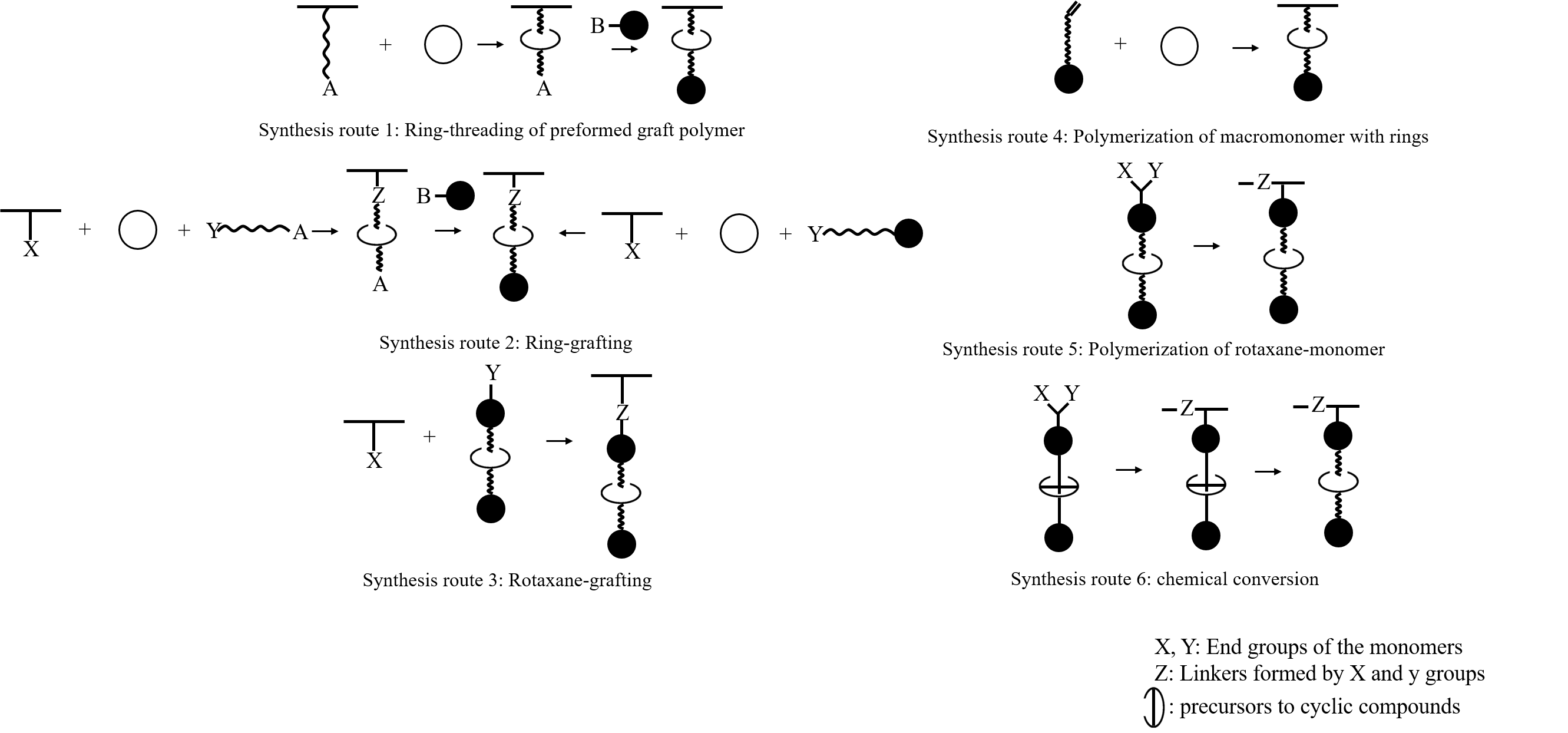
Synthesis routes to side chain polyrotaxanes

(3) Polyrotor/polyaxis: polymers possess covalently bonded cyclic molecule-moieties assembled with polymers possess guested in the side chain.

Similar to the synthesis routes to main chain polyrotaxanes, there are mainly six approaches to side chain polyrotaxane.

(1) Ring-threading of performed graft polymer

(2) Ring-grafting

(3) Rotaxane-grafting

(4) Polymerization of macromonomer with rings

(5) Polymerization of rotaxane-monomer

(6) Chemical conversion

Similarly, the positions of chain and rings can be switched, which results in corresponding side-chain polyrotaxanes.

== Properties ==
In a polyrotaxane, unlike a conventional polymer, the molecules are linked by mechanical bonding, such as hydrogen boding or charge transfer, not covalent bonds. Also, the rings are capable of rotating on or shuttling around the axles, resulting in the large amount of freedom of polyrotaxanes. This unconventional combination of molecules leads to the distinctive properties of polyrotaxanes.

=== Stability and solubility ===
Due to the existence of stoppers on the ends of the rotaxanes units, polyrotaxanes are more thermodynamically stable than polypseudorotaxanes (similar structure to polyrotaxane but without stoppers at two ends). Also, if the interactions between guest and host molecules are attractive, such as hydrogen bonding or charge transfer, they have better stabilities than those without attractive interactions. However, specific salts, changes of pH condition or temperature that can disturb or interrupt the interactions between ring-ring, ring-backbone, or backbone-backbone will destroy the structural integrity of polyrotaxanes. For example, dimethylformamide or dimethyl sulfoxide is able to interrupt the hydrogen bonding between cyclodextrins in the cyclodextrin-based polyrotaxanes. Also, change of pH or high temperature can also destroy the crystalline domains. Some chemical bonds between stoppers and chains are not stable in acidic or basic solution. As the stoppers cut from the chain, the rings will dethread from the axles, which leads to the dissociation of the polyrotaxanes.

For example, a "molecular necklace" assembled by α-cyclodextrins and polyethylene glycol is insoluble in water and dimethylfomamide, although their parents' components α-cyclodextrin and polyethylene glycol can be dissolved and this synthesis can happen in water. The product is soluble in dimethyl sulfoxide or 0.1 M sodium hydroxide solution. This is because the hydrogen bonding between the cyclodextrins. As the hydrogen bonding is destroyed by dimethyl sulfoxide or base solution, it can be dissolved, but the water does not deform the hydrogen interaction between cyclodextrins. In addition, the complexation process is exothermic in thermodynamic tests, which is also corresponding with the existence of hydrogen bonding.

=== Photoelectronic properties ===
One of the properties of polytorotaxanes involves the photoelectronic response when introducing photoactive or electrionic-active units into the mechanically interlocked structures.

For examples, the polyrotaxane structures are capable of enhancing the fluorescence quenching molecules that grafting on the rings and the other molecules at the ends. Amplification of a fluorescence chemosensory can be achieved by using polyrotaxane structure, which enhances the energy migration in the polymer. It was found that a rapid migration of the hole-electron pair to the rotaxanes sites is followed by a rapid combination which leads to the enhancement of the energy migration. In addition, the conductivity of these polyrotaxanes was lower than the parent components.

Also conductive polyrotaxanes can be obtained by employing metal binding in the polyrotaxanes structure. For example, a polyrotaxane containing a conjugated backbone can be synthesized through metal template and electropolymerization. The metal ion binding is reversible when another metal with stronger binding ability is employed to remove the previous ion, which results in the "scaffolding effect reversibility". The free coordination sites and the organic matrix are able to be maintained by the labile scaffolding.

== Potential application ==
=== Molecular machines ===
Many mechanically interlocked molecules have been studied to construct molecular machines. Because the molecules are linked by mechanical bonds instead of conventional covalent bonds, a component can move (shuttle) or rotate around the other parent component, which results in the large amount of freedom of mechanically interlocked molecules. Polyrotaxanes, as the polymer form of corresponding rotaxanes, are also applied in molecular machines.

For example, the shuttling behavior of the molecular shuttle can be controlled by the solvent or temperature. Due to the hydrophobic interaction between rings and strings, and the repulsive interaction between rings and linkers, conditions that are capable of influencing these interactions can be used to control the mobility of the rings in the molecular shuttle. In addition, if cationic or anionic units are employed to form the polyrotaxanes, the salts or pH in the solution also will influence the charge interactions between rings and strings, which is an alternative method to control the ring motion of the molecular shuttle.

Poly[2]rotaxane "daisy chains" (like a string of daisies with stems linked to form a chain)is an example of a molecule that can be used to form a molecular muscle. Poly[2]rotaxane can expand or shrink in response to external stimulus, which is similar to behaviors of muscle, an ideal model to construct a "molecular muscle". The ring stations on the chain can be controlled by pH or light. Due to "daisy chain" structure, two rings on the daisy chain will shift from one station to another station, which changes the distance between two rings as well as the state of the whole daisy chain. When the rings come close, the whole size of the daisy chain will increase, which is the "expand" state. As the rings get to the further station, the molecule become the "shrink" state as the decreased size.

=== Slide-ring materials ===
Extremely-stretchable-thermosensitive-hydrogels-by-introducing-slide-ring-polyrotaxane-cross-ncomms6124-s3

By chemically crosslinking the rings contained in the polyrotaxanes, sliding gels are obtained by being topologically interlocked by figure-of-eight crosslinks. Although it is a polymer network (gel), the rings are not fixed on the polyrotaxanes in the polymer network, the crosslinks of rings are able to freely move along the polymer chain. This can equalize the tension of the network, just like a pulley manner, which is referred to pulley effect. In chemical gels, the polymer chains are easy to be broken because the lengths of the heterogeneous polymer are limited or fixed. As a result, when the chemical gel is under a high pressure, the tension can not be equalized to the whole. On the opposite, the weakest part in the network will be broken easier, which leads to the damage of the gel. However, in the slide-ring materials, the polymer chain are able to pass through the figure-of-eight crosslinks which is like pulleys, and equalize the tension of network. As a result, slide-ring materials are applied to construct highly stretchable materials, up to 24 times its length when stretching and this process can be reversible.

=== Drug/gene delivery ===
Although polyrotaxanes are formed from components, their solubilities are different from the host or guest molecules. For examples, in the cyclodextrin-based polyrotaxanes, due to the hydrophilicity or high polarity of exterior structure of the cyclodextrins, some polyrotaxanes are able to be dissolved in water or other polar solvents though the guest molecules are hydrophobic or nonpolar. These water-soluble can be applied into drug or gene carriers.

There are two main advantages for polyrotaxanes applied to drug/gene delivery:

==== Targeting ====
Because the mechanically interlocked structures are maintained by bulky stoppers at the ends of the strings, if the bulky stoppers are removed, such as removed by a chemical stimulus, rings dethread from the axes. The drastic structural change can be used for programmed drug or gene delivery, of which drug or gene can be released with the rings when the stoppers are cut off at the specific destination.

For example, an enhanced gene delivery vehicle can be obtained by using a polyrotaxane formed by rings, backbones, then stoppers that linked by a disulfide bond (or other chemical bond that can be selected cleave in the body). The cation-functionalized polyrotaxanes can bind with pDNA to form complex through the electronstatic interaction. Glutathione (or other corresponding chemicals that can cleave the sensitive chemical bond) is over-expressed in the target cells. When the polyrotaxane/plasmid DNA (pDNA) complexes are uptaken by the target cells, intercellular glutathione could cleave the disulfide bond to cut off the stoppers at the end of polyrotaxanes, which results in the dissociation of the polyrotaxanes. As the rings dethread from the chain, pDNA is released with the ring molecules.

==== Long-term controlled release ====
Another advantage of poly(pseudo)rotaxanes is the ability for long-term release of drugs or genes. Some polyrotaxanes can used to form a physical hydrogel, which is called supramolecular hydrogel. In these cases, a three-dimensional physically crosslinked network formed by the poly(pseudo)rotaxanes, can be obtained, which is able to retain a large amount of water inside this network. If water-soluble drugs or genes are added in the solution, it could be capsulated in the supramolecular hydrogels. Also, functional units can be employed in the units of the poly(pseudo)rotaxanes, which enhances the interaction between the poly(pseudo)rotaxanes and capsulated drugs/genes and provides the carriers with other predetermined functions. As the network is further swollen in the water-based environment, part of the carrier will be dissolved gradually, so the capsulated drug or gene can be released from the hydrogels over a long period of time.

== See also ==
- Mechanically interlocked molecular architectures
- Polycatenane
