= Halogen bond =

Net attractive interaction involving one of the halogen elements

In chemistry, a halogen bond (XB or HaB) occurs when there is evidence of a net attractive interaction between an electrophilic region associated with a halogen atom in a molecular entity and a nucleophilic region in another, or the same, molecular entity. Like a hydrogen bond, the result is not a formal chemical bond, but rather a strong electrostatic attraction. Mathematically, the interaction can be decomposed in two terms: one describing an electrostatic, orbital-mixing charge-transfer and another describing electron-cloud dispersion. Halogen bonds find application in supramolecular chemistry; drug design and biochemistry; crystal engineering and liquid crystals; and organic catalysis.

== Definition ==
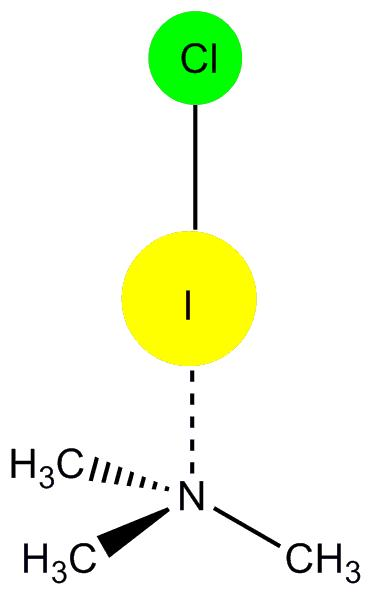
Halogen bond in complex between iodine monochloride and trimethylamine.

Halogen bonds occur when a halogen atom is electrostatically attracted to a partial negative charge. Necessarily, the atom must be covalently bonded in an antipodal σ-bond; the electron concentration associated with that bond leaves a positively charged "hole" on the other side. Although all halogens can theoretically participate in halogen bonds, the σ-hole shrinks if the electron cloud in question polarizes poorly or the halogen is so electronegative as to polarize the associated σ-bond. Consequently halogen-bond propensity follows the trend (Note: Although hydrogen is sometimes considered a halogen, convention excludes hydrogen bonds from the category of halogen bonds. For a complete analysis, see § Comparison to other bond-like forces.) F < Cl < Br < I.

There is no clear distinction between halogen bonds and expanded octet partial bonds; what is superficially a halogen bond may well turn out to be a full bond in an unexpectedly relevant resonance structure.

== Donor characteristics ==
A halogen bond is almost collinear with the halogen atom's other, conventional bond, but the geometry of the electron-charge donor may be much more complex.

- Multi-electron donors such as ethers and amines prefer halogen bonds collinear with the lone pair and donor nucleus.
- Pyridine derivatives tend to donate halogen bonds approximately coplanar with the ring, and the two C–N–X angles are about 120°.
- Carbonyl, thiocarbonyl-, and selenocarbonyl groups, with a trigonal planar geometry around the Lewis donor atom, can accept one or two halogen bonds.

Anions are usually better halogen-bond acceptors than neutral species: the more dissociated an ion pair is, the stronger the halogen bond formed with the anion.

== Comparison to other bond-like forces ==
A parallel relationship can easily be drawn between halogen bonding and hydrogen bonding. Both interactions revolve around an electron donor/electron acceptor relationship, between a halogen-like atom and an electron-dense one. But halogen bonding is both much stronger and more sensitive to direction than hydrogen bonding. A typical hydrogen bond has energy of formation 20 kJ/mol; known halogen bond energies range from 10–200 kJ/mol.

The σ-hole concept readily extends to pnictogen, chalcogen and aerogen bonds, corresponding to atoms of Groups 15, 16 and 18 (respectively).

== History ==
Chains in the 1:1 adduct of 1,4-dioxane and bromine, the first crystallographic evidence of halogen bonding.

In 1814, Jean-Jacques Colin discovered (to his surprise) that a mixture of dry gaseous ammonia and iodine formed a shiny, metallic-appearing liquid. Frederick Guthrie established the precise composition of the resulting I_{2}···NH_{3} complex fifty years later, but the physical processes underlying the molecular interaction remained mysterious until the development of Robert S. Mulliken's theory of inner-sphere and outer-sphere interactions. In Mulliken's categorization, the intermolecular interactions associated with small partial charges affect only the "inner sphere" of an atom's electron distribution; the electron redistribution associated with Lewis adducts affects the "outer sphere" instead.

Then, in 1954, Odd Hassel fruitfully applied the distinction to rationalize the X-ray diffraction patterns associated with a mixture of 1,4-dioxane and bromine. The patterns suggested that only 2.71 Å separated the dioxane oxygen atoms and bromine atoms, much closer than the sum (3.35 Å) of the atoms' van der Waals radii; and that the angle between the O−Br and Br−Br bond was about 180°. From these facts, Hassel concluded that halogen atoms are directly linked to electron pair donors in a direction with a bond direction that coincides with the axes of the orbitals of the lone pairs in the electron pair donor molecule. For this work, Hassel was awarded the 1969 Nobel Prize in Chemistry.

Dumas and coworkers first coined the term "halogen bond" in 1978, during their investigations into complexes of CCl_{4}, CBr_{4}, SiCl_{4}, and SiBr_{4} with tetrahydrofuran, tetrahydropyran, pyridine, anisole, and di-n-butyl ether in organic solvents.

However, it was not until the mid-1990s, that the nature and applications of the halogen bond began to be intensively studied. Through systematic and extensive microwave spectroscopy of gas-phase halogen bond adducts, Legon and coworkers drew attention to the similarities between halogen-bonding and better-known hydrogen-bonding interactions.

In 2007, computational calculations by Politzer and Murray showed that an anisotropic electron density distribution around the halogen nucleus — the "σ-hole" — underlay the high directionality of the halogen bond. This hole was then experimentally observed using Kelvin probe force microscopy.

In 2020, Kellett et al. showed that halogen bonds also have a π-covalent character similar to metal coordination bonds. In August 2023 the "π-hole" was too experimentally observed

== Applications ==
=== Crystal engineering ===
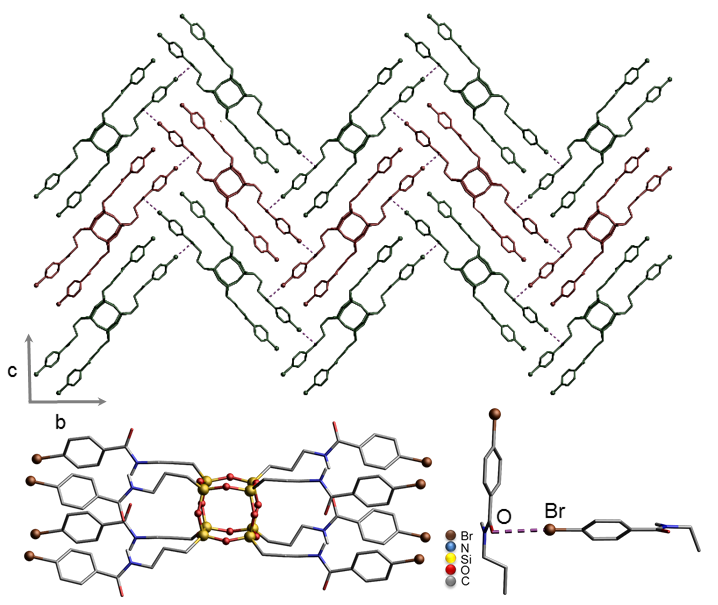
Br···O halogen bonds observed in the 3D crystal structure of certain silsesquioxanes.

The strength and directionality of halogen bonds are a key tool in the discipline of crystal engineering, which attempts to shape crystal structures through close control of intermolecular interactions. Halogen bonds can stabilize copolymers or induce mesomorphism in otherwise isotropic liquids. Indeed, halogen bond-induced liquid crystalline phases are known in both alkoxystilbazoles and silsesquioxanes (pictured). Alternatively, the steric sensitivity of halogen bonds can cause bulky molecules to crystallize into porous structures; in one notable case, halogen bonds between iodine and aromatic π-orbitals caused molecules to crystallize into a pattern that was nearly 40% void.

=== Controlled polymerization ===
Conjugated polymers offer the tantalizing possibility of organic molecules with a manipulable electronic band structure, but current methods for production have an uncontrolled topology. Sun, Lauher, and Goroff discovered that certain amides ensure a linear polymerization of poly(diiododiacetylene). The underlying mechanism is a self-organization of the amides via hydrogen bonds that then transfers to the diiododiacetylene monomers via halogen bonds. Although pure diiododiacetylene crystals do not polymerize spontaneously, the halogen-bond induced organization is sufficiently strong that the cocrystals do spontaneously polymerize.

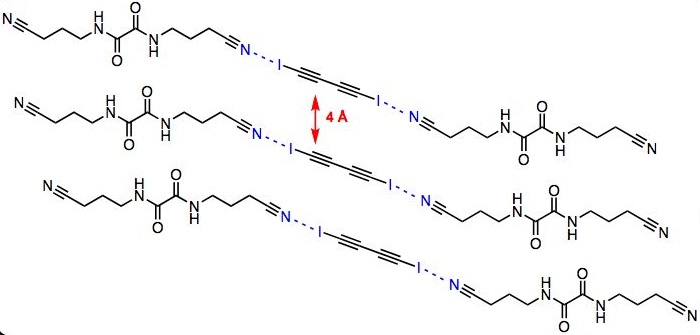
The catalyst-monomer cocrystal. Units repeat every 5.25 Å and are oriented at 51.3˚.

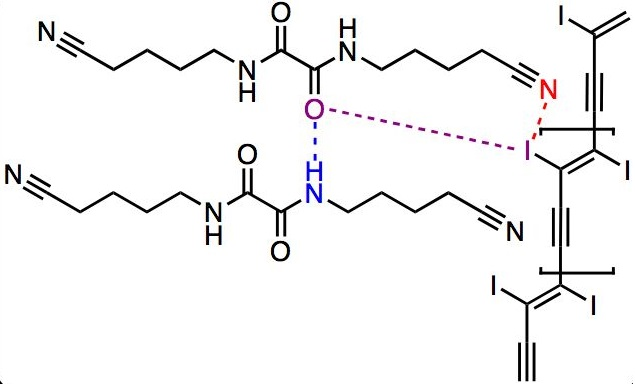
Post-polymerization crystal structure: the oxygen atom (purple) forms a hydrogen bond (blue dashed line) and a weak halogen bond with the polymer's iodine substituents. Iodine may also form a halogen bond with the terminal nitriles (red dashed line).

=== Biological macromolecules ===
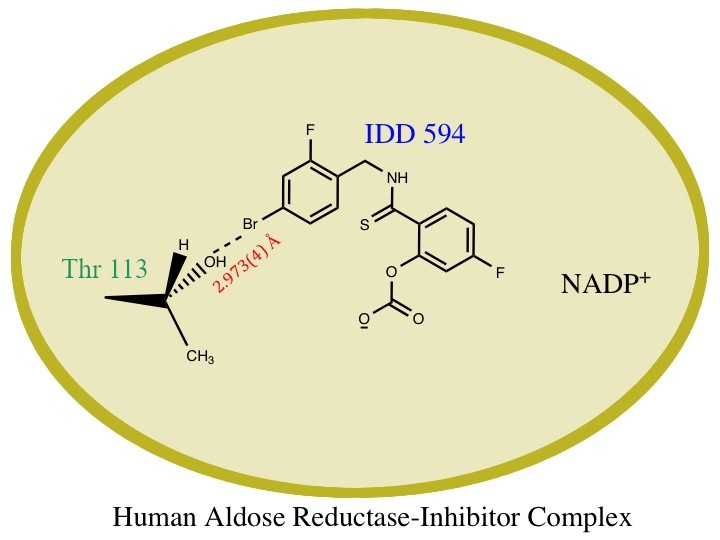
IDD 594 binding to human aldose reductase: a short Br−O halogen bond contributes to inhibitor potency.

Most biological macromolecules contain few or no halogen atoms. But when molecules do contain halogens, halogen bonds are often essential to understanding molecular conformation. Computational studies suggest that known halogenated nucleobases form halogen bonds with oxygen, nitrogen, or sulfur in vitro. Interestingly, oxygen atoms typically do not attract halogens with their lone pairs, but rather the π electrons in the carbonyl or amide group.

Halogen bonding can be significant in drug design as well. For example, inhibitor IDD 594 binds to human aldose reductase through a bromine halogen bond, as shown in the figure. The molecules fail to bind to each other if similar aldehyde reductase replaces the enzyme, or chlorine replaces the drug halogen, because the variant geometries inhibit the halogen bond.

=== Solvation and solubility ===
Halogen bonding can also influence the macroscopic property of solubility. In 2018, Kinzhalov et al. screened a broad range of organometallic species and found that most were more soluble in diiodomethane (CH_{2}I_{2}) than in chloroform (CDCl_{3}) For example, solubility increased from 3 to 38 mg/mL for cis-[PdCl_{2}(CNCH_{2}Ph)_{2}], from 2 to 21 mg/mL for trans-[PtI_{2}(NH_{2}iPr)_{2}], from 13 to 38 mg/mL for [Pd(acac)_{2}], and from 12 to 109 mg/mL for [CuI_{2}(CNXyl)_{4}]. The effect was attributed to the unusually strong σ-hole on the iodine atoms of CH_{2}I_{2} (V_{S}(r)_{max} = 23.1 kcal·mol^{−1}), which forms strong solvent–solute halogen bonds. X-ray structures of a solvates revealed halogen bonds with calculated energies of 2.2–2.5 kcal/mol. However, complexes with aromatic ligands possessing rotational freedom are exceptions, presumably because X–H/π interactions with chloroform compete with halogen bonding.
