= Coordination cage =

Coordination cages are three-dimensional ordered structures in solution that act as hosts in host–guest chemistry. They are self-assembled in solution from organometallic precursors, and often rely solely on noncovalent interactions rather than covalent bonds. Coordinate bonds are useful in such supramolecular self-assembly because of their versatile geometries. However, there is controversy over calling coordinate bonds noncovalent, as they are typically strong bonds and have covalent character. The combination of a coordination cage and a guest is a type of inclusion compound. Coordination complexes can be used as "nano-laboratories" for synthesis, and to isolate interesting intermediates. The inclusion complexes of a guest inside a coordination cage show intriguing chemistry as well; often, the properties of the cage will change depending on the guest. Coordination complexes are molecular moieties, so they are distinct from clathrates and metal-organic frameworks.

== History ==
Chemists have long been interested in mimicking chemical processes in nature. Coordination cages quickly became a hot topic as they can be made by self-assembly, a tool of chemistry in nature. The conceptualization of a closed-surface molecule capable of incorporating a guest was described by Donald Cram in 1985. Early cages were synthesized from bottom-up. Makoto Fujita introduced self-assembling cages, which are less tedious to prepare. These cages arise from the condensation of square planar complexes using polypodal ligands.

== Approaches to assembly ==
There are five main methodologies to create coordination cages. In directional bonding, also called edge-directed self-assembly, polyhedra are designed using a stoichiometric ratio of ligand to metal precursor. The symmetry interaction method involves combining naked metal ions with multibranched chelating ligands. This results in highly symmetric cages. The molecular paneling method, also called the face-directed method, was the method developed by Fujita.

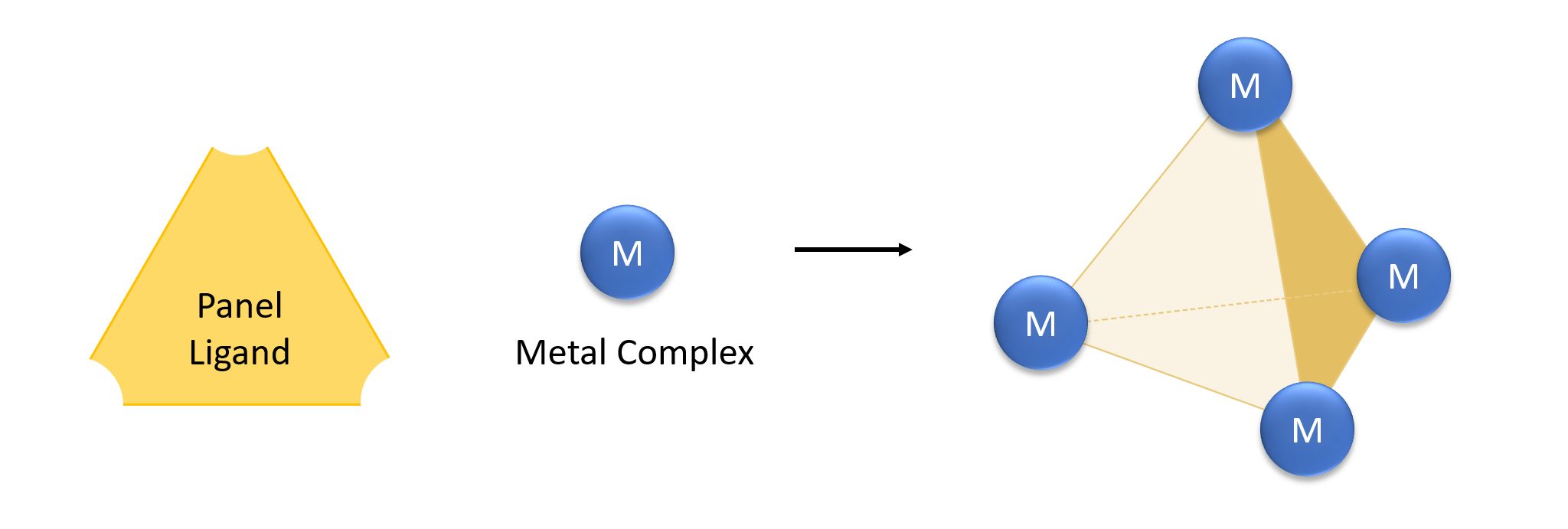
Molecular paneling method

Here, rigid ligands act as 'panels' and coordination complexes join them together to create the shape. In the figure at left, the yellow triangles represent panel ligands, and the blue dots are metal complexes. The ligands of the complex itself helps enforce the final geometry.

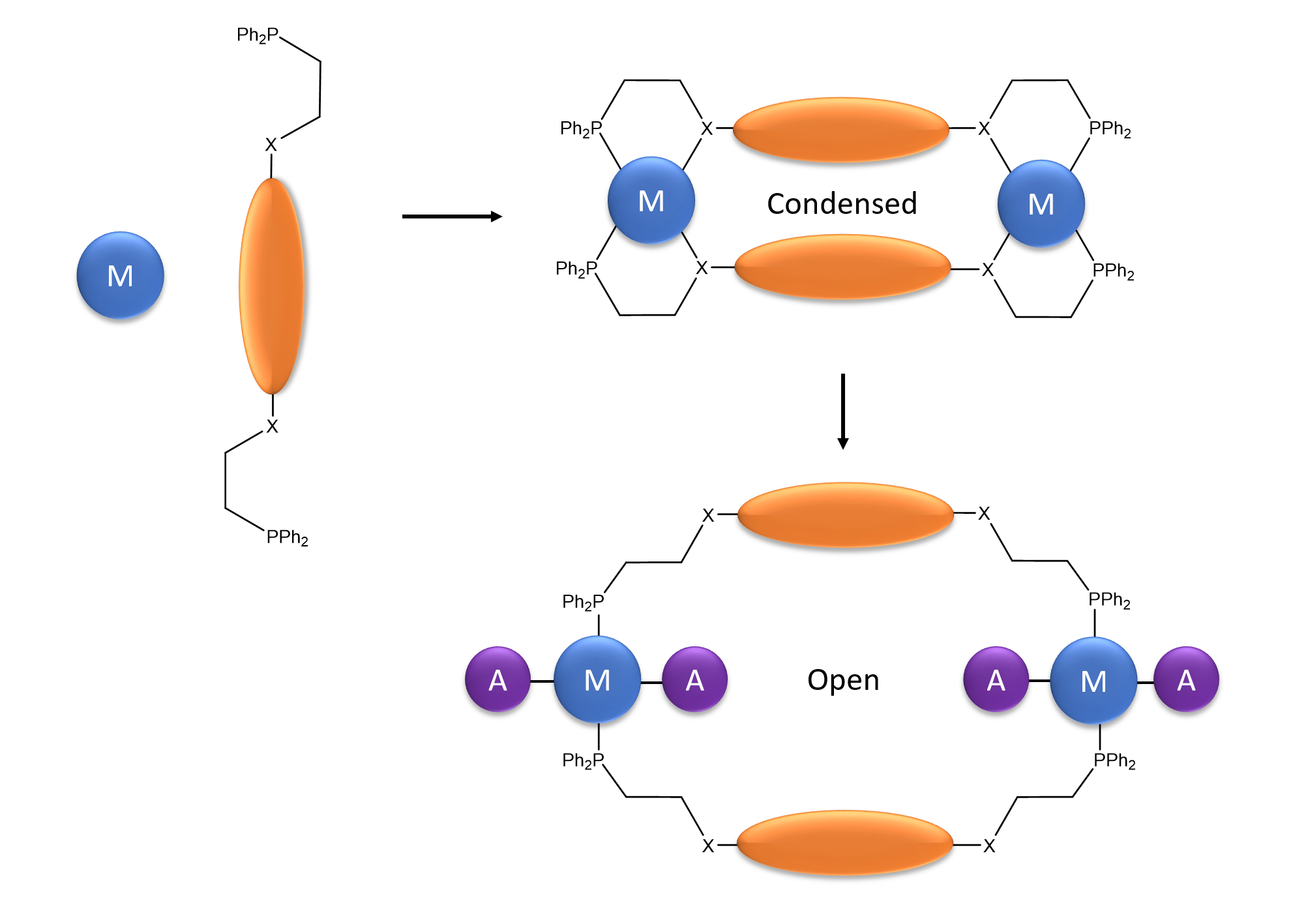
Weak Ligand Method

In the weak link method, a hemilabile ligand is used: a weak metal-heteroatom bond is the 'weak link.' The formation of the complexes is driven by favorable π-π interactions between the spacers and the ligands, as well as the chelation of the metal. The metals used in the assembly must be available to perform further in the final structure, without compromising the cage structure. The initial structure is referred to as 'condensed.' In the condensed structure, the weak M-X bond can be selectively replaced by introducing an ancillary ligand with a higher binding affinity, leading to an open cage structure. In the figure to the right, the M is the metal, the orange ellipses are ligands, and the A is the ancillary ligand. For the dimetallic building block method, two pieces are needed: the metal dimer and its nonlinking ligands, and linking ligands. The nonlinking ligands need to be relatively nonlabile, and not too bulky; amidinates, for instance, work well. The linking ligands are either equatorial or axial: equatorial ligands are small polycarboxylato anions, and axial linkers are usually rigid aromatic structures. Axial and equatorial ligands may be used separately or in combination, depending on the desired cage structure.

== Classification ==
Many varieties of coordination cages exist.

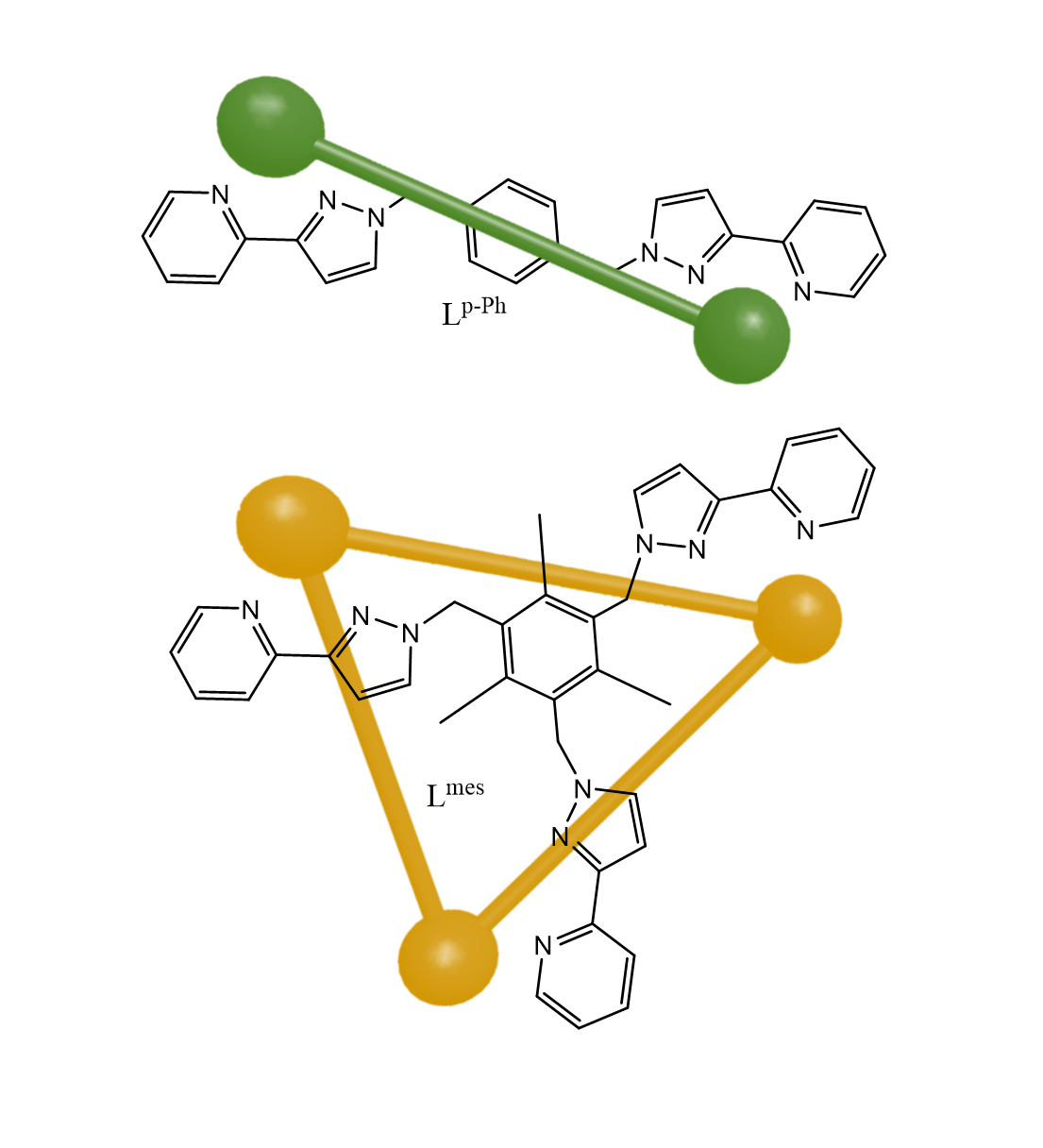
Face and Edge Bridging Ligands used as Building Blocks

In general, coordination cages are either homoleptic or heteroleptic. That is, they assembled either from a single type of ligand or multiple types. Generic coordination cages are often classified just as coordination complexes, with a MxLy formula. Heteroleptic complexes typically form more complex geometries, as illustrated with the following cages: [M_{16}(L^{p-Ph})_{24}]^{32+} and [M_{12}(μ-L^{p-Ph})_{12}(μ^{3}-L^{mes})_{4}](BF_{4})_{24}. The former cage is assembled from a 2:3 ratio of metal (M) and ligand (L), where the metal can be copper, zinc, or cadmium. This cage is homoleptic and assembles into a hexadecanuclear framework. The second cage is assembled from a 4:1:4 ratio of MBF_{4}, the ligand L^{p-Ph} and the ligand L^{mes}. This cage is heteroleptic and assembles into a dodecanuclear cuboctahedral framework. Four of the triangular faces of this shape are occupied by L^{mes}, which acts as a triply bridging ligand. The twelve remaining edges are spanned with the edge ligands, L^{p-Ph}. Ligands are the building blocks of coordination cages, and the choice and ratio of ligands determine the final structure. Due to their highly symmetrical nature, coordination cages are also often referred to by their geometry. The geometry of high-symmetry cages is often that of Platonic or Archimedean solids; sometimes cages are casually referred to by their geometries.

Of the named categories of coordination cages, cavitand cages and metalloprisms are some of the more common.

=== Cavitand cages ===
Cavitand cages are formed by linking bowl-shaped organic molecules called cavitands. The two "bowls" are linked with organometallic complexes.

In order for a cavitand cage to efficiently self-assemble, the following requirements must be met: The cavitand scaffold must be rigid, the incoming metal complex must impose cis geometry, and there must be enough preorganization in the structure such that the entropic barrier to create the cage can be overcome. The complexes used to assemble cavitand cages are square planar with one η2 ligand; this helps enforce the final geometry. Without cis geometry, only small oligomers will form. Self-assembly also requires a ligand exchange; weakly bound ions such as BF_{4}^{-} and PF_{6}^{-} promote assembly because they leave the complex so it can bind with the nitriles on the rest of the structure.

=== Metalloprisms ===
Metalloprisms are another common type of coordination cage. They can be assembled from planar modules linked with column-like ligands.

One illustrative synthesis starts with [(η^{6}-p-cymene)_{6}Ru_{6}(μ_{3}-tpt-κN)_{2}(μ-C_{6}HRO_{4}- κO)_{3}]^{6+} using the linker of 2,4,6-tri(pyridine-4-yl)-1,3,5-triazine (tpt). Various guest molecules have been encapsulated in the hydrophobic cavity of metallaprisms. A few examples of guests are bioconjugate derivatives, metal complexes, and nitroaromatics.

=== Keplerates ===
An Ultra-Large Keplerate Coordination Cage "SK-1A"

Keplerates are cages that are similar to edge-transistive {Cu_{2}} MOFs with A_{4}X_{3} stoichiometry. In fact, they can be thought of as metal-organic polyhedra. These cages are quite different than the types previously discussed as they are much larger, and contain many cavities. Complexes with large diameters can be desirable as target guest molecules are becoming more large and complex. These cages have multiple shells, like an onion. Secondary building units such as dinuclear {Cu_{2}} acetate species are used as building blocks.

In the cage above, the outer shell is a cuboctohedron; its structure comes from two adjacent benzoate moieties from the m-BTEB ligand. The third benzoate is attached to the inner shell. The {Cu_{2}} units in the inner sphere adapt several different orientations. The labile complexes in the inner sphere allow binding of large target guests on the nanometer scale. Building a complex of this size that is still soluble is a challenge.

== Interactions ==
Coordination cages are used to study guest-guest and host–guest interactions and reactions.

In some instance, planar aromatic molecules stack inside of metalloprisms, as can be observed by UV-visible spectroscopy. Metal-metal interactions can also be observed. Mixed valence species have also been trapped inside of coordination cages.
