= Heavy liquid =

High density solution

A heavy liquid is a solution or liquid chemical substance with a high density and a relatively low viscosity. Heavy liquids are often used for determination of density in mineralogy, for density gradient centrifugation and for separating mixtures.

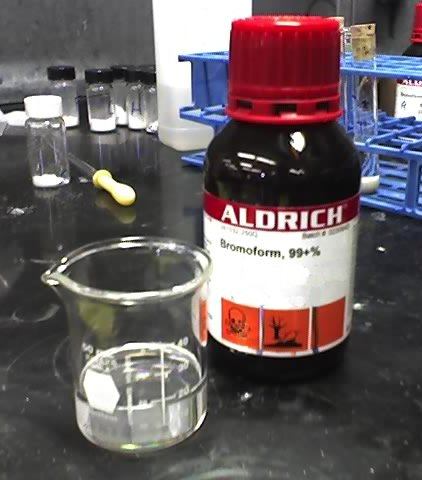
A bottle of bromoform, a heavy liquid

== Uses ==
Common applications of heavy liquids include:

- Density gradient centrifugation
- Separating mixtures and sink/swim analysis
- Flotation process
- Determination of density

== Toxicity ==
The classical heavy liquids like 1,1,2,2-tetrabromoethane (Muthmann's solution), potassium tetraiodomercurate(II) (Thoulet's solution), bromoform, or diiodomethane which are used in mineralogy are very toxic.

These toxic chemicals are avoided today in consideration of the fact that there are alternative water-based, non-toxic heavy liquids like sodium polytungstate solutions. With this relatively new heavy liquid, densities up to 3.1 g·cm^{−3} can be adjusted. Adding parts of pulverulent tungsten carbide increases the density to 4.6 g·cm^{−3}.

== List of common heavy liquids with density > 2.0 g·cm^{−3} ==
| Name | Density (g·cm^{−3}) |
|---|---|
| 1,2-Dibromoethane | 2.180 |
| cis-1,2-Dibromoethene | 2.246 |
| trans-1,2-Dibromoethene | 2.231 |
| Dibromomethane | 2.477 |
| Bromal | 2.550 |
| Bromoform | 2.890 |
| 1,1,2,2-Tetrabromoethane (Muthmanns solution) | 2.967 |
| Sodium polytungstate | 3.100 |
| Bromine | 3.1028 |
| Thoulets solution | 3.196 |
| Diiodomethane | 3.325 |
| Indium(III) iodide | 3.40 |
| Barium tetraiodomercurate(II) (Rohrbach's solution) | 3.57 |
| Thallium formate + thallium malonate (Clerici solution) | 4.25 |
| Galinstan (gallium, indium, tin alloy) | 6.44 |
| Mercury | 13.6 |

Mercury is the heaviest liquid at room temperature. But the heaviest liquid irrespective of temperature is liquid osmium (a rare metal) at its melting point (3033°C/5491.4°F), with a density of 22.59 g·cm^{−3}, 1.65 times as heavy as mercury.

== Literature ==
- Schnitzer W, Zur Problematik der Schwermineralanalyse am Beispiel triassischer Sedimentgesteine, in International Journal of Earth Sciences, 72/1983, S.67–75, ISSN 1437-3254 (Print) 1437-3262 (Online)
- Boenigk, Schwermineralanalyse, S.6–15, Stuttgart: Enke, 1983.
- Ney, Gesteinsaufbereitung im Labor, S.92–113, Stuttgart: Enke, 1986.
