= Clerici =

Clerici is an Italian surname.

- Clerici family, noble family from Milan, originally from Domaso, Lake Como

Notable people with the surname include:

- Alfonsa Clerici (1860–1930), Italian religious figure of the Sisters of the Most Precious Blood
- Alice Clerici (born 1996), Italian fencer
- Antonella Clerici (born 1963), Italian television host
- Carlo Clerici (1929–2007), Swiss bicycle racer
- Colombo Clerici, 20th-century Italian lawyer and author
- Enrico Clerici (1862–1938), Italian mineralogist and geologist, creator of the chemical Clerici solution
- Fabrizio Clerici (1913–1993), Italian painter
- Filippo Clerici (born 2001), Italian figure skater
- Gianfranco Clerici (born 1941), Italian screenwriter
- Gianni Clerici (1930–2022), Italian tennis player, journalist and commentator
- Maurizio Clerici (1929–2019), Italian rower
- Roberto Clerici the Younger (fl. 1711–1748), Italian painter
- Serena Clerici (born 1971), Italian voice actress
- Sergio Clerici (born 1941), Brazilian footballer
- Umberto Clerici (born 1981), Italian cellist and conductor

== Buildings ==
- Palazzo Clerici, via Clerici, in Milan
- Palazzo Clerici (Castelletto di Cuggiono), in the hamlet Castelletto di Cuggiono
- Villa Clerici, in the Niguarda quarter of Milan

== Companies ==
- Coeclerici, company founded in Genoa in 1895 by Alfonso Clerici and Henry Coe.
