= Dibromoethane =

Dibromoethane can refer to either of two isomeric organobromides with the molecular formula C_{2}H_{4}Br_{2}:

- 1,1-Dibromoethane (ethylidene dibromide)
- 1,2-Dibromoethane (ethylene dibromide)

== See also ==
- Dibromoethene
