= C2H4Br2 =

The molecular formula C_{2}H_{4}Br_{2} (molar mass: 187.86 g/mol, exact mass: 185.8680 u) may refer to:

- 1,1-Dibromoethane (ethylidene dibromide)
- 1,2-Dibromoethane, or ethylene dibromide (EDB)
