= Clérico =

Clérico is an Italian surname. Notable people with the surname include:

- Emmanuel Clérico (born 1969), French racing driver
- Francesco Clerico (c. 1755–1838), Italian ballet dancer, choreographer and composer. Was active since 1776 in Teatro di Sant'Agostino (Genoa), La Scala (Milan), Teatro San Samuele and La Fenice (Venice).
- Jacki Clérico (1929–2013), French businessman
- Nicole Clerico (born 1983), Italian tennis player

Clerico may also refer to:

- Piana Clerico, a clothing company in Biella, Piedmont, Italy
- 25905 Clerico, an asteroid
- Clericó, a Latin American drink similar to sangria

== See also ==
- Clerici
