= C3H6Br2 =

The molecular formula C_{3}H_{6}Br_{2} (molar mass: 201.889 g/mol, exact mass: 199.8836 u) may refer to:

- 1,2-Dibromopropane, also known as propylene dibromide
- 1,3-Dibromopropane
