= Sodium metatungstate =

Identifiers
CAS Number	314075-43-9
3D model (JSmol)	Interactive image
ChemSpider	26404834
EC Number	412-770-9
PubChem CID	71311259
- InChI: InChI=1S/6Na.H2O.39O.12W/h;;;;;;1H2;;;;;;;;;;;;;;;;;;;;;;;;;;;;;;;;;;;;;;;;;;;;;;;;;;;/q6*+1;;;;;;;;;;;;;;;;;;;;;;;;;;;;;;;;;;;6*-1;;;;;;;;;;;; Key: YVQUUPJGDSQKML-UHFFFAOYSA-N
- SMILES: O.[O-][W](=O)(=O)[O-].[O-][W](=O)(=O)[O-].[O-][W](=O)(=O)[O-].O=[W](=O)=O.O=[W](=O)=O.O=[W](=O)=O.O=[W](=O)=O.O=[W](=O)=O.O=[W](=O)=O.O=[W](=O)=O.O=[W](=O)=O.O=[W](=O)=O.[Na+].[Na+].[Na+].[Na+].[Na+].[Na+]

Properties
Chemical formula	H_{2}Na_{6}O_{40}W_{12}
Molar mass	2985.99 g·mol^{−1}
- Except where otherwise noted, data are given for materials in their standard state (at 25 °C [77 °F], 100 kPa). Infobox references

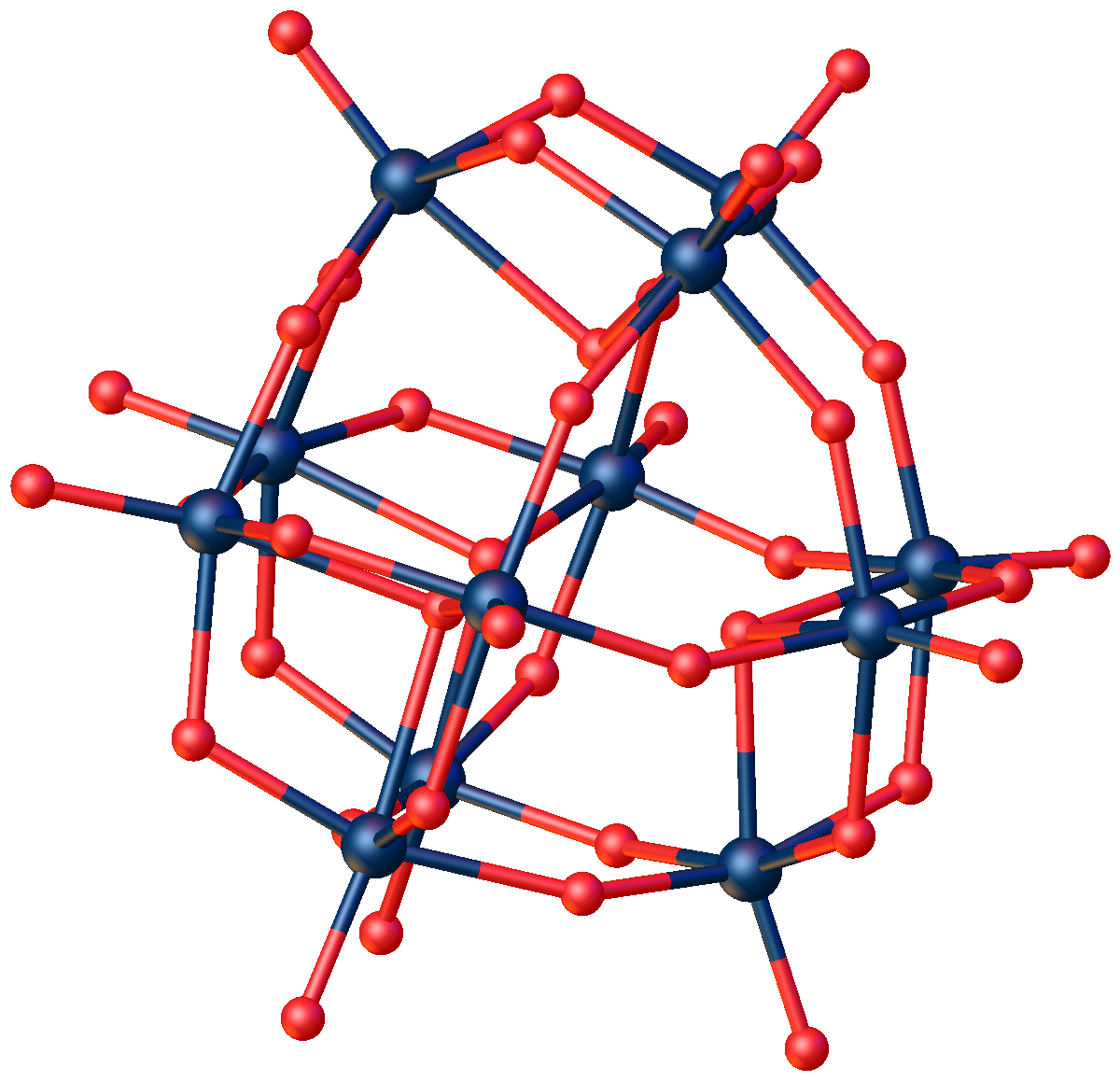
The [W_{12}O_{40}]^{8-} cage. Metatungstates feature the doubly protonated derivative of this cage, i.e. [H_{2}W_{12}O_{40}]^{6-}.

Sodium metatungstate is the inorganic compound with the formula Na_{6}[H_{2}W_{12}O_{40}], sometimes written 3Na_{2}WO_{4}·9WO_{3}·H_{2}O. It is also referred to as sodium polytungstate (SPT). This salt has been used in the manufacture of dense aqueous solutions. Sodium metatungstate exists as white solid. The anion is the polyoxotungstate [H_{2}W_{12}O_{40}]^{6-}, which features six-coordinated tungsten(VI) centers interconnected with doubly- and triply bridging oxo ligands.

Due to its very high solubility in water (max. density 3.1 g/cm^{3}), SPT is widely used as to produce "heavy liquid" for gravity separation (sink /float analysis) and density gradient centrifugation. It has significant advantages when compared to zinc chloride solution or the toxic halogenated carbons for sink-swim analysis. Aqueous SPT is non-toxic (unlike the denser Clerici solution), non-flammable, odorless, reusable and additionally it has a low viscosity.
