= Silver tetraiodomercurate(II) =

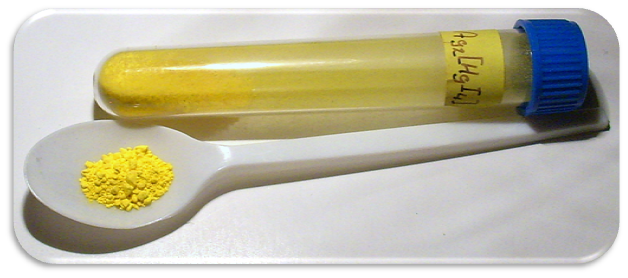

Names
- Preferred IUPAC name Silver tetraiodomercurate(II)

Identifiers
CAS Number	7784-03-4
3D model (JSmol)	Interactive image
ECHA InfoCard	100.029.132
EC Number	235-601-9
PubChem CID	9941088
UNII	SOM6DF79O4
CompTox Dashboard (EPA)	DTXSID00999046
- InChI: InChI=1S/2Ag.Hg.4HI/h;;;4*1H/q2*+1;+2;;;;/p-4 Key: YNTJRFXPYRRRKS-UHFFFAOYSA-J
- SMILES: [Ag+].[Ag+].I[Hg-2](I)(I)I

Properties
Chemical formula	Ag_{2}HgI_{4}
Molar mass	923.946 g·mol^{−1}

Hazards
- GHS labelling
Pictograms	(GHS06: Toxic) (GHS08: Health hazard) (GHS09: Environmental hazard)
Signal word	Danger
Hazard statements	H300, H310, H330, H373, H410
Precautionary statements	P260, P262, P264, P270, P271, P273, P280, P284, P301+P316, P302+P352, P304+P340, P316, P319, P320, P321, P330, P361+P364, P391, P403+P233, P405, P501
- Except where otherwise noted, data are given for materials in their standard state (at 25 °C [77 °F], 100 kPa). Infobox references

Silver tetraiodomercurate(II), the inorganic chemical having chemical formula Ag_{2}HgI_{4}, is a salt containing silver as cations and the tetraiodomercurate(II) polyatomic metal complex as dianion. This compound is thermochromic, reversibly changing from yellow below 50 °C to orange at higher temperature. This color change is an effect of a change from a highly ordered phase, with the silver ions rigidly held in the crystal structure, to one in which the silver ions are randomly distributed and freely moving. It is polycrystalline material whose free ions give it strong enough electrolyte properties for it to be considered a superionic conductor.

A film of silver tetraiodomercurate (II) wih additional mercurous and silver halide salts changes color in response to moisture in a predictable way, allowing its use for measuring of humidity and sweating.

The presence of various additives can alter the phase-transition temperature.
