= Tetraiodomercurate(II) =

Inorganic dianion

Names
- Preferred IUPAC name tetraiodomercurate(II)
- Systematic IUPAC name tetraiodomercury(2-)

Identifiers
CAS Number	14876-64-3
3D model (JSmol)	Interactive image
ChEBI	CHEBI:36576
ChemSpider	22949
Gmelin Reference	130791
PubChem CID	24543
- InChI: InChI=1S/Hg.4HI/h;4*1H/q+2;;;;/p-4 Key: RSBGXBMIRUIJTD-UHFFFAOYSA-J
- SMILES: I[Hg-2](I)(I)I

Properties
Chemical formula	HgI^{2−}_{4}
Molar mass	708.211 g·mol^{−1}
- Except where otherwise noted, data are given for materials in their standard state (at 25 °C [77 °F], 100 kPa). Infobox references

Tetraiodomercurate(II) is an inorganic dianion that is found in potassium tetraiodomercurate(II), as well as various other salts. Tetraiodomercurate(II) has the chemical formula HgI^{2−}_{4}. The central mercury atom in this coordination complex has a +2 oxidation state. Although the complex has tetrahedral molecular geometry, its exact geometry can be influenced by hydrogen bonding to the iodine atoms.

== Salts ==
At room temperature, salts of tetraiodomercurate(II) come in various colors ranging from red to light yellow.

Silver tetraiodomercurate(II) and copper tetraiodomercurate(II), Ag_{2}HgI_{4} and Cu_{2}HgI_{4} respectively, can be generated from the precursor potassium tetraiodomercurate(II) and are thermochromic. Its indium, gold, thallium, rubidium, cesium, and lithium salts are not thermochromic.

The aqueous solution of its barium salt, barium tetraiodomercurate(II) (BaHgI_{4}), is known as Rohrbach's solution and has historically been used as a heavy liquid.

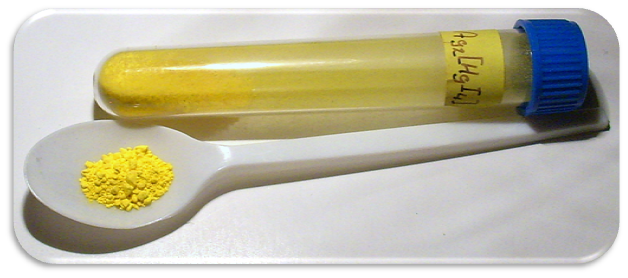
A sample of silver tetraiodomercurate(II)

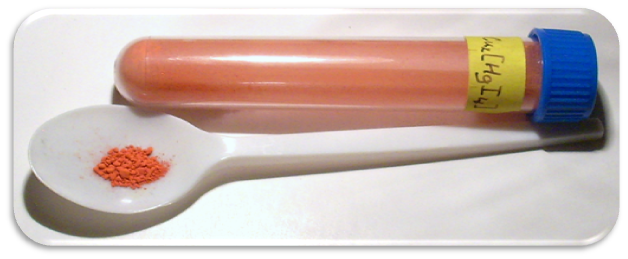
A sample of copper tetraiodomercurate(II)
