= Gravity separation =

Gravity separation is an industrial method of separating two components, either a suspension, or dry granular mixture where separating the components with gravity is sufficiently practical: i.e. the components of the mixture have different specific weight. Every gravitational method uses gravity as the primary force for separation. One type of gravity separator lifts the material by vacuum over an inclined vibrating screen covered deck. This results in the material being suspended in air while the heavier impurities are left behind on the screen and are discharged from the stone outlet. Gravity separation is used in a wide variety of industries, and can be most simply differentiated by the characteristics of the mixture to be separated - principally that of 'wet' i.e. - a suspension versus 'dry' -a mixture of granular product. Often other methods are applied to make the separation faster and more efficient, such as flocculation, coagulation and suction. The most notable advantages of the gravitational methods are their cost effectiveness and in some cases excellent reduction. Gravity separation is an attractive unit operation as it generally has low capital and operating costs, uses few if any chemicals that might cause environmental concerns and the recent development of new equipment enhances the range of separations possible.

== Examples of application ==
Agriculture- Gravity separation tables are used for the removal of impurities, admixture, insect damage and immature kernels from the following examples: wheat, barley, oilseed rape, peas, beans, cocoa beans, linseed. They can be used to separate and standardize coffee beans, cocoa beans, peanuts, corn, peas, rice, wheat, sesame and other food grains.

The gravity separator separates products of same size but with difference in specific weight. It has a vibrating rectangular deck, which makes it easy for the product to travel a longer distance, ensuring improved quality of the end product. The pressurized air in the deck enables the material to split according to its specific weight. As a result, the heavier particles travel to the higher level while the lighter particles travel to the lower level of the deck. It comes with easily adjustable air fans to control the volume of air distribution at different areas of the vibrating deck to meet the air supply needs of the deck. The table inclination, speed of eccentric motion and the feed rate can be precisely adjusted to achieve smooth operation of the machine.

== Preferential flotation ==
Heavy liquids such as tetrabromoethane can be used to separate ores from supporting rocks by preferential flotation. The rocks are crushed, and while sand, limestone, dolomite, and other types of rock material will float on TBE, ores such as sphalerite, galena and pyrite will sink.

== Clarification/thickening ==
Clarification is a name for the method of separating fluid from solid particles. Often clarification is used along with flocculation to make the solid particles sink faster to the bottom of the clarification pool while fluid is obtained from the surface which is free of solid particles.

Thickening is the same as clarification except reverse. Solids that sink to the bottom are obtained and fluid is rejected from the surface.

The difference of these methods could be demonstrated with the methods used in waste water processing: in the clarification phase, sludge sinks to the bottom of the pool and clear water flows over the clear water grooves and continues its journey. The obtained sludge is then pumped into the thickeners, where sludge thickens farther and is then obtained to be pumped into digestion to be prepared into fertilizer.

== Sinking chamber ==
When clearing gases, an often used and mostly working method for clearing large particles is to blow it into a large chamber where the gas's velocity decreases and the solid particles start sinking to the bottom. This method is used mostly because of its cheap cost.

== Types of gravity separators ==
- Conventional jigs
- Pinched sluices
  - Reichert Cones
- Spirals
- Centrifugal jigs
- Shaking tables
