= Bromoform (data page) =

Chemical data page

This page provides supplementary chemical data on bromoform.

== Material Safety Data Sheet ==
The handling of this chemical may incur notable safety precautions. It is highly recommend that you seek the Material Safety Datasheet (MSDS) for this chemical from a reliable source and follow its directions.

- SIRI
- Science Stuff

== Structure and properties ==
Structure and properties
Dielectric constant, ε_{r}	4.404 ε_{0} at 10 °C
Surface tension	44.87 mN/m at 25 °C; 41.60 mN/m at 50 °C; 38.3 mN/m at 75 °C
Viscosity	1.857 mPa·s at 25 °C; 1.367 mPa·s at 50 °C; 1.029 mPa·s at 75 °C

== Thermodynamic properties ==
Phase behavior
Triple point	281.84 K (8.69 °C), ? Pa
Critical point	? K (? °C), ? Pa
Std enthalpy change of fusion, Δ_{fus}H^{~~o~~}	11.046 kJ/mol
Std entropy change of fusion, Δ_{fus}S^{~~o~~}	39.2 J/(mol·K)
Std enthalpy change of vaporization, Δ_{vap}H^{~~o~~}	46.06 kJ/mol
Std entropy change of vaporization, Δ_{vap}S^{~~o~~}	? J/(mol·K)
Solid properties
Std enthalpy change of formation, Δ_{f}H^{~~o~~}_{solid}	? kJ/mol
Standard molar entropy, S^{~~o~~}_{solid}	? J/(mol K)
Heat capacity, c_{p}	? J/(mol K)
Liquid properties
Std enthalpy change of formation, Δ_{f}H^{~~o~~}_{liquid}	9.4 kJ/mol
Standard molar entropy, S^{~~o~~}_{liquid}	? J/(mol K)
Heat capacity, c_{p}	130.5 J/(mol K)
Enthalpy of combustion, Δ_{c}H^{~~o~~}_{liquid}	-545.8 kJ/mol
Gas properties
Std enthalpy change of formation, Δ_{f}H^{~~o~~}_{gas}	55.4 kJ/mol
Standard molar entropy, S^{~~o~~}_{gas}	? J/(mol K)
Heat capacity, c_{p}	? J/(mol K)

Enthalpy of combustion

== Spectral data ==
UV-Vis
NMR
Proton NMR	6.88ppm;
Carbon-13 NMR
Other NMR data
MS
Masses of main fragments
