= 1,2,3-Tribromopropane =

- Skeletal formula of 1,2,3-tribromopropane

Names
- Preferred IUPAC name 1,2,3-Tribromopropane
- Other names: Glyceryl tribromohydrin; sym-Tribromopropane

Identifiers
CAS Number	96-11-7
3D model (JSmol)	Interactive image
Beilstein Reference	1732082
ChEBI	CHEBI:18859
ChemSpider	7007
ECHA InfoCard	100.002.254
EC Number	202-478-8
Gmelin Reference	101184
PubChem CID	7279
RTECS number	TZ8300000
UNII	D2R8L96TOV
CompTox Dashboard (EPA)	DTXSID9059129
- InChI: InChI=1S/C3H5Br3/c4-1-3(6)2-5/h3H,1-2H2 Key: FHCLGDLYRUPKAM-UHFFFAOYSA-N
- SMILES: BrCC(Br)CBr

Properties
Chemical formula	C_{3}H_{5}Br_{3}
Molar mass	280.785 g·mol^{−1}
Appearance	Colorless liquid
Density	2.398 g mL^{−1}
Melting point	16.2 °C; 61.1 °F; 289.3 K
Boiling point	220.1 °C; 428.1 °F; 493.2 K
Magnetic susceptibility (χ)	−117.9·10^{−6} cm^{3}/mol
Refractive index (n_{D})	1.584

Thermochemistry
Heat capacity (C)	166.5 J K^{−1} mol^{−1}

Hazards
- GHS labelling
Pictograms	(GHS07: Exclamation mark) (GHS08: Health hazard)
Signal word	Warning
Hazard statements	H302, H312, H315, H319, H332, H335, H351
Precautionary statements	P261, P280, P305+P351+P338
Flash point	93 °C (199 °F; 366 K)

Related compounds
Related alkanes	1,1-Dibromoethane; 1,2-Dibromoethane; Tetrabromoethane; 1,2-Dibromopropane; 1,3-Dibromopropane
Related compounds	Mitobronitol
- Except where otherwise noted, data are given for materials in their standard state (at 25 °C [77 °F], 100 kPa). verify (what is ?) Infobox references

1,2,3-Tribromopropane (TBP) is a toxic organic compound. It is a clear colorless to light yellow liquid.
