= Mitobronitol =

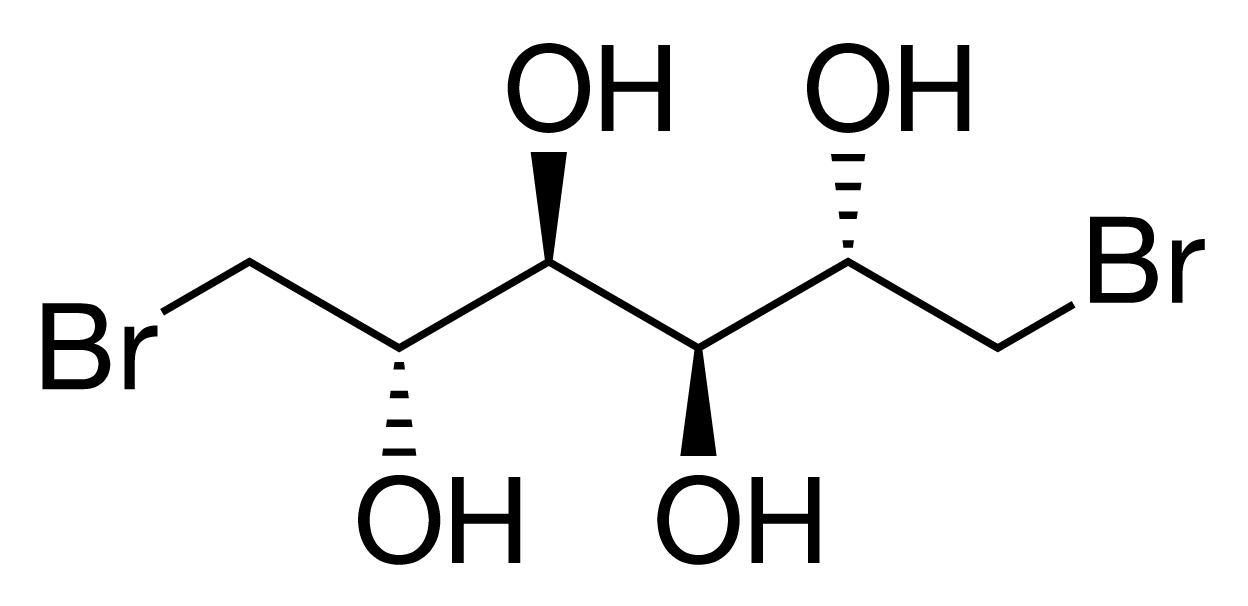
- Stereo, skeletal formula of mitobronitol (2S,3S,4S,5S)-2,3,4,5-tetrol

Names
- Preferred IUPAC name 1,6-Dibromo-1,6-dideoxy-D-mannitol
- Systematic IUPAC name 1,6-Dibromohexane-2,3,4,5-tetrol

Identifiers
CAS Number	488-41-5 (2S,3S,4S,5S)-2,3,4,5-tetrol
3D model (JSmol)	Interactive image
ChEMBL	ChEMBL161657; ChEMBL447629
ChemSpider	4063; 5145112 (2S,3S,5R)-2,3,5-triol; 5145112 (2R,3R,4R,5R)-2,3,4,5-tetrol
ECHA InfoCard	100.006.979
EC Number	207-676-8
KEGG	D02020
MeSH	Mitobronitol
PubChem CID	4208; 44119013 (2R,3R)-2,3-diol; 6713087 (2S,3S,5R)-2,3,5-triol; 2794952 (2R,3R,4R,5R)-2,3,4,5-tetrol; 656655 (2S,3S,4S,5S)-2,3,4,5-tetrol
RTECS number	OP2800000 (2RS,3RS,4RS,5RS)-2,3,4,5-tetrol
UNII	5UP30YED7N
CompTox Dashboard (EPA)	DTXSID3048158 DTXSID7022918, DTXSID3048158
- InChI: InChI=1S/C6H12Br2O4/c7-1-3(9)5(11)6(12)4(10)2-8/h3-6,9-12H,1-2H2 Key: VFKZTMPDYBFSTM-UHFFFAOYSA-N
- SMILES: OC(CBr)C(O)C(O)C(O)CBr

Properties
Chemical formula	C_{6}H_{12}Br_{2}O_{4}
Molar mass	307.966 g·mol^{−1}
Appearance	Colourless crystals
log P	−0.226 (2RS,3RS,4RS,5RS)-2,3,4,5-tetrol
Acidity (pK_{a})	12.609 (2RS,3RS,4RS,5RS)-2,3,4,5-tetrol
Basicity (pK_{b})	1.388 (2RS,3RS,4RS,5RS)-2,3,4,5-tetrol

Pharmacology
ATC code	L01AX01 (WHO)

Related compounds
Related compounds	1,2-Dibromopropane; 1,3-Dibromopropane; 1,2,3-Tribromopropane
- Except where otherwise noted, data are given for materials in their standard state (at 25 °C [77 °F], 100 kPa). Infobox references

Mitobronitol (1,6-dibromo-1,6-dideoxy-D-mannitol) is a brominated analog of mannitol. It is an anticancer drug that is also classified as an alkylating agent.
