= Julius Neßler =

German chemist (1827–1905)

- Born: 6 June 1827; Kehl, Grand Duchy of Baden
- Died: 19 March 1905 (aged 77); Karlsruhe, Germany
- Education: University of Freiburg

Julius Neßler (6 June 1827 – 19 March 1905) was a German chemist. He devised the chemical solution Nessler's reagent which provides a colorimetric measure of ammonia concentration.

== Biography ==
Neßler was born in 1827. He studied at the University of Freiburg from 1853 to 1856, when he attained his PhD. After his Ph.D. Neßler worked for some months with Lambert Heinrich von Babo and Robert Wilhelm Bunsen and then joined a chemical company in Karlsruhe. He died on 19 March 1905.

== Nessler cylinder ==
A Nessler cylinder is a simple type of colorimeter. It is best known for use with Nessler's reagent but can be used for any colorimetric chemical test. In practice, a pair of tubes is used, set on a white background. One tube is filled with color reagent and a known quantity of sample to act as a reference. The sample to be tested is mixed with color reagent in a beaker and the color is allowed to develop. The mixture is then poured, a little at a time, into the second tube until the intensity of color in the two tubes is identical. The heights of the liquid columns in the two tubes are measured and the concentration of the sample solution can be calculated using the Beer–Lambert law.
