= Carbon tetrabromide =

- Stereo, skeletal formula of tetrabromomethane

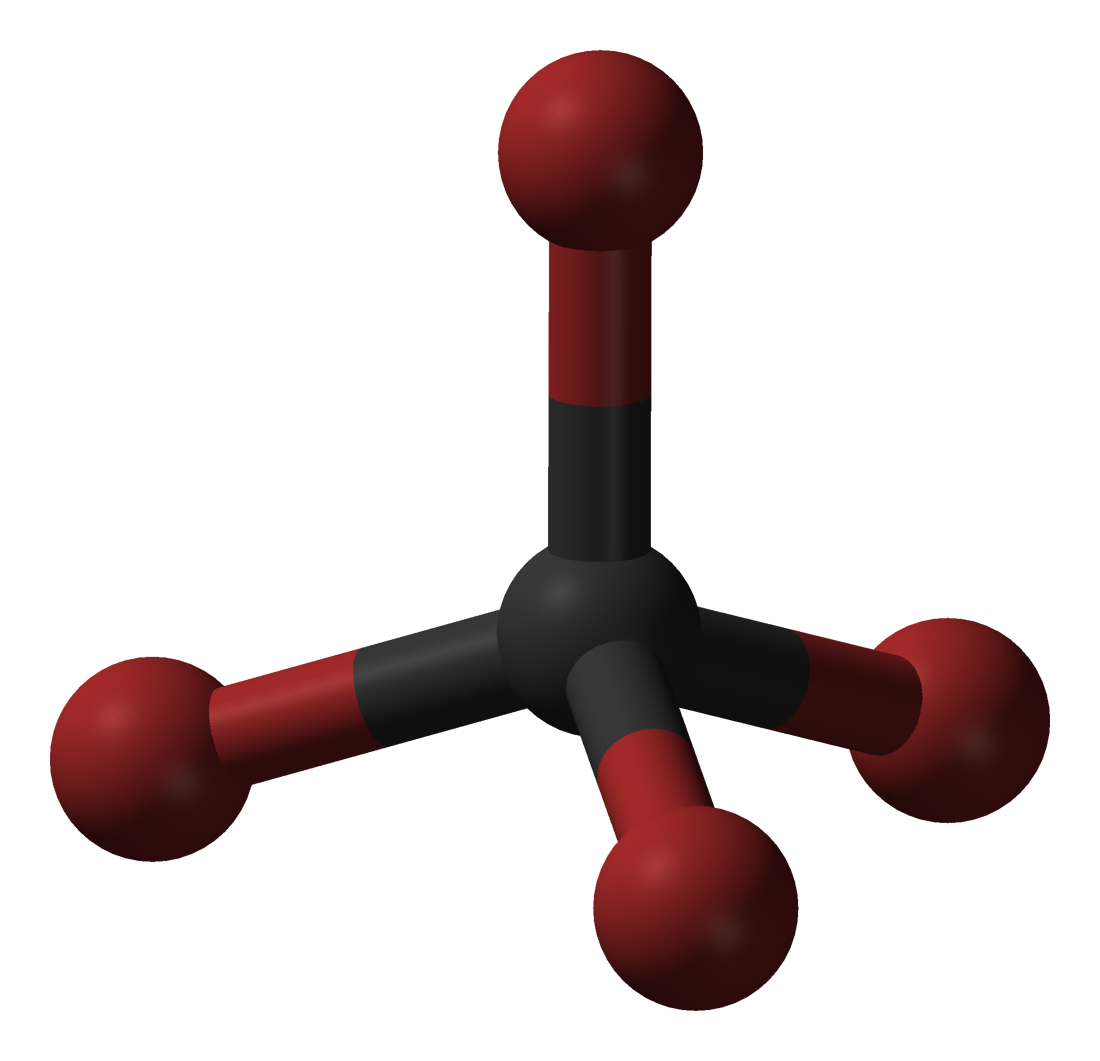
Stereo, skeletal formula of tetrabromomethane
Spacefill model of tetrabromomethane
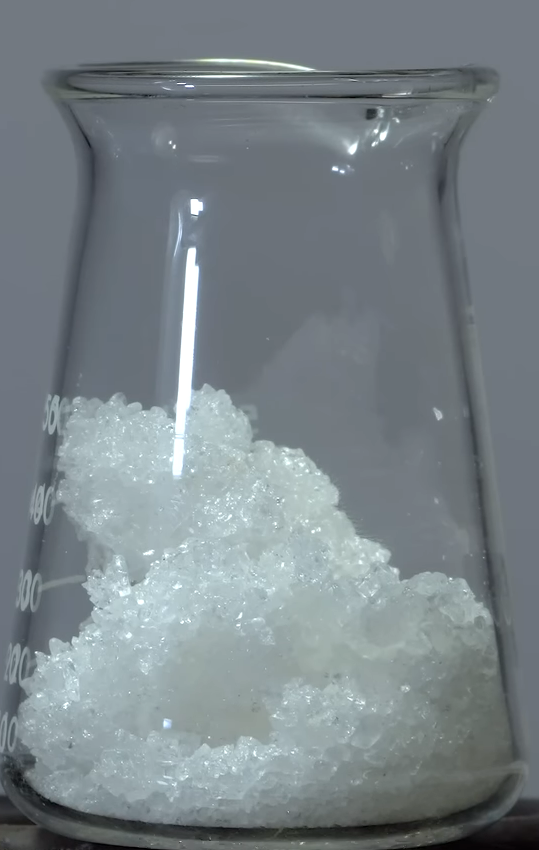

Names
- Preferred IUPAC name Tetrabromomethane
- Other names: Carbon(IV) bromide; Carbon bromide, neutral (1:4); Carbon tetrabromide

Identifiers
CAS Number	558-13-4
3D model (JSmol)	Interactive image
Abbreviations	R-10B4
Beilstein Reference	1732799
ChEBI	CHEBI:47875
ChemSpider	10732
ECHA InfoCard	100.008.355
EC Number	209-189-6
Gmelin Reference	26450
MeSH	carbon+tetrabromide
PubChem CID	11205
RTECS number	FG4725000
UNII	NLH657095L
UN number	2516
CompTox Dashboard (EPA)	DTXSID8060327
- InChI: InChI=1S/CBr4/c2-1(3,4)5 Key: HJUGFYREWKUQJT-UHFFFAOYSA-N
- SMILES: BrC(Br)(Br)Br

Properties
Chemical formula	CBr_{4}
Molar mass	331.627 g·mol^{−1}
Appearance	Colorless to yellow-brown crystals
Odor	sweet odor
Density	3.42 g mL^{−1}
Melting point	94.5 °C; 202.0 °F; 367.6 K
Boiling point	189.7 °C; 373.4 °F; 462.8 K decomposes
Solubility in water	0.024 g/100 mL (30 °C)
Solubility	soluble in ether, chloroform, ethanol
Vapor pressure	5.33 kPa (at 96.3 °C)
Magnetic susceptibility (χ)	−93.73·10^{−6} cm^{3}/mol
Refractive index (n_{D})	1.5942 (100 °C)

Structure
Crystal structure	Monoclinic
Coordination geometry	Tetragonal
Molecular shape	Tetrahedron
Dipole moment	0 D

Thermochemistry
Heat capacity (C)	0.4399 J K^{−1} g^{−1}
Std molar entropy (S^{⦵}_{298})	212.5 J/mol K
Std enthalpy of formation (Δ_{f}H^{⦵}_{298})	26.0–32.8 kJ mol^{−1}
Gibbs free energy (Δ_{f}G^{⦵})	47.7 kJ/mol
Std enthalpy of combustion (Δ_{c}H^{⦵}_{298})	−426.2–−419.6 kJ mol^{−1}

Hazards
- GHS labelling
Pictograms	(GHS05: Corrosive) (GHS07: Exclamation mark)
Signal word	Danger
Hazard statements	H302, H315, H318, H335
Precautionary statements	P261, P280, P305+P351+P338
NFPA 704 (fire diamond)	2 0 0
Flash point	noncombustible
- Lethal dose or concentration (LD, LC)
LD_{50} (median dose)	56 mg kg^{−1} (intravenous, mouse); 100 mg kg^{−1} (oral, rat)
- NIOSH (US health exposure limits)
PEL (Permissible)	none
REL (Recommended)	TWA 0.1 ppm (1.4 mg/m^{3}) ST 0.3 ppm (4 mg/m^{3})
IDLH (Immediate danger)	N.D.
Safety data sheet (SDS)	inchem.org

Related compounds
Other anions	Carbon tetrafluoride Carbon tetrachloride Carbon tetraiodide
Other cations	Silicon tetrabromide Germanium tetrabromide Tin(IV) bromide
Related alkanes	Dibromomethane; Bromoform; 1,1-Dibromoethane; 1,2-Dibromoethane; Tetrabromoethane
- Except where otherwise noted, data are given for materials in their standard state (at 25 °C [77 °F], 100 kPa). verify (what is ?) Infobox references

Carbon tetrabromide, CBr_{4}, also known as tetrabromomethane, is a bromide of carbon. Both names are acceptable under IUPAC nomenclature.

== Production ==
CBr_{4} can be obtained by the bromination of methane. The byproducts include other brominated methanes (methyl bromide, dibromomethane and bromoform) and hydrogen bromide. This process is analogous to the chlorination of methane:

Br_{2} + hν → 2 Br·;
Br· + CH_{4} → ·CH_{3} + HBr.
·CH_{3} + Br_{2} → CH_{3}Br + Br·.
CH_{3}Br + Br· → ·CH_{2}Br + HBr,
·CH_{2}Br + Br_{2} → CH_{2}Br_{2} + Br·,
CH_{2}Br_{2} + Br· → ·CHBr_{2} + HBr,
·CHBr_{2} + Br_{2} → CHBr_{3} + Br·,
CHBr_{3} + Br· → ·CBr_{3} + HBr,
·CBr_{3} + Br_{2} → CBr_{4} + Br·

Halogen exchange of carbon tetrachloride with aluminium bromide gives higher yields with aluminium chloride as the byproduct:

4 AlBr_{3} + 3 CCl_{4} → 4 AlCl_{3} + 3 CBr_{4}

== Physical properties ==
Tetrabromomethane has two polymorphs: crystalline II or β below 46.9 °C (320.0 K) and crystalline I or α above 46.9 °C. Monoclinic polymorph has space group C2/c with lattice constants: a = 20.9, b = 12.1, c = 21.2 (.10^{−1} nm), β = 110.5°. Bond energy of C–Br is 235 kJ.mol^{−1}.

Due to its symmetrically substituted tetrahedral structure, its dipole moment is 0 Debye. Critical temperature is 439 °C (712 K) and critical pressure is 4.26 MPa.

== Plastic crystallinity ==
The high temperature α phase is known as a plastic crystal phase. Roughly speaking, the CBr_{4} are situated on the corners of the cubic unit cell as well as on the centers of its faces in an fcc arrangement. It was thought in the past that the molecules could rotate more or less freely (a "rotor phase"), so that on a time average they would look like spheres. Recent work has shown, however, that the molecules are restricted to only 6 possible orientations (Frenkel disorder). Moreover, they cannot take these orientations entirely independently from each other because in some cases the bromine atoms of neighboring molecules would point at each other leading to impossibly short distances. This rules out certain orientational combinations when two neighbor molecules are considered. Even for the remaining combinations displacive changes occur that better accommodate neighbor to neighbor distances. The combination of censored Frenkel disorder and displacive disorder implies a considerable amount of disorder inside the crystal which leads to highly structured sheets of diffuse scattered intensity in X-ray diffraction. In fact, it is the structure in the diffuse intensity that provides the information about the details of the structure.

== Chemical reactions ==
In combination with triphenylphosphine, CBr_{4} is used in the Appel reaction which converts alcohols to alkyl bromides. Similarly, CBr_{4} is used in combination with triphenylphosphine in the first step of the Corey–Fuchs reaction, which converts aldehydes into terminal alkynes. It is significantly less stable than lighter tetrahalomethanes. It is made via bromination of methane using HBr or Br_{2}. It can be also prepared by more economical reaction of tetrachloromethane with aluminium bromide at 100 °C.

== Uses ==
It is used as a solvent for greases, waxes, and oils, in plastic and rubber industry for blowing and vulcanization, further for polymerization, as a sedative and as an intermediate in manufacturing agrochemicals. Due to its non-flammability it is used as an ingredient in fire-resistant chemicals.
