= Potassium tetraiodomercurate(II) =

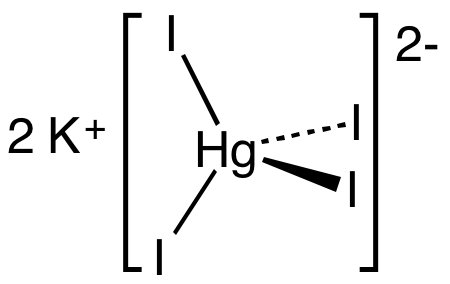

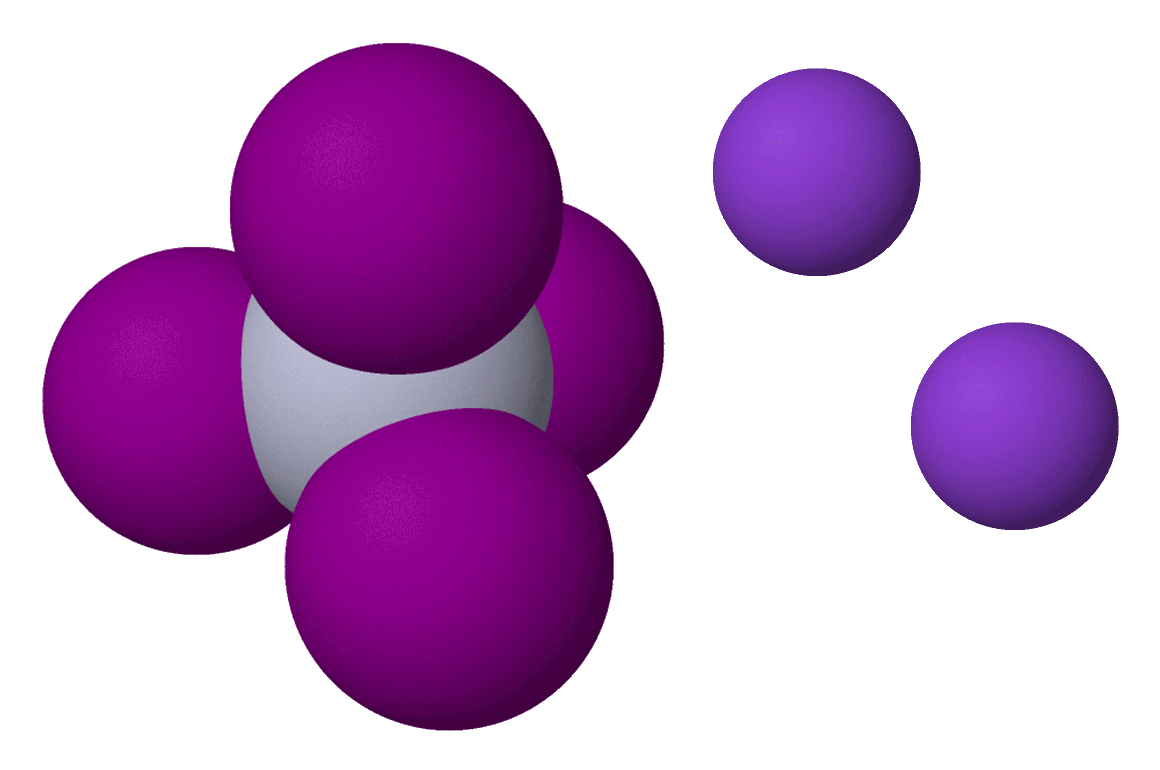

Names
- IUPAC name potassium tetraiodidomercurate(II)
- Other names potassium mercuric iodide, Nessler's reagent (principal component)

Identifiers
CAS Number	7783-33-7
3D model (JSmol)	Interactive image
ChEBI	CHEBI:51568
ChemSpider	22948
ECHA InfoCard	100.029.082
EC Number	231-990-4
PubChem CID	15980736
UNII	7N83S6IU0F
UN number	3287
CompTox Dashboard (EPA)	DTXSID30893684
- InChI: InChI=1S/Hg.4HI.2K/h;4*1H;;/q+2;;;;;2*+1/p-4 Key: OPCMAZHMYZRPID-UHFFFAOYSA-J
- SMILES: [K+].[K+].I[Hg-2](I)(I)I

Properties
Chemical formula	K_{2}[HgI_{4}]
Molar mass	786.406 g·mol^{−1}
Appearance	yellow crystals
Odor	odorless
Density	4.29 g/cm^{3}
Solubility in water	very soluble
Solubility	soluble in alcohol, ether, acetone

Hazards
Safety data sheet (SDS)	External MSDS for Nessler's reagent

Related compounds
Other anions	Mercury(II) iodide
- Except where otherwise noted, data are given for materials in their standard state (at 25 °C [77 °F], 100 kPa). verify (what is ?) Infobox references

Potassium tetraiodomercurate(II) is an inorganic compound with the chemical formula K_{2}[HgI_{4}]. It consists of potassium cations and tetraiodomercurate(II) anions. It is the active agent in Nessler's reagent, used for detection of ammonia.

== Preparation ==
The compound crystallizes from a heated solution of mercuric iodide, potassium iodide, and precisely 2% water in acetone. Attempted synthesis in concentrated aqueous solution will give the pale orange monohydrate K[Hg(H_{2}O)I_{3}] instead.

== Applications ==
K_{2}[HgI_{4}] is a precursor to analogous copper and silver salts M_{2}[HgI_{4}] (M=Cu, Ag).

=== Nessler's reagent ===
Nessler's reagent, named after Julius Neßler (Nessler), is a 0.09 mol/L solution of potassium tetraiodomercurate(II) in 2.5 mol/L potassium hydroxide. This pale solution becomes deeper yellow in the presence of ammonia (NH_{3}). At higher concentrations, a brown precipitate derivative of Millon's base (HgO·Hg(NH_{2})Cl) may form. The sensitivity as a spot test is about 0.3 μg NH_{3} in 2 μL.

NH^{+}_{4} + 2 [HgI_{4}]^{2−} + 4 OH^{−} → HgO·Hg(NH_{2})I↓ + 7 I^{−} + 3 H_{2}O

The brown precipitate is not fully characterized and may vary from HgO·Hg(NH_{2})I to 3HgO·Hg(NH_{3})_{2}I_{2}.
