= 1,2-Dibromopropane =

- Skeletal formula of 1,2-dibromopropane with some implicit hydrogens shown

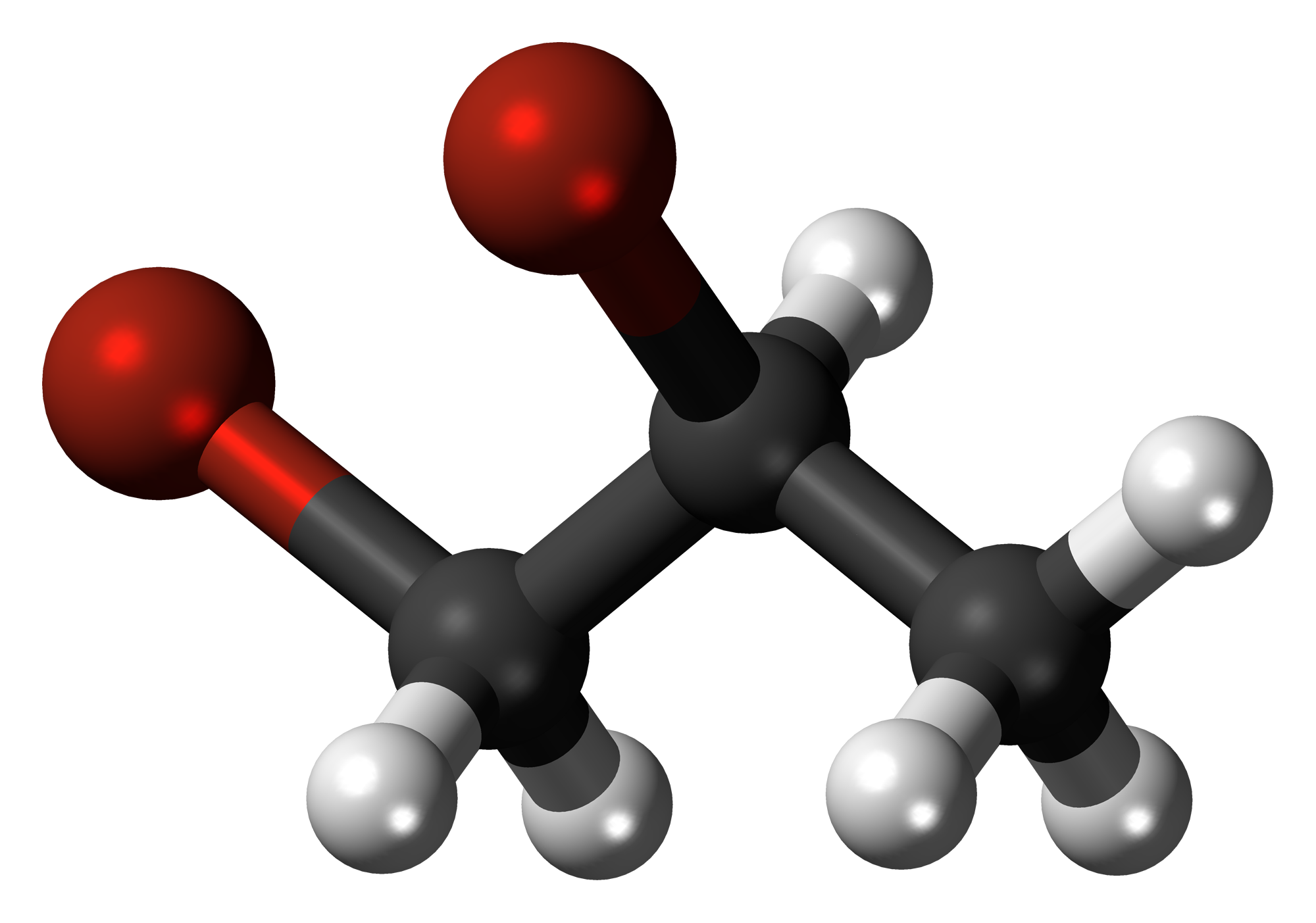

Names
- Preferred IUPAC name 1,2-Dibromopropane
- Other names Propylene dibromide

Identifiers
CAS Number	78-75-1
3D model (JSmol)	Interactive image
Beilstein Reference	1718884
ChemSpider	6305; 557419 S
ECHA InfoCard	100.001.036
EC Number	201-139-1
MeSH	1,2-dibromopropane
PubChem CID	6553; 642201 S
RTECS number	TX8574000
UNII	FGB8O5N903
UN number	1993
CompTox Dashboard (EPA)	DTXSID60870403
- InChI: InChI=1S/C3H6Br2/c1-3(5)2-4/h3H,2H2,1H3 Key: XFNJYAKDBJUJAJ-UHFFFAOYSA-N
- SMILES: CC(Br)CBr

Properties
Chemical formula	C_{3}H_{6}Br_{2}
Molar mass	201.889 g·mol^{−1}
Appearance	Colourless liquid
Density	1.937 g mL^{−1}
Melting point	−55.5 °C; −67.8 °F; 217.7 K
Boiling point	139 to 143 °C; 282 to 289 °F; 412 to 416 K
Henry's law constant (k_{H})	6.7 μmol Pa^{−1} kg^{−1}
Refractive index (n_{D})	1.519

Thermochemistry
Heat capacity (C)	172.8 J K mol^{−1}

Hazards
- GHS labelling
Pictograms	(GHS02: Flammable) (GHS07: Exclamation mark)
Signal word	Warning
Hazard statements	H226, H302, H332
Flash point	50 °C (122 °F; 323 K)
- Lethal dose or concentration (LD, LC)
LD_{50} (median dose)	741 mg kg^{−1} (oral, rat)

Related compounds
Related alkanes	1,1-Dibromoethane; 1,2-Dibromoethane; Tetrabromoethane; 1,3-Dibromopropane; 1,2,3-Tribromopropane
Related compounds	Mitobronitol
- Except where otherwise noted, data are given for materials in their standard state (at 25 °C [77 °F], 100 kPa). verify (what is ?) Infobox references

1,2-Dibromopropane, also known as propylene dibromide, is an organic compound with the formula CH_{3}CHBrCH_{2}Br. It is the simplest chiral hydrocarbon containing two bromine atoms. It is a vicinal dihalide.

(S)-1,2-Dibrompropane (above) and (R)-1,2-Dibrompropane (below)

== Synthesis and reactions ==
1,2-Dibromopropane can be synthesized using electrophilic addition by reacting propene and bromine:

C_{3}H_{6} + Br_{2} → C_{3}H_{6}Br_{2}
