= Enrico Clerici =

Italian mineralogist and geologist

Enrico Clerici (15 October 1862 – 26 August 1938) was an Italian mineralogist and geologist. From 1903 on, he worked at the University of Rome. He published in 1907 the composition of a solution with a density of 4.25 g/cm^{3} at 20°C, to determine the density of minerals. The Clerici solution is a mixture of thallium formate (Tl(CHO_{2})) and thallium malonate (Tl(C_{3}H_{3}O_{4})) in water.
