= Piana Clerico =

- Industry: Clothing
- Founded: 1582
- Headquarters: Chiavazza, 82, 13900 Biella, Italy
- Website: www.pianaclerico1582.com

Piana Clerico is a traditional clothing company in Biella city, Piedmont, Italy, the family business with tradition from 1582.

== The products ==
The products include:

- raincoats
- belts
- waistcoats
- blouses
- pullovers
- jackets
- trousers
- skirts
- t-shirts
- sweaters
- underwear
- socks
- gloves
- ties
- scarves
- hats
- shoes
- slippers, etc.

Well-known products are silk and gold yarn ties.

== See also ==
- Italian fashion
- Made in Italy
