= Colombo Clerici =

Italian lawyer, jurist, author, and community leader

Achille Colombo Clerici
- Occupations: Lawyer; Author

Achille Colombo Clerici is an Italian lawyer, jurist, author, and community leader. He is the president of Assoedilizia, an association of property owners in Milan and vice-president of Confedilizia, an association of Italian property owners.

He received his law degree from Università Cattolica di Milano. He is admitted to practice before the Italian Supreme Court and served as a tax court judge from 1981 to 1994.

== Career ==
Colombo Clerici has been involved with numerous associations and foundations focused on international relations throughout his career. He is the president of Istituto Europa Asia and president emeritus of Istituto Italo Cinese, an institute founded in 1971 by Vittorino Colombo to foster relations between Italy and China. Colombo Clerici is also a co-founder and committee member of Fondazione Carlo Cattaneo, a foundation, which fosters relations between Italy and Switzerland.

He is also involved with property owners’ associations in Italy. He is president of both Assoedilizia, an association of property owners in Milan, and Federlombara Edilizia, an association of property owners in Lombardy. He is also the vice-president of Confedilizia, an association of Italian property owners.

Other positions he holds include the presidency of Amici di Milano, a Milanese civic organisation, and Amici del Grandi Alberghi. He is a former member of the Government Commission for the Control of Lombardy and an adviser to the Catholic Diocese of Milan.

== Bibliography ==
- La Parrocchia nel diritto urbanistico
- Annuario Italiano dell’Edilizia
- Quaderni di Diritto Urbanistico
- La tutela degli Immobili
- Il nuovo Condominio secondo la Riforma
