= Alfonsa Clerici =

Italian religious sister and Blessed

Blessed Alfonsa Clerici SPS

Virgin
- Born: 14 February 1860; Lainate, Milan, Kingdom of Lombardy–Venetia
- Died: 14 January 1930 (aged 69); Vercelli, Kingdom of Italy
- Venerated in: Roman Catholic Church
- Beatified: 23 October 2010, Cathedral of Sant'Eusebio, Vercelli, Italy by Archbishop Angelo Amato
- Feast: 14 January

Alfonsa Clerici (14 February 1860 - 14 January 1930) was an Italian religious sister of the Sisters of the Most Precious Blood, a congregation that was founded by Maria Matilde Bucchi.

Clerici was beatified on 23 October 2010 in Vercelli; Archbishop Angelo Amato presided on the behalf of Pope Benedict XVI, who had approved the beatification the previous July. Alfonsa Clerici is commemorated on 14 January.

== Life ==
Alfonsa Clerici was born on 14 February 1860 near Milan, the eldest of ten children to Angelo and Maria Romano Clerici, four of whom died in infancy. Clerici was baptised on 15 February in the church of San Vittore Martire and received her entrance into the faith from Father Francesco Spreafico.

Two of her brothers, Ildefonso and Prospero, joined the Barnabites, while her sister, Bonaventura, entered the Sisters of the Most Precious Blood in Monza.

In 1875, Alfonsa enrolled at the College of the Precious Blood in Monza. She graduated in 1879 and went on to teach in the Lainate community school for four years. Clerici felt a strong desire to enter the religious life, but decided to postpone plans since she still had to support her parents and her siblings. She pursued her call not long after and joined the sisters at Monza on 15 August 1883, the Feast of the Assumption.

Their apostolate of the Sisters of the Precious Blood is the education of young people. Alfonsa received the habit and commenced her novitiate in August 1884 while making her first vows on 7 September 1886; a few weeks prior to this, her sister made her perpetual vows into the congregation. Clarici served as a teacher at the Monza sisters' college from 1887 to 1889 and was made vice-director on 18 October 1898. The following month, she was appointed director. She also served as secretary and general adviser to the institute.

In 1911, bishop Teodoro Valfré di Bonzo asked Alfonsa to take over management of the lead of the Ritiro della Provvidenza ("House of Providence"), established in Vercelli in 1840 for the education of the girls and daughters of poor families. Clerici relocated to Vercelli on 20 November 1911 and would remain there for the next nineteen years.

Clerici suffered a cerebral haemorrhage on the night of 12–13 January 1930 while in prayer and fell face down on the ground. She died at 1:30 pm on 14 January 1930, one month short of her seventieth birthday. She was buried in Vercelli after a 16 January funeral but was re-interred in Monza on 8 May 1965.

== Beatification ==
The beatification process commenced in the Archdiocese of Vercelli in a process that opened on 13 January 1966 and saw the accumulation of documentation to support Clerici's reputation for holiness. The initial phase concluded on 30 June 1969. On 4 January 1974 she was accorded the title Servant of God. The Congregation for the Causes of Saints accepted the preliminary materials on 18 November 1988.

The positio was submitted to the Congregation for the Causes of Saints in 1992, and Clerici was titled venerable on 22 June 2004 when Pope John Paul II recognised a life of heroic virtue. A miracle was investigated in a diocesan process that opened on 16 February 2004 and closed on 24 June 2004. The Congregation validated it on 5 November 2004 and passed it onto a medical board that approved the healing on 27 November 2008. The miracle in question involved the healing of the near-fatal heart condition of Nedo Frosini after his wife Carla Demi Frosini turned to the intercession of the late religious. Consulting theologians also approved the healing on 22 April 2009, while the Congregation itself followed suit on 13 April 2010. With the recognition of the miracle on 1 July 2010, Pope Benedict XVI approved the beatification to take place. Angelo Amato, Pro-Prefect of the Congregation for the Causes of Saints, presided over the beatification on the pope's behalf on 23 October 2010. The postulator assigned to the cause is Santina Dino.
