= Roberto Clerici the Younger =

Italian painter (fl. 1711–1748)

Roberto Clerici the Younger (Parma, active 1711–1748) was an Italian painter and scenic designer of the Baroque, active in Parma, Vienna, Venice, Naples, Paris, and London. His father of the same name was also a painter, and sources often confuse the two. He was a collaborator and follower of Francesco and Ferdinando Galli Bibiena.

In 1711, he was a scenic designer in Vienna for the court. He then worked at the Teatro San Cassiano in Venice for the operas Le gare generose (1712) by Albinoni and Zaniboni; and for La verità nell'inganno (1713) by Gasparini and Silvani. He prepared scenography and was the engineer for performances in Naples, including L'Amor generoso (1714) at the court theater attributed to Scarlatti. In 1714 for the Teatro San Bartolomeo in Naples, he produced scenography for Scipione nella Spagna also by Scarlatti; Pisistrato by Leonardo Leo; Vincislao by Mancini and Apostolo Zeno; Arminio by Scarlatti and Nicola Serino; and Tigrane ovvero L'egual impegno d'amore e di fede, by Scarlatti and Domenico Lolli.

In 1716–1719, he worked in England: initially at the King's Theatre, and after 1719 as a decorator and machinist at the Royal Academy of Music. He was in Portugal from 1735 to 1738, in Paris in 1740, working with the Comédie-Française. Back in Parma in 1739, he was last documented as a scenographer in 1748.
