= Tetrabromoethane =

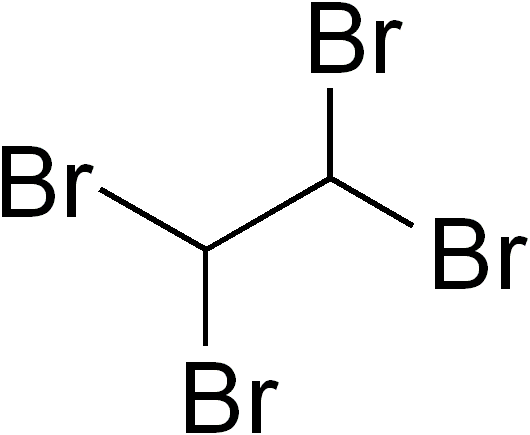
- Seletal formula of tetrabromoethane

- Stereo, skeletal formula of tetrabromoethane with all explicit hydrogens added

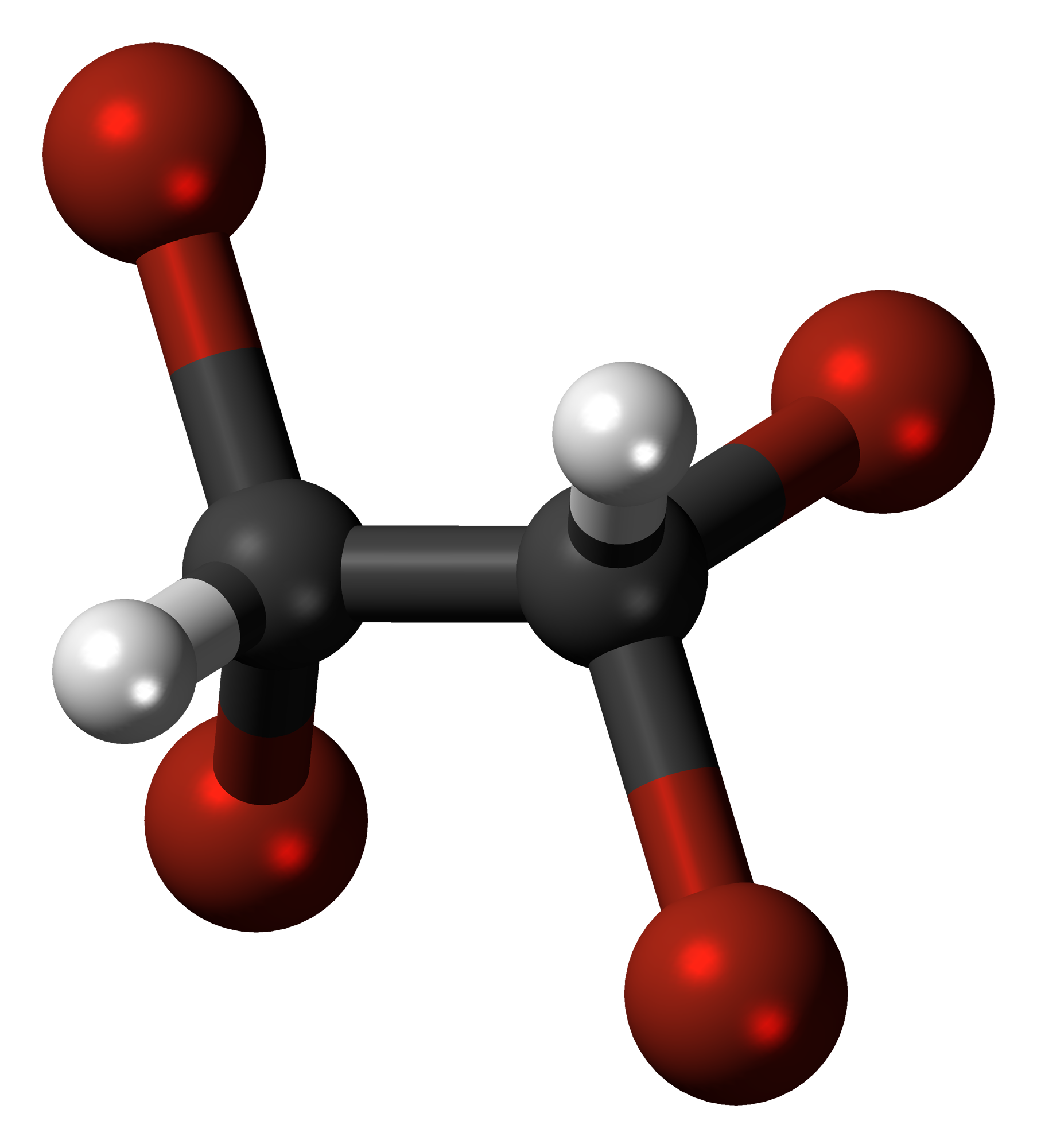
Ball and stick model of tetrabromoethane
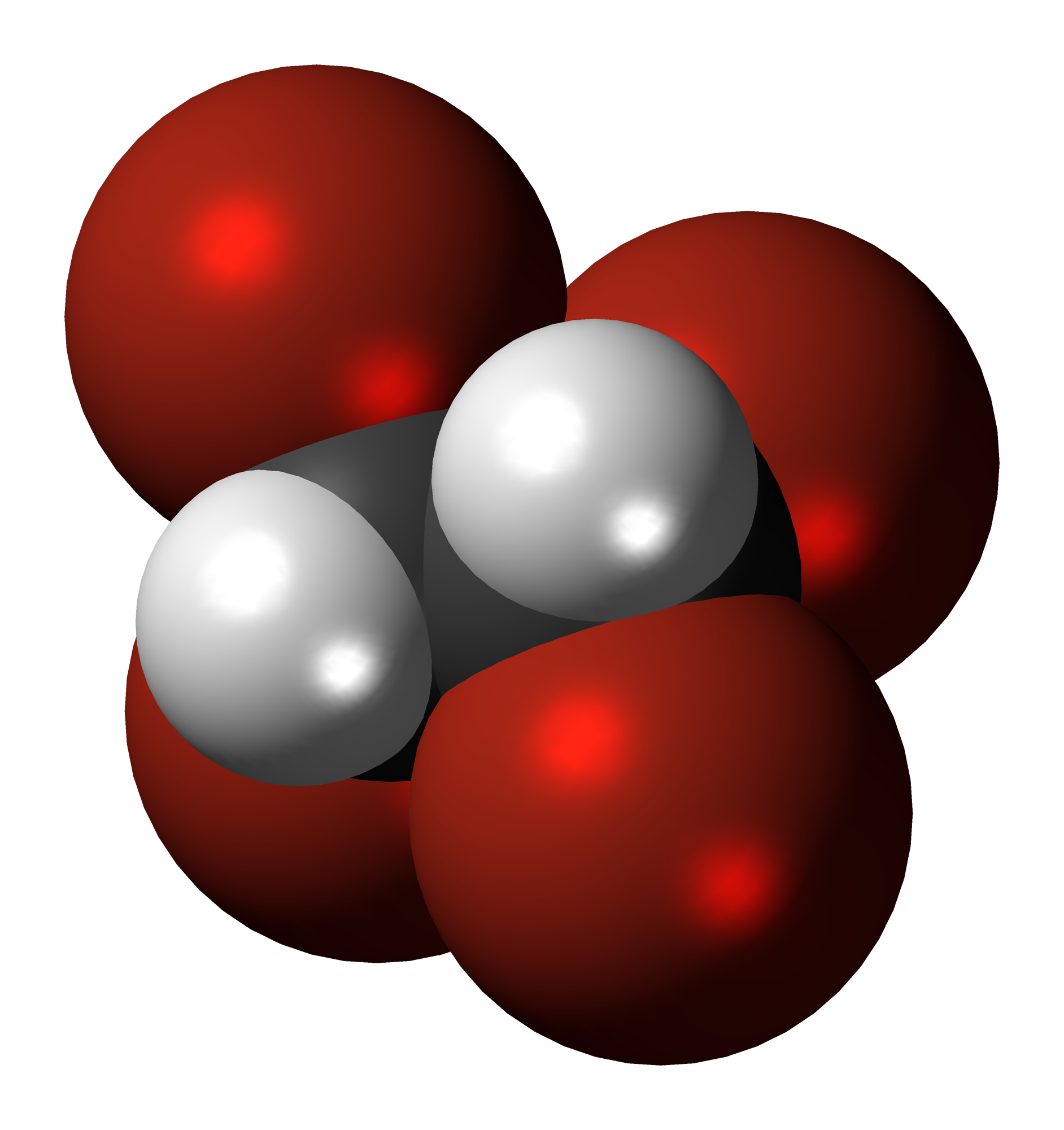
Spacefill model of tetrabromoethane

Names
- Preferred IUPAC name 1,1,2,2-Tetrabromoethane
- Other names: Acetylene tetrabromide; Muthmann's liquid; Tetrabromoacetylene; Symmetrical tetrabromoethane

Identifiers
CAS Number	79-27-6
3D model (JSmol)	Interactive image
Abbreviations	TBE
Beilstein Reference	1098321
ChemSpider	6339
ECHA InfoCard	100.001.083
EC Number	201-191-5
MeSH	1,1,2,2-tetrabromoethane
PubChem CID	6588
RTECS number	KI8225000
UNII	V00GKC584O
UN number	2504
CompTox Dashboard (EPA)	DTXSID1026083
- InChI: InChI=1S/C2H2Br4/c3-1(4)2(5)6/h1-2H Key: QXSZNDIIPUOQMB-UHFFFAOYSA-N
- SMILES: BrC(Br)C(Br)Br

Properties
Chemical formula	C_{2}H_{2}Br_{4}
Molar mass	345.654 g·mol^{−1}
Appearance	Colourless liquid
Density	2.967 g mL^{−1}
Melting point	−1.0 °C; 30.3 °F; 272.2 K
Boiling point	243.6 °C; 470.4 °F; 516.7 K
Solubility in water	630 mg L^{−1} (at 20 °C)
Vapor pressure	10 Pa (at 20 °C)
Magnetic susceptibility (χ)	−123.4·10^{−6} cm^{3}/mol
Refractive index (n_{D})	1.637

Thermochemistry
Heat capacity (C)	165.7 J K^{−1} mol^{−1}

Hazards
- GHS labelling
Pictograms	(GHS06: Toxic)
Signal word	Danger
Hazard statements	H319, H330, H412
Precautionary statements	P260, P273, P284, P305+P351+P338, P310
NFPA 704 (fire diamond)	3 1 1
Flash point	97 °C (207 °F; 370 K)
Autoignition temperature	335 °C (635 °F; 608 K)
- Lethal dose or concentration (LD, LC)
LD_{50} (median dose)	1.2 g kg^{−1} (oral, rat); 5.25 g kg^{−1} (dermal, rat); 0.4 g/kg (oral, guinea pig); 0.4 g/kg (oral, rabbit); 0.269 g/kg (oral, mouse)
LC_{50} (median concentration)	38 ppm (rat, 4 hr)
- NIOSH (US health exposure limits)
PEL (Permissible)	TWA 1 ppm (14 mg/m^{3})
REL (Recommended)	None established
IDLH (Immediate danger)	8 ppm
Safety data sheet (SDS)	hells-confetti.com

Related compounds
Related alkanes	Dibromomethane; Bromoform; Tetrabromomethane; 1,1-Dibromoethane; 1,2-Dibromoethane; 1,2-Dibromopropane; 1,3-Dibromopropane; 1,2,3-Tribromopropane
- Except where otherwise noted, data are given for materials in their standard state (at 25 °C [77 °F], 100 kPa). verify (what is ?) Infobox references

1,1,2,2-Tetrabromoethane, or simply tetrabromoethane (TBE), is a halogenated hydrocarbon, chemical formula C_{2}H_{2}Br_{4}.

== Uses ==
It has an unusually high density for an organic compound, near 3 g/mL, due largely to the four bromine atoms. TBE is a liquid at room temperature, and is used to separate mineral ores from its supporting rock by means of preferential flotation. Quartz, feldspar, calcite, dolomite and other minerals with low density will float in TBE, while minerals such as sphalerite, galena and pyrite will sink. A related compound, bromoform, is also sometimes used in these applications, however, TBE is more practical because of its wider liquid range and lower vapor pressure.

== Safety ==
Permissible exposure limit is 1 ppm. Cases of acute TBE poisoning are known as well.
