= 1,3-Dibromopropane =

- Skeletal formula of 1,3-dibromopropane

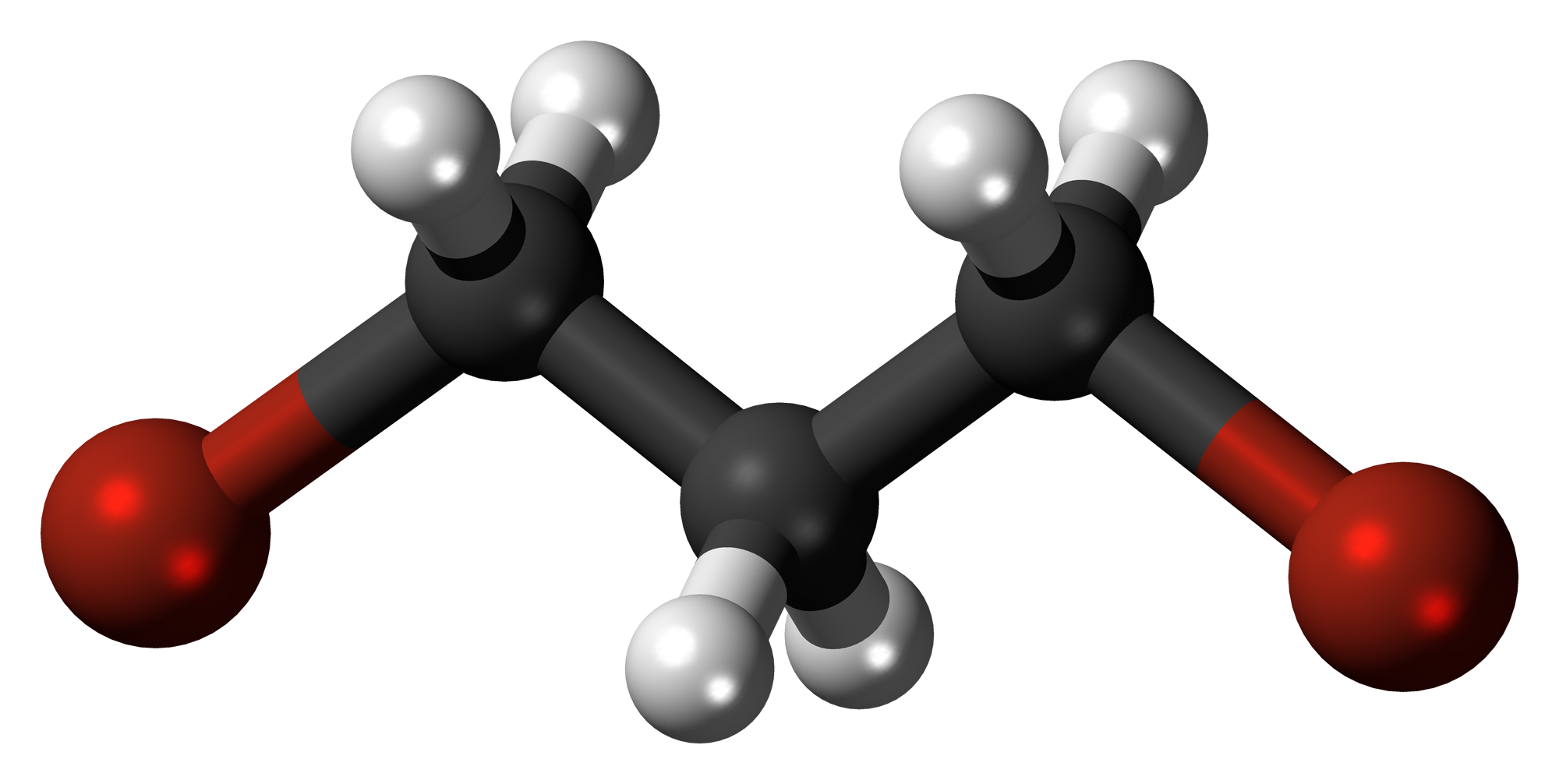
Ball and stick model of 1,3-dibromopropane
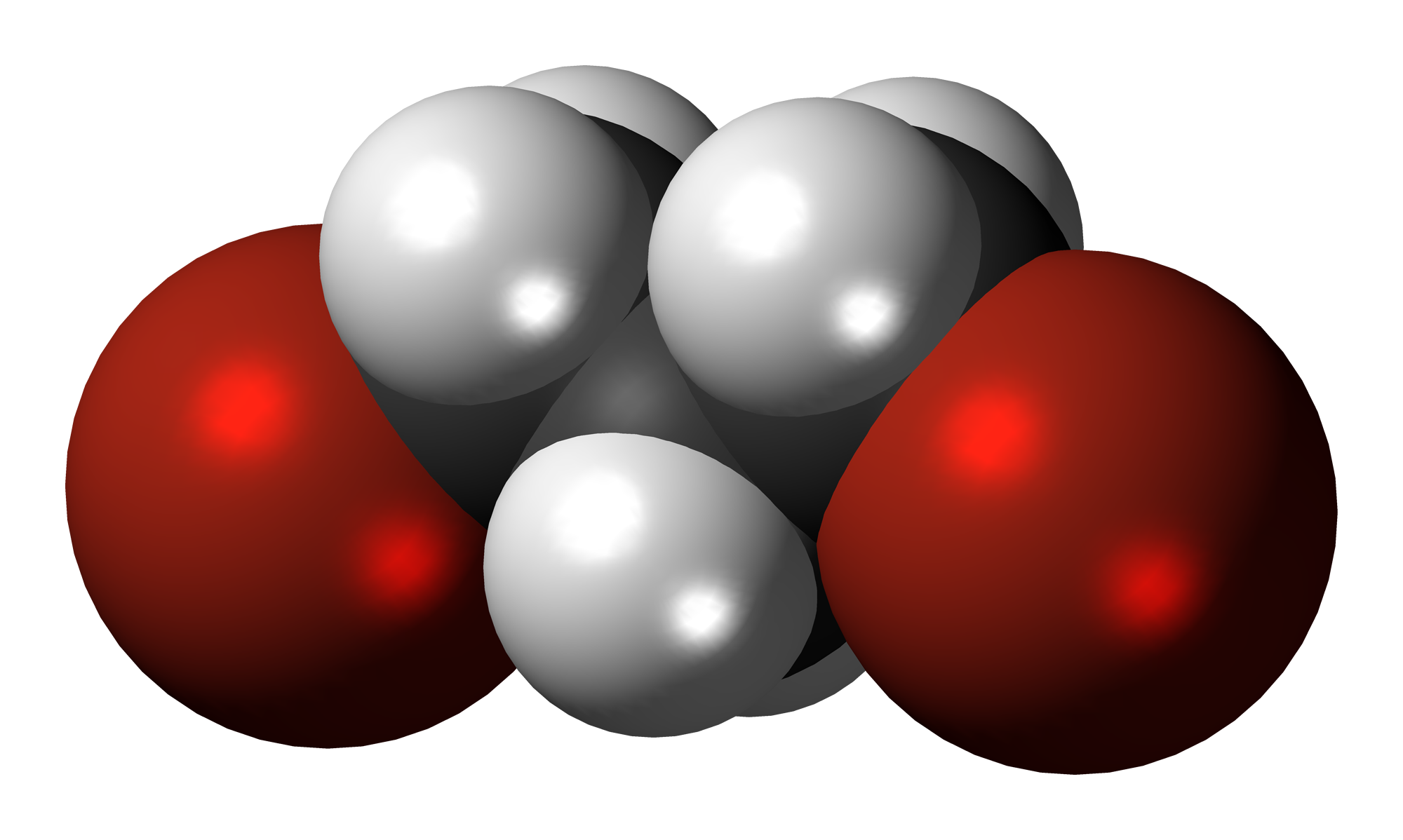
Spacefill model of 1,3-dibromopropane

Names
- Preferred IUPAC name 1,3-Dibromopropane
- Other names: Trimethylenebromide; Trimethylene dibromide

Identifiers
CAS Number	109-64-8
3D model (JSmol)	Interactive image
Beilstein Reference	635662
ChemSpider	7710
ECHA InfoCard	100.003.356
EC Number	203-690-3
MeSH	1,3-dibromopropane
PubChem CID	8001
RTECS number	TX8575000
UNII	YQR3048IX9
UN number	1993
CompTox Dashboard (EPA)	DTXSID1021902
- InChI: InChI=1S/C3H6Br2/c4-2-1-3-5/h1-3H2 Key: VEFLKXRACNJHOV-UHFFFAOYSA-N
- SMILES: BrCCCBr

Properties
Chemical formula	C_{3}H_{6}Br_{2}
Molar mass	201.889 g·mol^{−1}
Appearance	Colorless liquid
Density	1.989 g mL^{−1}
Melting point	−34.20 °C; −29.56 °F; 238.95 K
Boiling point	167 °C; 332 °F; 440 K
Henry's law constant (k_{H})	11 μmol Pa^{−1} kg^{−1}
Refractive index (n_{D})	1.524

Thermochemistry
Heat capacity (C)	163.7 J K mol^{−1}

Hazards
- GHS labelling
Pictograms	(GHS02: Flammable) (GHS07: Exclamation mark) (GHS09: Environmental hazard)
Signal word	Warning
Hazard statements	H226, H302, H315, H411
Precautionary statements	P273
Flash point	56 °C (133 °F; 329 K)
- Lethal dose or concentration (LD, LC)
LD_{50} (median dose)	315 mg kg^{−1} (oral, rat)

Related compounds
Related alkanes	1,1-Dibromoethane; 1,2-Dibromoethane; Tetrabromoethane; 1,2-Dibromopropane; 1,2,3-Tribromopropane
Related compounds	Mitobronitol
- Except where otherwise noted, data are given for materials in their standard state (at 25 °C [77 °F], 100 kPa). verify (what is ?) Infobox references

1,3-Dibromopropane is an organobromine compound with the formula (CH_{2})_{3}Br_{2}. It is a colorless liquid with sweet odor. It is used in organic synthesis to form C_{3}-bridged compounds such as through C-N coupling reactions.

1,3-Dibromopropane was used in the first cyclopropane synthesis in 1881, known as the Freund reaction.

== Synthesis ==
1,3-Dibromopropane can be prepared via the free radical addition between allyl bromide and hydrogen bromide.

== Metabolism ==
Metabolism of 1,3-dibromopropane was examined in 1981. The examination was done by orally administering 1,3-dibromopropane to rats and collecting results 24 hours after administration. Results were obtained from three sources: urine, faeces, and expired air. Upon analysis of the urinary results, researchers discovered the formation of metabolite, N-acetyl-S-(1-bromo-3-propyl)-cysteine and the decline in the GSH content of the liver of the rats. This led to the assumption that 1,3-dibromopropane could have reacted with GSH after administration and gave rise to 1-bromo-3-propyl-S-glutathione, which ultimately form the urinary metabolite. Moreover, due to little radioactivity observed from feces and the confirmation from maintained blood levels of radioactivity proved the occurrence of biliary excretion of sulfur-containing metabolites and enterohepatic cycling.
