= Serena Clerici =

Italian voice actress

- Born: 27 December 1971 (age 54); Rome, Italy
- Occupation: Voice actor

Serena Clerici (born 27 December 1971) is an Italian voice actress. She contributes to voice characters in cartoons, anime, movies, and other contents. Her most known roles are May in Pokémon, Marucho in Bakugan and Dorami in Doraemon.

== Voice work ==
=== Anime & Animation ===
- Dorami in Doraemon
- My Melody in Onegai My Melody
- Baby Hugs & Swift Heart Rabbit in Care Bears
- Amy Rose in Sonic Prime
- Haruka (May) in Pokémon
- Haruka (May) in Pokémon: Jirachi Wish Maker
- Haruka (May) in Pokémon: Destiny Deoxys
- Haruka (May) in Pokémon: Lucario and the Mystery of Mew
- Haruka (May) in Pokémon Ranger and the Temple of the Sea
- Patty in Poppets Town
- Twist in My Little Pony: Friendship Is Magic
- Aiko Senoo in Ojamajo Doremi
- Marucho Marukuro in Bakugan Battle Brawlers
- Marucho Marukuro in Bakugan Battle Brawlers: New Vestroia
- Marucho Marukuro in Bakugan: Gundalian Invaders
- Marucho Marukuro in Bakugan: Mechtanium Surge
- Pip in Yu-Gi-Oh! Zexal
- Ms Tweezer in ChalkZone

=== Video games ===
- Amy Rose in Sonic Generations
