= Bromoform =

Skeletal formula of bromoform
Stereo, skeletal formula of bromoform with the explicit hydrogen added
- Spacefill model of bromoform

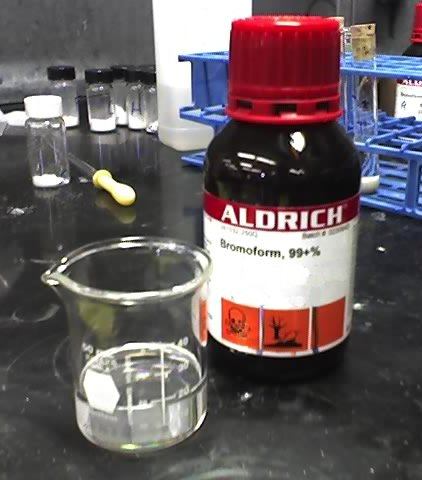
- A bottle of bromoform with some in the adjacent beaker

Names
- Preferred IUPAC name Tribromomethane
- Other names: Bromoform; Methyl tribromide

Identifiers
CAS Number	75-25-2
3D model (JSmol)	Interactive image
Abbreviations	R-20B3; UN 2515
Beilstein Reference	1731048
ChEBI	CHEBI:38682
ChEMBL	ChEMBL345248
ChemSpider	13838404
DrugBank	DB03054
ECHA InfoCard	100.000.777
EC Number	200-854-6
Gmelin Reference	49500
KEGG	C14707
MeSH	bromoform
PubChem CID	5558
RTECS number	PB5600000
UNII	TUT9J99IMU
UN number	2515
CompTox Dashboard (EPA)	DTXSID1021374
- InChI: InChI=1S/CHBr3/c2-1(3)4/h1H Key: DIKBFYAXUHHXCS-UHFFFAOYSA-N
- SMILES: BrC(Br)Br

Properties
Chemical formula	CHBr_{3}
Molar mass	252.731 g·mol^{−1}
Appearance	Colorless liquid
Density	2.89 g/cm^{3}
Melting point	8.69 °C; 47.64 °F; 281.84 K
Boiling point	149.40 °C; 300.92 °F; 422.55 K
Solubility in water	3.2 g L^{−1} (at 30 °C)
log P	2.435
Vapor pressure	670 Pa (at 20.0 °C)
Henry's law constant (k_{H})	17 μmol Pa^{−1} kg^{−1}
Acidity (pK_{a})	13.7
UV-vis (λ_{max})	223 nm
Magnetic susceptibility (χ)	−82.60·10^{−6} cm^{3}/mol
Refractive index (n_{D})	1.595

Thermochemistry
Heat capacity (C)	130.5 J K^{−1} mol^{−1}
Std enthalpy of formation (Δ_{f}H^{⦵}_{298})	6.1–12.7 kJ mol^{−1}
Std enthalpy of combustion (Δ_{c}H^{⦵}_{298})	−549.1–−542.5 kJ mol^{−1}
Enthalpy of fusion (Δ_{f}H^{⦵}_{fus})	11.046 kJ/mol
Enthalpy of vaporization (Δ_{f}H_{vap})	46.06 kJ/mol

Hazards
- GHS labelling
Pictograms	(GHS06: Toxic) (GHS09: Environmental hazard)
Signal word	Danger
Hazard statements	H302, H315, H319, H331, H411
Precautionary statements	P261, P273, P305+P351+P338, P311
NFPA 704 (fire diamond)	3 0 0
- Lethal dose or concentration (LD, LC)
LD_{50} (median dose)	933.0 mg/kg (oral, rat)
LD_{Lo} (lowest published)	1400 mg/kg (mouse, oral); 1147 mg/kg (rat, oral)
LC_{50} (median concentration)	1151 ppm (mammal)
LC_{Lo} (lowest published)	4282 ppm (rat, 4 hr); 7000 ppm (dog, 1 hr)
- NIOSH (US health exposure limits)
PEL (Permissible)	TWA 0.5 ppm (5 mg/m^{3}) [skin]
REL (Recommended)	TWA 0.5 ppm (5 mg/m^{3}) [skin]
IDLH (Immediate danger)	850 ppm

Related compounds
Related alkanes	Dibromomethane; Tetrabromomethane; 1,1-Dibromoethane; 1,2-Dibromoethane; Tetrabromoethane

Pharmacology
Legal status	AU: S6 (Poison) / Schedule 4; Appendix E, clause 3; Appendix F, clause 4

Supplementary data page
- Bromoform (data page)
- Except where otherwise noted, data are given for materials in their standard state (at 25 °C [77 °F], 100 kPa). verify (what is ?) Infobox references

Bromoform is an organic compound with the chemical formula CHBr_{3}. It is a colorless liquid at room temperature, with a high refractive index and a very high density. Its sweet odor is similar to that of chloroform. It is one of the four haloforms, the others being fluoroform, chloroform, and iodoform. It is a brominated organic solvent. Currently its main use is as a laboratory reagent. It is very slightly soluble in water (one part bromoform in 800 parts water) and is miscible with alcohol, benzene, chloroform, ether, petroleum ether, acetone and oils.

== Structure ==
The molecule adopts tetrahedral molecular geometry with C_{3v} symmetry.

== Synthesis ==
Bromoform was discovered in 1832 by Löwig who distilled a mixture of bromal and potassium hydroxide, as analogous to preparation of chloroform from chloral.

Bromoform can be prepared by the haloform reaction using acetone and sodium hypobromite, by the electrolysis of potassium bromide in ethanol, or by treating chloroform with aluminium bromide.

== Uses ==
Only small quantities of bromoform are currently produced industrially in the United States. In the past, it was used as a solvent, sedative and flame retardant, but now it is mainly used as a laboratory reagent, for example as an extraction solvent.

Bromoform's high density makes it useful for separation of minerals by density. When two samples are mixed with bromoform and then allowed to settle, the top layer will contain minerals less dense than bromoform, and the bottom layer will contain denser minerals. Slightly less dense minerals can be separated in the same way by mixing the bromoform with a small amount of a less dense and miscible solvent.

Bromoform is known as an inhibitor of methanogenesis and is a common component of seaweed.

Following research by CSIRO and a spin-off company known as FutureFeed, several companies are now growing seaweed, in particular from the genus Asparagopsis, to use as a feed additive for livestock to reduce methane emissions from ruminants.

== Environment and toxicology ==
Natural production of bromoform by phytoplankton and seaweeds in the ocean is thought to be its predominant source in the environment. However, locally significant amounts of bromoform enter the environment formed as disinfection byproducts when bromine is added to drinking water to kill bacteria. It is somewhat soluble in water and readily evaporates into the air. Bromoform is the main trihalomethane produced in beachfront salt water swimming pools with concentrations as high as 1.2 ppm. Concentrations in freshwater pools are 1000 times lower. Occupational skin exposure limits are set at 0.5 ppm.

The substance may be hazardous to the environment, and special attention should be given to aquatic organisms. Its volatility and environmental persistence makes bromoform's release, either as liquid or vapor, strongly inadvisable.

Bromoform can be absorbed into the body by inhalation and through the skin. The substance is irritating to the respiratory tract, the eyes, and the skin, and may cause effects on the central nervous system and liver, resulting in impaired functions. Its LD_{50} is 7.2 mmol/kg in mice, or 1.8 g/kg. The International Agency for Research on Cancer (IARC) concluded that bromoform is not classifiable as to human carcinogenicity. The EPA classified bromoform as a probable human carcinogen.
