= 1,1-Dibromoethane =

Stereo, skeletal formula of 1,1-dibromoethane with all explicit hydrogens added
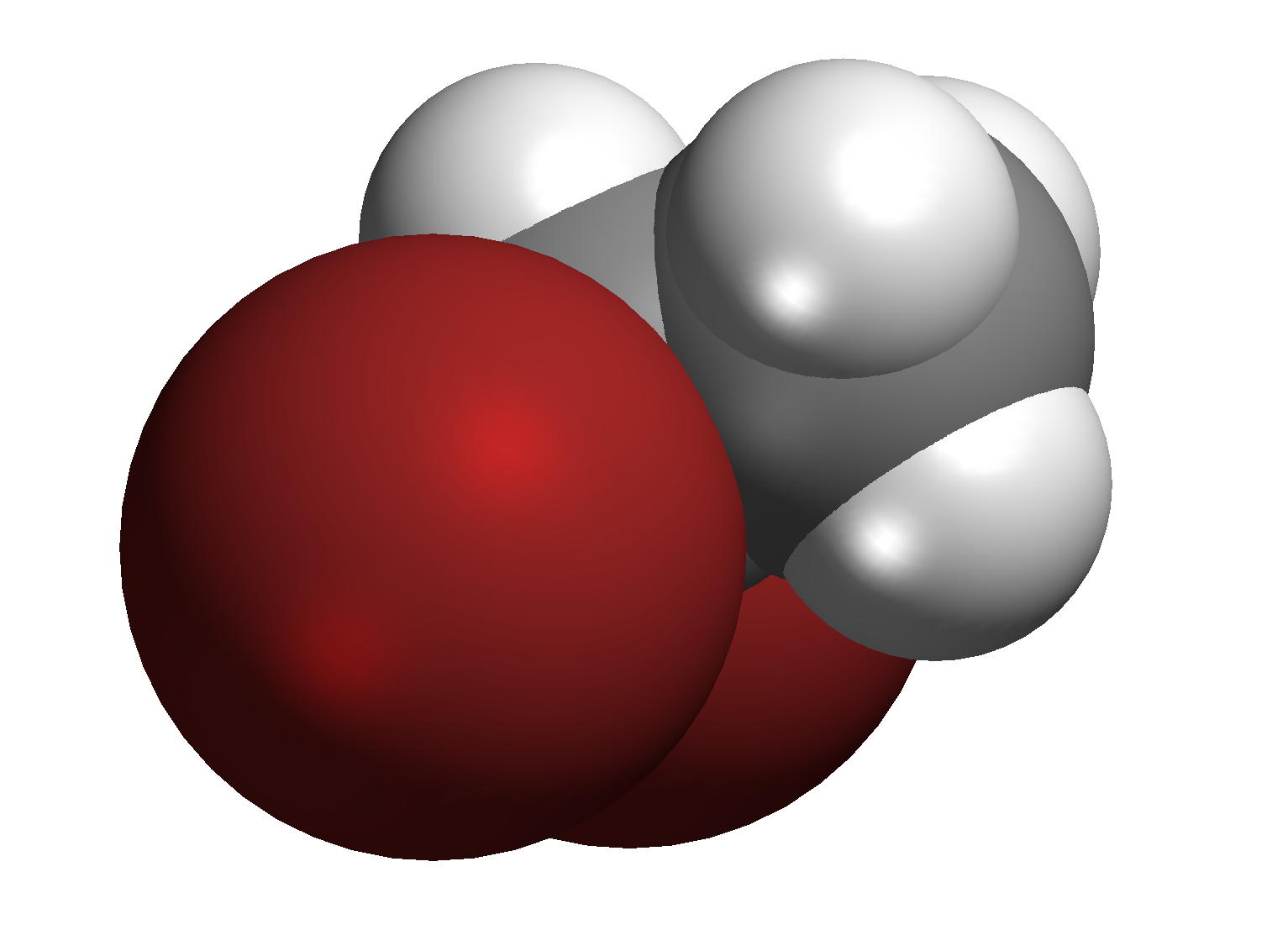
Spacefill model of 1,1-dibromoethane
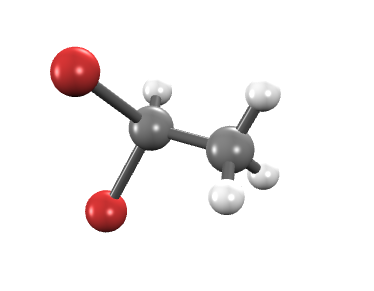
Bond and Stick model of 1,1-dibromoethane
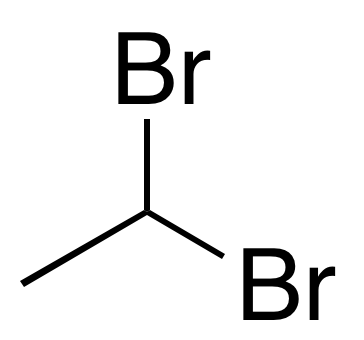
Line model of 1,1-dibromoethane

Names
- Preferred IUPAC name 1,1-Dibromoethane
- Other names Ethylidene bromide, ethylidene dibromide

Identifiers
CAS Number	557-91-5
3D model (JSmol)	Interactive image
ChemSpider	10728
ECHA InfoCard	100.008.351
EC Number	209-184-9
PubChem CID	11201
RTECS number	KH9000000
UNII	KJ8ZJY72QQ
CompTox Dashboard (EPA)	DTXSID3060324
- InChI: InChI=1S/C2H4Br2/c1-2(3)4/h2H,1H3 Key: APQIUTYORBAGEZ-UHFFFAOYSA-N
- SMILES: CC(Br)Br

Properties
Chemical formula	C_{2}H_{4}Br_{2}
Molar mass	187.862 g·mol^{−1}
Appearance	Colorless liquid
Melting point	−63.0 °C; −81.3 °F; 210.2 K
Boiling point	108.1 °C; 226.5 °F; 381.2 K
Solubility in water	3.4 g/L (25 °C)
Solubility	soluble in ether, ethanol, acetone, and benzene slight soluble chloroform
log P	1.9 (estimated)
Refractive index (n_{D})	1.51277 (at 20 °C)

Hazards
- GHS labelling
Signal word	Danger
Hazard statements	H301, H311, H315, H319, H331
Precautionary statements	P261, P264, P270, P271, P280, P311, P312, P321, P322, P330, P361, P362, P363, P405, P501
NFPA 704 (fire diamond)	2 1 0
Flash point	> 93 °C (199 °F; 366 K)
Safety data sheet (SDS)	fishersci.com

Related compounds
Related alkanes	Dibromomethane; Bromoform; Tetrabromomethane; 1,2-Dibromoethane; Tetrabromoethane; 1,2-Dibromopropane; 1,3-Dibromopropane; 1,2,3-Tribromopropane
- Except where otherwise noted, data are given for materials in their standard state (at 25 °C [77 °F], 100 kPa). verify (what is ?) Infobox references

1,1-Dibromoethane is a clear, slightly brown, flammable chemical compound. It is classified as an organobromine compound, and has the chemical formula C_{2}H_{4}Br_{2} and it is a position isomer of 1,2-dibromoethane. It is commonly seen in industrial chemistry, where it is used as a fuel additive. It is also used as a grain and soil fumigant for insect control.

== Synthesis ==
1,1-Dibromoethane is synthesized through addition of hydrogen bromide onto vinyl bromide with absence of peroxide radical.

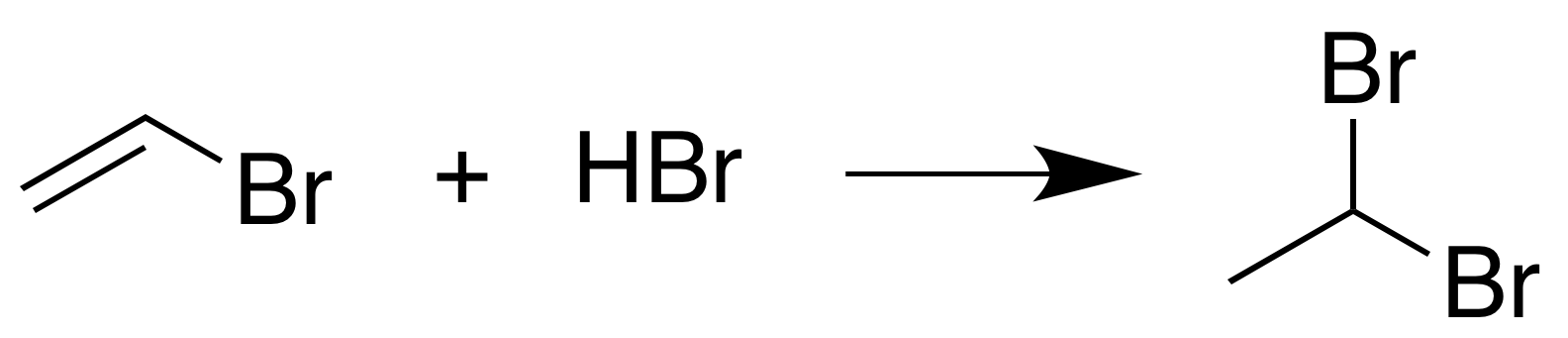

== Safety ==
1,1-Dibromoethane is considered as a mildly toxic compound, especially with bromines attached as substituents. Bromines on the ethane are strong oxidizing agents. If absorbed through inhalation, 1,1-dibromoethane could potentially cause neuronal effects, tissue damage, and bromism.
