= 1,2-Dibromoethylene =

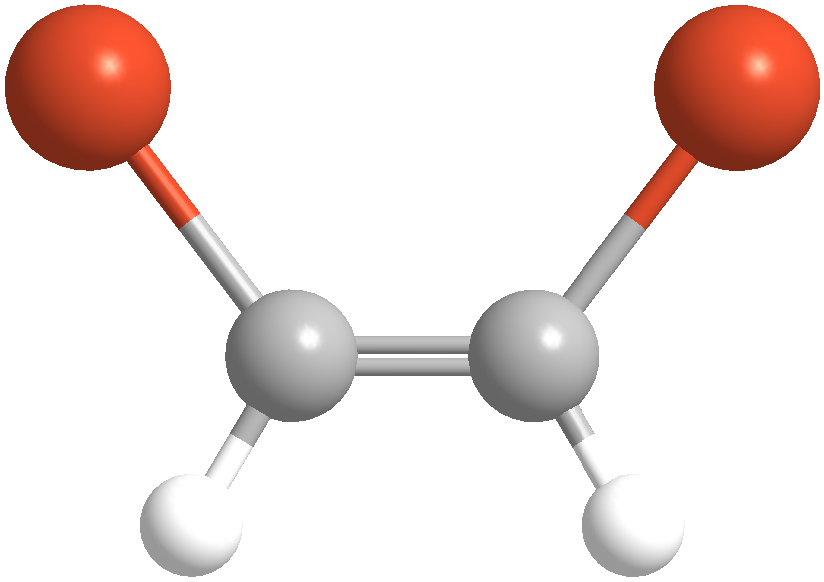
(Z)-1,2-Dibromoethylene
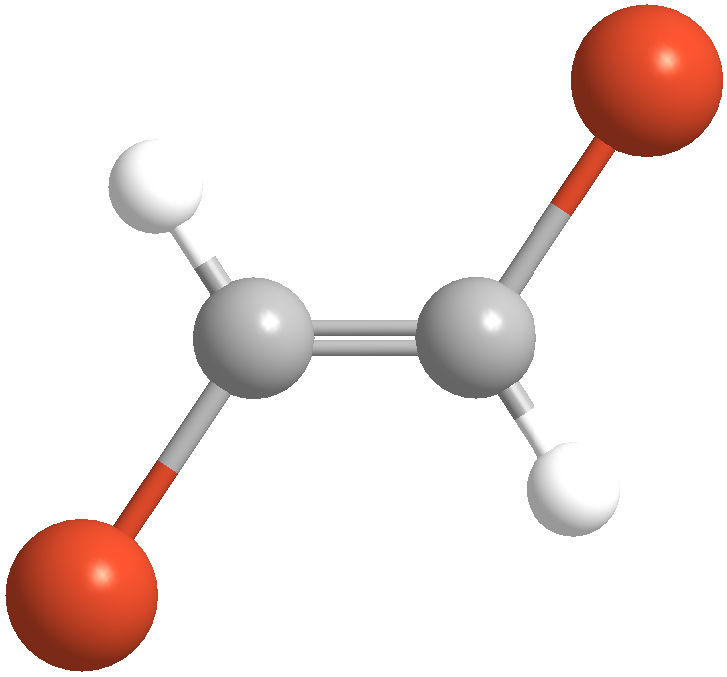
(E)-1,2-Dibromoethylene

Names
- Preferred IUPAC name 1,2-Dibromoethene

Identifiers
CAS Number	590-11-4 (Z); 590-12-5 (E)
3D model (JSmol)	Interactive image
ChemSpider	558875 (Z); 553502 (E)
ECHA InfoCard	100.007.953
EC Number	208-747-6
PubChem CID	643776 (Z); 637929 (E)
UNII	0S4D0712FY (Z); 64UWX7EBVO (E)
CompTox Dashboard (EPA)	DTXSID3060241
- InChI: InChI=1S/C2H2Br2/c3-1-2-4/h1-2H/b2-1+ Key: UWTUEMKLYAGTNQ-OWOJBTEDSA-N
- SMILES: C(=CBr)Br

Properties
Chemical formula	C_{2}H_{2}Br_{2}
Molar mass	185.846 g·mol^{−1}
Appearance	colorless liquid
Density	2.246 g/cm^{3}
Boiling point	110 °C (230 °F; 383 K)

Hazards
- Occupational safety and health (OHS/OSH)
Main hazards	Toxic
- GHS labelling
Pictograms	(GHS06: Toxic)
Signal word	Danger
Hazard statements	H301, H315, H319, H335
Precautionary statements	P261, P264, P270, P301+P310, P302+P352, P305+P351+P338
- Except where otherwise noted, data are given for materials in their standard state (at 25 °C [77 °F], 100 kPa). Infobox references

1,2-Dibromoethylene, also known as 1,2-dibromoethene and acetylene dibromide, is a dihalogenated unsaturated compound with one bromine on each of the two carbon atoms. There are two isomers of this compound, cis and trans. Both isomers are colorless liquids.

== Synthesis ==
1,2-Dibromoethylene can be synthesized by halogenation of acetylene (C_{2}H_{2}) with bromine (Br_{2}). In order to prevent the formation of tetrahalogenated compounds, acetylene is used in excess, with Br_{2} as the limiting reagent.

Alternately, halogenation of this kind could also be achieved through the use of two equivalents of N-bromosuccinimide and lithium bromide (LiBr). N-Bromosuccinimide provides Br^{+} as an electrophile, which is followed by Br^{−} from LiBr.

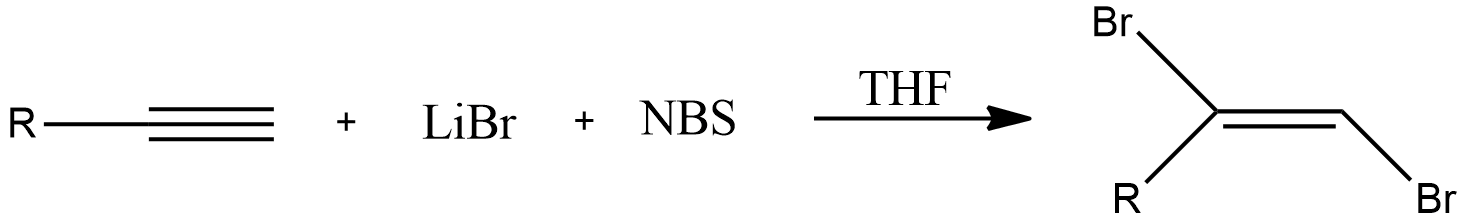
