= Dibromomethane =

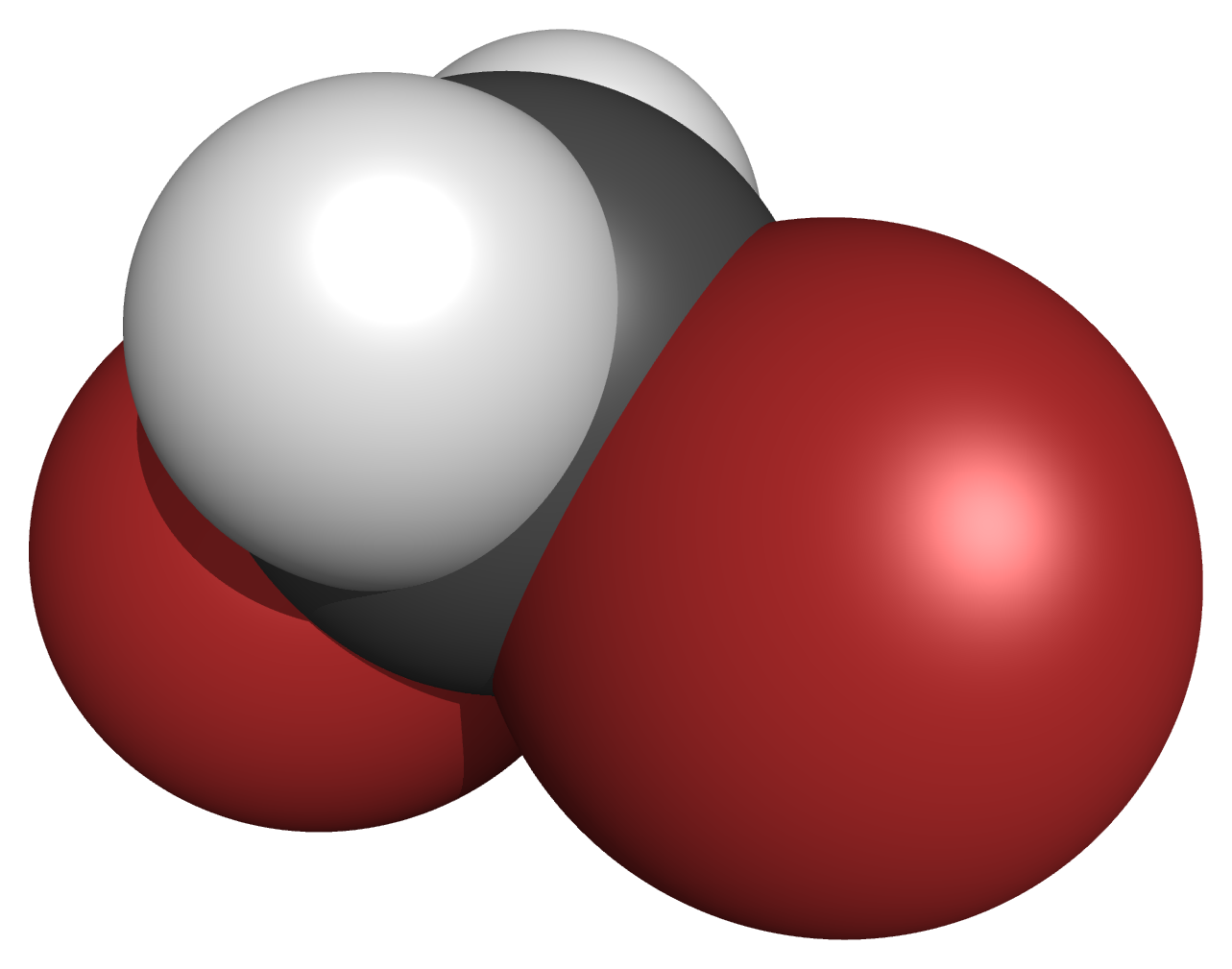
- Spacefill model for dibromomethane

Names
- Preferred IUPAC name Dibromomethane
- Other names: Methyl dibromide; Methylene bromide; Methylene dibromide; Refrigerant-30B2

Identifiers
CAS Number	74-95-3
3D model (JSmol)	Interactive image
Abbreviations	DBM; MDB; UN 2664
Beilstein Reference	969143
ChEBI	CHEBI:47077
ChemSpider	2916
ECHA InfoCard	100.000.750
EC Number	200-824-2
Gmelin Reference	25649
MeSH	methylene+bromide
PubChem CID	3024
RTECS number	PA7350000
UNII	V69B659W01
UN number	2664
CompTox Dashboard (EPA)	DTXSID4021557
- InChI: InChI=1S/CH2Br2/c2-1-3/h1H2 Key: FJBFPHVGVWTDIP-UHFFFAOYSA-N
- SMILES: BrCBr

Properties
Chemical formula	CH_{2}Br_{2}
Molar mass	173.835 g·mol^{−1}
Appearance	Colorless to yellow liquid
Density	2.477 g⋅mL^{−1}
Melting point	−52.70 °C; −62.86 °F; 220.45 K
Boiling point	96 to 98 °C; 205 to 208 °F; 369 to 371 K
Solubility in water	12.5 g⋅L^{−1} (at 20 °C)
Vapor pressure	4.65 kPa (at 20.0 °C)
Henry's law constant (k_{H})	9.3 μmol⋅Pa^{−1}⋅kg^{−1}
Magnetic susceptibility (χ)	−65.10·10^{−6}⋅cm^{3}/mol
Refractive index (n_{D})	1.541

Thermochemistry
Heat capacity (C)	104.1 J⋅K^{−1}⋅mol^{−1}

Hazards
- GHS labelling
Pictograms	(GHS07: Exclamation mark)
Signal word	Warning
Hazard statements	H332, H412
Precautionary statements	P273
NFPA 704 (fire diamond)	2 0 0
- Lethal dose or concentration (LD, LC)
LD_{50} (median dose)	1 g⋅kg^{−1} (oral, rabbit); 3.738 g⋅kg^{−1} (subcutaneous, mouse); >4 g⋅kg^{−1} (dermal, rabbit)

Related compounds
Related alkanes	Bromoform; Tetrabromomethane; 1,1-Dibromoethane; 1,2-Dibromoethane
- Except where otherwise noted, data are given for materials in their standard state (at 25 °C [77 °F], 100 kPa). verify (what is ?) Infobox references

Dibromomethane or methylene bromide, or methylene dibromide is a halomethane with the formula CH_{2}Br_{2}. It is slightly soluble in water but very soluble in organic solvents. It is a colorless liquid.

== Physical properties ==
At ambient temperature, dibromomethane solidifies around 0.61 GPa. The crystal structure strongly suggests both interhalogen and hydrogen-halogen interactions.

== Preparation ==
Dibromomethane is prepared commercially from dichloromethane via bromochloromethane:

6 CH_{2}Cl_{2} + 3 Br_{2} + 2 Al → 6 CH_{2}BrCl + 2 AlCl_{3}
CH_{2}Cl_{2} + HBr → CH_{2}BrCl + HCl

The latter route requires aluminium trichloride as a catalyst. The bromochloromethane product from either reaction can further react in a similar manner:

6 CH_{2}BrCl + 3 Br_{2} + 2 Al → 6 CH_{2}Br_{2} + 2 AlCl_{3}
CH_{2}BrCl + HBr → CH_{2}Br_{2} + HCl

In the laboratory, it is prepared from bromoform using sodium arsenite and sodium hydroxide:

CHBr_{3} + Na_{3}AsO_{3} + NaOH → CH_{2}Br_{2} + Na_{3}AsO_{4} + NaBr

Another way is to prepare it from diiodomethane and bromine.

== Uses ==
Dibromomethane is used as a solvent, gauge fluid, and in organic synthesis (often as ^{1}H-NMR internal standard). It conviently converts polyols (such as catechols) to their methylenedioxy derivatives, and bromomethylenates enolates. It is a much cheaper precursor to a Simmons-Smith-type reagent than diiodomethane.

== Natural occurrence ==
It is naturally produced by marine algae and liberated to the oceans. Releasing on soil causes it to evaporate and leach into the ground. Releasing in water causes it to be lost mainly by volatilisation with a half life of 5.2 hours. It has no significant degradation biological or abiological effects. In the atmosphere it will be lost because of reaction with photochemically produced hydroxyl radicals. The estimated half life of this reaction is 213 days.
