= Clerici solution =

Clerici's solution
Names
- Other names Thallium(I) malonate/formate

Identifiers
CAS Number	61971-47-9
3D model (JSmol)	Interactive image
- SMILES: C(C(=O)[O-])C(=O)[O-].C(=O)[O-].[Tl+].[Tl+].[Tl+].O

Properties
Chemical formula	C_{4}H_{2}O_{6}Tl_{2}
Molar mass	554.82 g/mol
Appearance	Colorless to yellow liquid
Density	4.25 g/mL (20 °C)
Solubility in water	Fully soluble

Hazards
- GHS labelling
Signal word	Danger
Hazard statements	H301, H311, H315, H318, H331, H410
Precautionary statements	P261, P270, P280, P301+P310, P302+P352, P310, P332+P313, P403, P405
- Except where otherwise noted, data are given for materials in their standard state (at 25 °C [77 °F], 100 kPa). Infobox references

Clerici solution is an aqueous solution of equal parts of thallium formate (Tl(HCO_{2})) and thallium malonate (Tl(C_{3}H_{3}O_{4})). It is free-flowing and odorless. Its color fades from yellowish to colorless when diluted. At 4.25 g/cm^{3} at 20 °C (68 °F), saturated Clerici solution is one of the densest aqueous solutions.

== History ==
The solution was invented in 1907 by the Italian chemist Enrico Clerici (1862–1938). Its value in mineralogy and gemology was reported in 1930s.

== Characteristics ==
Saturated Clerici solution is more dense than spinel, garnet, diamond, and corundum, as well as many other minerals. A saturated Clerici solution at 20 °C (68 °F) can separate densities up to 4.2 g/cm^{3}, while a saturated solution at 90 °C (194 °F) can separate densities up to 5.0 g/cm^{3}. The change in density is due to the increased solubility of the heavy thallium salts at the higher temperature. A range of solution densities between 1.0 and 5.0 g/cm^{3} can be achieved by diluting with water. The refractive index shows significant, linear and well reproducible variation with the density; it changes from 1.44 for 2 g/cm^{3} to 1.70 for 4.28 g/cm^{3}. Thus the density can be easily measured by optical techniques.

The color of the Clerici solution changes significantly upon minor dilution. In particular, at room temperature the concentrated solution with the density of 4.25 g/cm^{3} is amber-yellow. However, a minor dilution with water to the density of 4.0 g/cm^{3} makes it as colorless as glass or water (absorption threshold 350 nm).

Procedures for determining mineral density using the Clerici solution are available.

Two substantial drawbacks of the Clerici solution are its high toxicity and corrosiveness. Today sodium polytungstate has been introduced as a replacement, but its solutions do not reach as high a density as the Clerici solution.

== Uses ==
It allows the separation of minerals by density with a traditional flotation method. Its advantages include transparency and an easily controllable density in the range 1–5 g/cm^{3} as a result of changes in solubility (and therefore density of the saturated solution) with temperature.

== Cultural impact ==
Clerici solution was used by the serial killer Tamara Ivanyutina to poison her victims.
