= 1,2-Dibromoethane =

Skeletal formula of 1,2-dibromoethane
Skeletal formula of 1,2-dibromoethane with all explicit hydrogens added
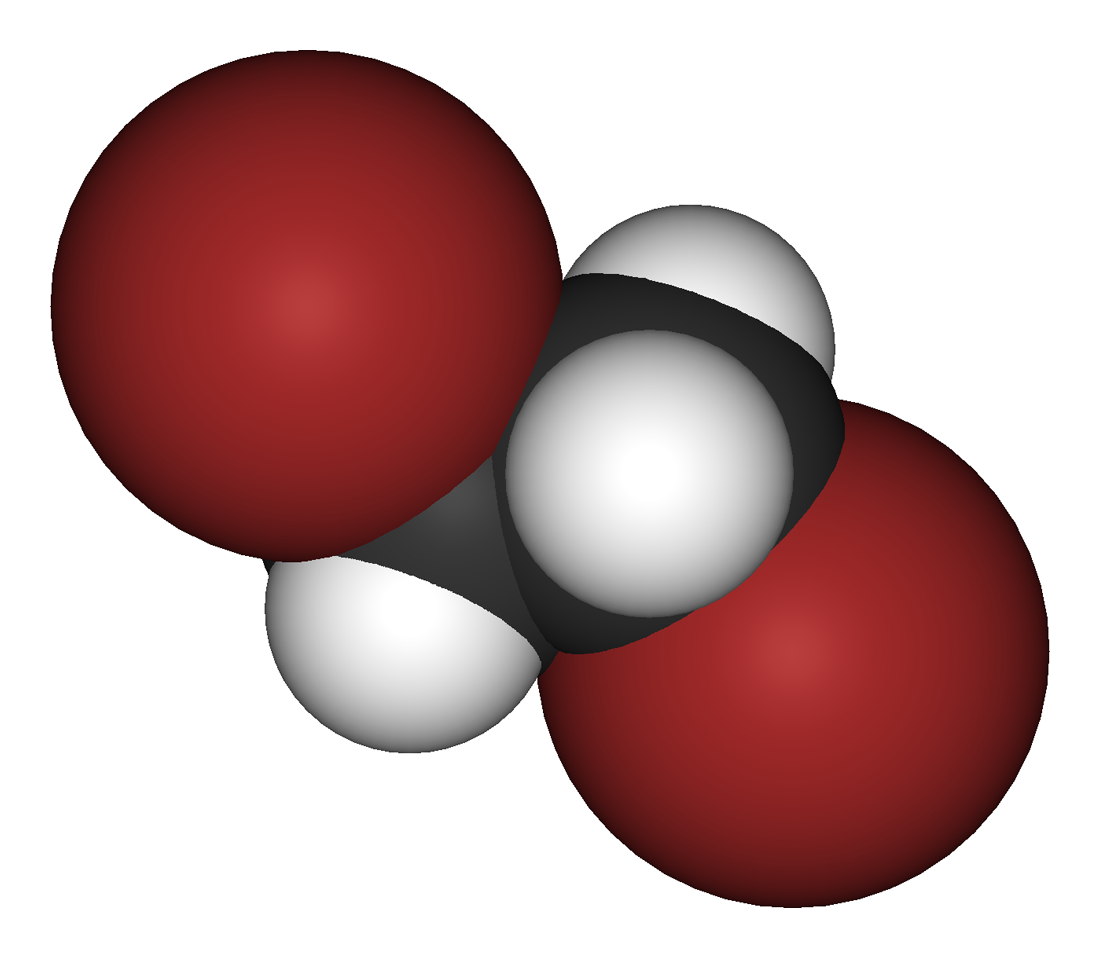
- Spacefill model of 1,2-dibromoethane

Names
- Preferred IUPAC name 1,2-Dibromoethane
- Other names: Ethylene dibromide; Ethylene bromide; Glycol bromide; Di(bromomethyl)

Identifiers
CAS Number	106-93-4
3D model (JSmol)	Interactive image
Abbreviations	EDB
Beilstein Reference	605266
ChEBI	CHEBI:28534
ChEMBL	ChEMBL452370
ChemSpider	7551
ECHA InfoCard	100.003.132
EC Number	203-444-5
KEGG	C11088
MeSH	Ethylene+Dibromide
PubChem CID	7839
RTECS number	KH9275000
UNII	1N41638RNO
UN number	1605
CompTox Dashboard (EPA)	DTXSID3020415
- InChI: InChI=1S/C2H4Br2/c3-1-2-4/h1-2H2 Key: PAAZPARNPHGIKF-UHFFFAOYSA-N
- SMILES: BrCCBr

Properties
Chemical formula	C_{2}H_{4}Br_{2}
Molar mass	187.862 g·mol^{−1}
Appearance	Colorless liquid
Odor	faintly sweet
Density	2.18 g mL^{−1}
Melting point	9.4 to 10.2 °C; 48.8 to 50.3 °F; 282.5 to 283.3 K
Boiling point	129 to 133 °C; 264 to 271 °F; 402 to 406 K
Solubility in water	0.4% (20 °C)
log P	2.024
Vapor pressure	1.56 kPa
Henry's law constant (k_{H})	14 μmol Pa kg^{−1}
Refractive index (n_{D})	1.539

Thermochemistry
Heat capacity (C)	134.7 J K^{−1} mol^{−1}
Std molar entropy (S^{⦵}_{298})	223.30 J K^{−1} mol^{−1}
Std enthalpy of combustion (Δ_{c}H^{⦵}_{298})	−1.2419–−1.2387 MJ mol^{−1}

Hazards
- Occupational safety and health (OHS/OSH)
Main hazards	carcinogen
- GHS labelling
Pictograms	(GHS06: Toxic) (GHS08: Health hazard) (GHS09: Environmental hazard)
Signal word	Danger
Hazard statements	H301, H311, H315, H319, H331, H335, H350, H411
Precautionary statements	P261, P273, P280, P301+P310, P305+P351+P338
NFPA 704 (fire diamond)	3 0 0
Flash point	104 °C (219 °F; 377 K)
- Lethal dose or concentration (LD, LC)
LD_{50} (median dose)	55.0 mg kg^{−1} (oral, rabbit); 79.0 mg kg^{−1} (oral, chicken); 110.0 mg kg^{−1} (oral, guinea pig); 130.0 mg kg^{−1} (oral, quail); 300.0 mg kg^{−1} (dermal, rabbit)
LC_{50} (median concentration)	1831 ppm (rat, 30 min); 691 ppm (rat, 1 hr)
LC_{Lo} (lowest published)	200 ppm (rat, 8 hr); 400 ppm (guinea pig, 3 hr)
- NIOSH (US health exposure limits)
PEL (Permissible)	TWA 20 ppm C 30 ppm 50 ppm [5-minute maximum peak]
REL (Recommended)	Ca TWA 0.045 ppm C 0.13 ppm [15-minute]
IDLH (Immediate danger)	Ca [100 ppm]

Related compounds
Related alkanes	Dibromomethane; Bromoform; Tetrabromomethane; 1,1-Dibromoethane; Tetrabromoethane; 1,2-Dibromopropane; 1,3-Dibromopropane; 1,2,3-Tribromopropane
- Except where otherwise noted, data are given for materials in their standard state (at 25 °C [77 °F], 100 kPa). verify (what is ?) Infobox references

1,2-Dibromoethane, also known as ethylene dibromide (EDB), is an organobromine compound with the chemical formula C_{2}H_{4}Br_{2}. Although trace amounts occur naturally in the ocean, where it is probably formed by algae and kelp, substantial amounts are produced industrially. It is a dense colorless liquid with a faint, sweet odor, detectable at 10 ppm. It is a widely used and sometimes-controversial fumigant. The combustion of 1,2-dibromoethane produces hydrogen bromide gas that is significantly corrosive.

== Preparation and use ==
It is produced by the reaction of ethylene gas with bromine, in a classic halogen addition reaction:

CH_{2}=CH_{2} + Br_{2} → BrCH_{2}–CH_{2}Br

Historically, 1,2-dibromoethane was used as a component in anti-knock additives in leaded fuels. It reacts with lead residues to generate volatile lead bromides, thereby preventing fouling of the engine with lead deposits.

=== Pesticide ===
It has been used as a pesticide in soil and on various crops. The applications were initiated after the forced retirement of 1,2-dibromo-3-chloropropane (DBCP). Most of these uses have been stopped in the U.S. It continues to be used as a fumigant for treatment of logs for termites and beetles, and for control of moths in beehives.

=== Reagent ===
1,2-Dibromoethane has wider applications in the preparation of other organic compounds including those carrying modified diazocine rings and vinyl bromide that is a precursor to some fire retardants.

In organic synthesis, 1,2-dibromoethane is used to brominate carbanions and to activate magnesium for certain Grignard reagents. In the latter process, 1,2-dibromoethane reacts with magnesium, producing ethylene and magnesium bromide, which are innocuous, exposing a more active portion of the magnesium particle to the substrate.

== Health effects ==
1,2-Dibromoethane causes changes in the metabolism and severe destruction of living tissues. The known empirical LD50 values for 1,2-dibromoethane are 140 mg kg^{−1} (oral, rat), and 300.0 mg kg^{−1} (dermal, rabbit). 1,2-Dibromoethane is a known carcinogen, with pre-1977 exposure levels ranking it as the most carcinogenic substance on the HERP Index.

The effects on people of breathing high levels are not known, but animal studies with short-term exposures to high levels caused depression and collapse, indicating effects on the brain. Changes in the brain and behavior were also seen in young rats whose male parents had breathed 1,2-dibromoethane, and birth defects were observed in the young of animals that were exposed while pregnant. 1,2-Dibromoethane is not known to cause birth defects in humans. Swallowing has caused death from ingesting a 4.5 mL dose.
