= Dehalogenase =

A dehalogenase is a type of enzyme that catalyzes the removal of a halogen atom from a substrate.

Examples include:

- Reductive dehalogenases
- 4-chlorobenzoate dehalogenase
- 4-chlorobenzoyl-CoA dehalogenase
- Dichloromethane dehalogenase
- Fluoroacetate dehydrogenase
- Haloacetate dehalogenase
- (R)-2-haloacid dehalogenase
- (S)-2-haloacid dehalogenase
- Haloalkane dehalogenase
- Halohydrin dehalogenase
- Haloacetate dehalogenase
- Tetrachloroethene reductive dehalogenase
