= EC 3.8.1 =

EC 3.8.1 is the Nomenclature Committee of the International Union of Biochemistry and Molecular Biology's (NC-IUBMB) classification for C-Halide compounds.

== List ==
- EC 3.8.1.1 alkylhalidase
- EC 3.8.1.2 (S)-2-haloacid dehalogenase
- EC 3.8.1.3 haloacetate dehalogenase
- EC 3.8.1.4 moved to EC 1.97.1.10
- EC 3.8.1.5 haloalkane dehalogenase
- EC 3.8.1.6 4-chlorobenzoate dehalogenase
- EC 3.8.1.7 4-chlorobenzoyl-CoA dehalogenase
- EC 3.8.1.8 atrazine chlorohydrolase
- EC 3.8.1.9 (R)-2-haloacid dehalogenase
- EC 3.8.1.10 2-haloacid dehalogenase (configuration-inverting)
- EC 3.8.1.11 2-haloacid dehalogenase (configuration-retaining)
