= Halorespiration =

Type of anaerobic respiration

Organohalide respiration (OHR) (previously named halorespiration or dehalorespiration) is the use of halogenated compounds as terminal electron acceptors in anaerobic respiration. Organohalide respiration can play a part in microbial biodegradation. The most common substrates are chlorinated aliphatics (PCE, TCE, chloroform) and chlorinated phenols. Organohalide-respiring bacteria are highly diverse. This trait is found in some Campylobacterota, Thermodesulfobacteriota, Chloroflexota (green nonsulfur bacteria), low G+C gram positive Clostridia, and ultramicrobacteria.

== Process of organohalide respiration ==
The process of organohalide respiration uses reductive dehalogenation to produce energy that can be used by the respiring microorganism to carry out its growth and metabolism. Halogenated organic compounds are used as the terminal electron acceptor, which results in their dehalogenation. Reductive dehalogenation is the process by which this occurs. It involves the reduction of halogenated compounds by removing the halogen substituents, while simultaneously adding electrons to the compound. Hydrogenolysis and vicinal reduction are the two known processes of this mechanism that have been identified. In both processes, the removed halogen substituents are released as anions. Reductive dehalogenation is catalyzed by reductive dehalogenases, which are membrane-associated enzymes. A number of not only membrane-associated but also cytoplasmic hydrogenases, in some cases as part of the protein complexes, are predicted to play roles in the organohalide respiration process. Most of these enzymes contain iron-sulfur (Fe-S) clusters, and a corrinoid cofactor at their active sites. Although the exact mechanism is unknown, research suggests that these two components of the enzyme may be involved in the reduction.

=== Substrates Used and Environmental Significance ===
Common substrates that are used as terminal electron acceptors in organohalide respiration are organochloride pesticides, aryl halides and alkyl solvents. Many of these are persistent pollutants that can only be degraded anaerobically by organohalide respiration, either partially or completely. Trichloroethylene (TCE) and tetrachloroethylene (PCE) are two examples of such pollutants, and their degradation has been a focus of research. PCE is a chlorinated solvent that is widely used in dry cleaning, degreasing machinery and other applications. It remains a common contaminant of groundwater. Bacteria that are capable of completely degrading PCE to ethene, a gaseous chemical, have been isolated. They have been found to belong to the genus Dehalococcoides and to use H_{2} as their electron donor. The process of organohalide respiration has been applied to in situ bioremediation of PCE and TCE in the past. For example, enhanced reductive dechlorination has been used to treat contaminated groundwater by introducing electron donors and dehalorespiring bacteria into the contaminated site, to create conditions that stimulate bacterial growth and organohalide respiration. In enhanced reductive dechlorination, the pollutants act as the electron acceptors and are completely reduced to ultimately produce ethene in a series of reactions.

== Uses in Bioremediation ==
An ecologically significant aspect of bacterial organohalide respiration is the reduction of the two anthropogenic pollutants tetrachloroethylene (PCE) and trichloroethylene (TCE). Their presence as environmental pollutants arose from their common industrial use as metal-degreasing agents from the 1920s–1970. These xenobiotic compounds tend to form partially insoluble layers called dense non-aqueous phase liquids (DNAPLs) at the bottom of groundwater aquifers, which solubilize in a slow, reservoir-like manner, making TCE and PCE among the most common groundwater pollutants.

A commonly used strategy for the removal of TCE and PCE from groundwater is the use of bioremediation via enhanced reductive dechlorination (ERD). ERD involves in situ injections of dehalorespiring bacteria, among fermentable organic substrates serving as electron donors, while the two pollutants, TCE and PCE, act as the electron acceptors. This facilitates the sequential dechlorination of PCE and TCE into noxious cis-1,2-Dichloroethylene (DCE) and Vinyl chloride (VC), which then suit as electron acceptors for the full dechlorination into ethylene.

A wide array of bacteria across different genera have the capacity to partially dechlorinate PCE and TCE into cis-DCE and VC. One such example of this is the Magnetospirillum bacterium, strain MS-1, which can reduce PCE into cis-DCE under aerobic conditions. However, these daughter substrates have higher toxicity profiles than their parent compounds. As such, effective dechlorination of cis-DCE and VC into innocuous ethene is crucial for bioremediation of PCE and TCE-contaminated aquifers. Currently, bacteria of the Dehalococcoides genera are the only known organisms that can fully dechlorinate PCE into ethylene. This is due to their specific transmembrane reductive dehalogenases (RDases) that metabolize the chlorine atoms on the xenobiotic pollutants for cellular energy. In particular, Dehalococcoides isolates VS and BAV1 encode Vinyl Chloride RDases, which metabolize VC into innocuous ethene, making them required species in ERD systems used in bioremediation of PCE and TCE.

== See also ==
- Bioaugmentation
- Reductive dechlorination
- Chloroflexota
- Dehalococcoides
- Dehalobacter
