= Desulfitobacterium hafniense =

Scientific classification
- Domain: Bacteria
- Kingdom: Bacillati
- Phylum: Bacillota
- Class: Clostridia
- Order: Eubacteriales
- Family: Desulfitobacteriaceae
- Genus: Desulfitobacterium
- Species: D. hafniense

Binomial name
- Desulfitobacterium hafniense Christiansen and Ahring 1996

Species of bacterium

Desulfitobacterium hafniense is a species of gram positive bacteria, its type strain is DCB-2^{T}. ( NCBI taxonomy ID 272564; DSM 10664).

Desulfitobacterium hafniense are anaerobic spore-forming bacteria. The majority of the described isolates are facultatively organohalide respiring bacteria capable of reductive dechlorination of organohalides such as chlorophenols, and tetrachloroethene. The cells of D. hafniense are rod-shaped and 3.3 to 6 μm long by 0.6 to 0.7 μm wide, they are motile, each cell having one or two terminal flagella. All tested strains are resistant to the antibiotic vancomycin.

Over the years several additional strains belonging to the hafniense species has been described from a diverse range of environments. Strains PCP-1, TCE1, DP7, TCP-A and G2 were originally published as members of a separate species Frappieri, but all are today considered as belonging to the hafniense species.

D. hafniense isolates
Strain	Source	DSM
DCB-2^{T}	Sewage sludge	10664
PCP-1	Sewage sludge	12420
TCP-A	River sediment	13557
GBFH	River sediment	---
Y51	Polluted soil	---
TCE1	Polluted soil	---
PCE-S	Polluted soil	14645
G2	Subsurface	16228
DP7	Human feces	13498
LBE	not described	---

Genomes

The genome of D. hafniense contains the machinery for both pyrrolysine and selenocysteine, making it the only known organism that potentially utilizes 22 amino acids in protein translation. Desulfitobacterium hafniense strain DCB-2^{T} has a single circular genome that contains 5.78 Mbp encoding 5,045 genes. The genome of Desulfitobacterium hafniense strain DCB-2^{T} harbors seven genes encoding reductive dehalogenases, five of these seems to be functional and two are disrupted by mutations.

Full genome sequence information is available for nine desulfitobacterium hafniense strains. They all have genome sizes ranging from 5 to 5,7 Mbp, none of the sequenced strains contains any plasmids. The genomes encodes only limited numbers of reductive dehalogenases, in addition to genes for utilizing a wide range of electron donors and acceptors.

Strain	Genome size (Mbp)	Number of reductive dehalogenases	Genome described
Y51	5,7	1	2006
DCB-2^{T}	5,3	7	2012
PCE-S	5,7	2	2015
DH	5,4	0	2016
TCE1	5,7	1	2017
PCP-1	5,6	7	2017
LBE	5,5	2	2017
DP7	5,2	0	2017
TCP-A	5	5	2017
