= Desulfitobacterium dehalogenans =

Scientific classification
- Domain: Bacteria
- Kingdom: Bacillati
- Phylum: Bacillota
- Class: Clostridia
- Order: Eubacteriales
- Family: Desulfitobacteriaceae
- Genus: Desulfitobacterium
- Species: D. dehalogenans

Binomial name
- Desulfitobacterium dehalogenans Utkin et al. 1994

Species of bacterium

Desulfitobacterium dehalogenans is a species of bacteria. They are facultative organohalide respiring bacteria capable of reductively dechlorinating chlorophenolic compounds and tetrachloroethene. They are anaerobic, motile, Gram-positive and rod-shaped bacteria capable of utilizing a wide range of electron donors and acceptors. The type strain JW/IU-DC^{T}, DSM 9161, NCBi taxonomy ID 756499.

There are two described isolates from this species strains JW/IU-DC^{T} and PCE1. The genomes of both strains have been sequenced, none of the strains encodes any plasmids, in addition to six reductive dehalogenases, the genomes encodes a large number of genes for utilization of a range of electron donors and acceptors.

Strain	Source	Genome size, Mbp	Number of reductive dehalogenases	DSM
JW/IU-DC^{T}	Freshwater pond	4,3	6	9161
PCE1	Polluted soul	4,2	6	10344
