= Tetrachloroethene reductive dehalogenase =

Trachloroethene reductive dehalogenase

Identifiers
- EC no.: 1.21.99.5

Databases
- IntEnz: IntEnz view
- BRENDA: BRENDA entry
- ExPASy: NiceZyme view
- KEGG: KEGG entry
- MetaCyc: metabolic pathway
- PRIAM: profile
- PDB structures: RCSB PDB PDBe PDBsum
- Gene Ontology: AmiGO / QuickGO
Search
- PMC: articles
- PubMed: articles
- NCBI: proteins

Tetrachloroethene reductive dehalogenase (EC 1.21.99.5, previously 1.97.1.8) is an enzyme that catalyzes some chemical reactions which allow bacteria to metabolise chlorinated hydrocarbons. For example, Dehalobacter restrictus converts tetrachloroethylene to trichloroethylene:

tetrachloroethylene
+ reduced
acceptor
Cl^{−}
trichloroethylene
+ electron
acceptor

The enzyme can also convert trichloroethylene into dichloroethylene and requires an electron acceptor, which is believed to be menaquinone.

This enzyme is an oxidoreductase with systematic name acceptor:trichloroethene oxidoreductase (chlorinating). This enzyme is also called tetrachloroethene reductase. It is one member of a family of enzymes including trichloroethene dehalogenase and vinyl chloride dehalogenase. Reductive dehalogenases are key enzymes for anaerobic respiratory process, termed organohalide respiration, and hence can be used for bioremediation.
