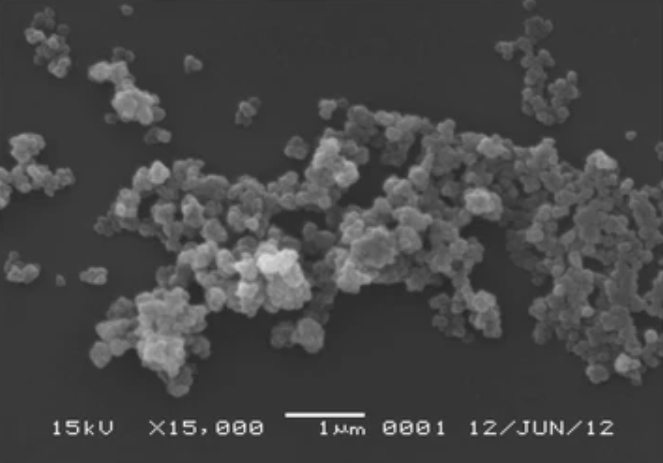
- Dehalococcoides sp. strain UCH00

Scientific classification
- Domain: Bacteria
- Kingdom: Bacillati
- Phylum: Chloroflexota
- Class: Dehalococcoidia
- Order: Dehalococcoidales
- Family: Dehalococcoidaceae
- Genus: Dehalococcoides; Löffler et al. 2013
- Species: D. mccartyi

Binomial name
- Dehalococcoides mccartyi Löffler et al. 2013

Synonyms
- "Dehalococcoides" Maymo-Gatell et al. 1997; "Dehalococcoides ethenogenes" Maymo-Gatell et al. 1997

= Dehalococcoides =

Genus of bacteria

Dehalococcoides is a genus of obligately anaerobic bacteria within the class Dehalococcoidia, currently represented by a single recognized species, Dehalococcoides mccartyi (formerly known as Dehalococcoides ethenogenes). These microbes have an irregular coccus morphology and lack a peptidoglycan cell wall. They can commonly be found in environments lacking oxygen such as, contaminated soil and groundwater. They obtain their energy via the oxidation of hydrogen and subsequent reductive dehalogenation of halogenated organic compounds. Because diverse strains of D. mccartyi have this metabolic characteristic, they are significant in the degradation of pollutants and especially valuable to research because of their potential with bioremediation efforts.

== Morphology and Structure ==
Dehalococcoides mccartyi is a species of small bacteria which have a flat, disc-like shape. They are usually nonmotile and are typically around 0.3-1.0μm wide and 0.1-0.2μm in height. A study of a specific Dehalococcoides strain called MB concluded that these cells are commonly disc-shaped and can occur either alone or in pairs. More recent and detailed imaging of D. mccartyi has shown that these cells can also occur in deformed curved or straight shapes with sharp edges. Earlier studies of D. mccartyi showed evidence of irregular indentations in the surface of cells; however, recent Cryo-electron tomography has not been successful in identifying any similar features to those described by these earlier studies, suggesting that these findings were likely caused by sample handling and preparation procedures.

D. mccartyi has no outer membrane and it does not synthesize peptidoglycan, instead relying on an S–layer directly overlapping the plasma membrane. Rather than occurring in the periplasm, extracellular redox reactions occur in enzyme complexes between the monoderm’s outer leaflet and the S–layer, the pseudo–periplasm. Cryo-electron tomography has also revealed that these cells possess bundled cytoskeletal filaments and short surface appendages that appear to be consistent and connected with their prominent S-layers.

== Genomes ==
Dehalococcoides have a uniquely small genome of about 1.3–1.6 million base pairs as the result of reductive genome evolution. This is one of the smallest values for free-living organisms and is maintained by the reliance on external nutrients to support metabolic necessities. Strains of Dehalococoides possess distinctly large diversity despite the small genome. Strain 195 (Cornell subgroup) was the first sequence published and was categorized by degradation of tetrachloroethene (PCE) and trichloroethene (TCE) to ethene. Other strains such as CBDB1 (Pinellas subgroup) possess the larger genomes of Dehalococcoides—around 1.4-1.5 Mb—and possess a wider array of metabolic function, like the degradation of polychlorinated benzenes and toxins.

Dehalococcoides contain a high abundance of genes encoding reductive dehalogenases, rdhA catalytic subunits and rdhB membrane anchors. Strain specific variation between these dehalogenase enzymes is concentrated in regions of high plasticity around the origin that selectively transcribe different rdhA products based on the present environmental chlorinated electron acceptors. Modern research and bioremediation uses this flexible genome to cvspecific D. mccartyi tailored to the polluted site’s nutrient availability and chlorinated waste product.

== Biochemistry ==
Unlike standard respiring bacteria similar to Dehalococcoides, like Desulfitobacterium and Sulfurospirillum multivorans, D. mccartyi lacks quinones in the cytoplasmic membrane. This absence is attributable to the genomic lack of biosynthetic pathways for menaquinone and ubiquinone: menA–H, mqnA–D, and ubiA–X. Similarly, D. mccartyi lacks the genome clusters for cytochrome biosynthesis (hemA–H). This unique process operates within the atypical monoderm cell envelope.

== Metabolism ==
Dehalococcoides are obligately organohalide-respiring bacteria, meaning that they can only grow by using halogenated compounds as electron acceptors. Currently, hydrogen (H_{2}) is often regarded as the only known electron donor to support growth of Dehalococcoides bacteria. However, studies have shown that using various electron donors such as formate and methyl viologen have also been effective in promoting growth for various species of Dehalococcoides. To perform reductive dehalogenation processes, electrons are transferred from electron donors through dehydrogenases, and ultimately used to reduce halogenated compounds, many of which are human-synthesized chemicals acting as pollutants. Furthermore, it has been shown that most reductive dehalogenase activities lie within the extracellular and membranous components of D. ethenogenes, indicating that dechlorination processes may function semi-independently from intracellular systems. Currently, all known Dehalococcoides strains require acetate for producing cellular material, however, the underlying mechanisms are not well understood as they appear to lack fundamental enzymes that complete biosynthesis cycles found in other organisms.

Dehalococcoides can transform many persistent compounds. This includes tetrachloroethylene (PCE) and trichloroethylene (TCE) which are transformed to ethylene, and chlorinated dioxins, vinyl chloride, benzenes, polychlorinated biphenyls (PCBs), phenols and many other aromatic contaminants.

== Applications ==
=== Microbial Reductive Dechlorination ===
Dehalococcoides have the unique ability to transform many highly toxic and/or persistent compounds, in addition to halogenated compounds that other common organohalide respirators use. They are currently the only known dechlorinating bacteria capable of completely reducing recalcitrant contaminants such as tetrachloroethene (PCE) and Trichloroethylene (TCE) into non-toxic compounds such as ethene. The process of transforming halogenated pollutants to non-halogenated compounds involves different reductive enzymes. The Dehalococcoides sp. strain WL works alongside Dehalobacter in a step-wise manner to degrade vinyl chloride. D. mccartyi strain BAV1 is able to reduce vinyl chloride, a contaminant that usually originates from landfills, to ethene by using a special vinyl chloride reductase thought to be coded for by the bvcA gene. A chlorobenzene reductive dehalogenase has also been identified in the strain CBDB1.

While common compounds such as chlorinated dioxins, benzenes, PCBs, phenols and many other aromatic substrates can be reduced into less harmful chemical forms by other bacteria, mixed cultures can enhance the dehalogenation process by producing metabolic products that can be used by Dehalococcoides and others involved in the degradation process. Also, the addition of electron donors is needed – they are converted to hydrogen in situ by other bacteria present, which can then be used as an electron source by Dehalococcoides. MEAL (a methanol, ethanol, acetate, and lactate mixture) is documented to have been used as substrate.

=== Environmental Remediation Efforts ===
The capacity of Dehalococcoides to grow by using contaminants allows them to proliferate in contaminated soil or groundwater, offering promise for in situ decontamination efforts. For these reasons, several companies worldwide now use Dehalococcoides-containing mixed cultures in commercial remediation efforts. In the US, BAV1 was patented for the in situ reductive dechlorination of vinyl chlorides and dichloroethylenes in 2007. D. mccartyi in high-density dechlorinating bioflocs have also been used in ex situ bioremediation. In 2022, the United States National Aeronautics and Space Administration (NASA) co-funded a US$1.9 million multi-year project with Arizona State University, the University of Arizona, and the Florida Institute of Technology to reduce perchlorates (such as those found in the regolith of Mars) to a useful form of soil for growing plants.

=== Challenges of Bioremediation ===
Although Dehalococcoides have been shown to reduce contaminants such as PCE and TCE, it appears that individual species have various dechlorinating capabilities which contributes to the degree that these compounds are reduced. This could have implications on the effects of bioremediation tactics. For example, particular strains of Dehalococcoides have shown preference to produce more soluble intermediates such as 1,2–dichloroethene isomers and vinyl chloride that are harmful in nature. This runs counter to the goals of Dehalococcoides use during bioremediation . Therefore, an important aspect of current bioremediation tactics involves the use of multiple dechlorinating organisms to promote symbiotic relationships within a mixed culture to ensure complete reduction to ethene.

However, not all members of Dehalococcoides can reduce all halogenated contaminants. Certain strains cannot use PCE or TCE as electron acceptors (e.g. CBDB1) and some cannot use vinyl chloride as an electron acceptor (e.g. FL2). D. mccartyi strains 195 and SFB93 are inhibited by high concentrations of acetylene (which builds up in contaminated groundwater sites as a result of TCE degradation) via changes in gene expression that likely disrupt normal electron transport chain function. Another chemical inhibitor that can occur in contaminated soils is chloroform, which can interfere with reductive dechlorination in certain D. mccartyi strains. However, strain GEO12 exhibits a greater tolerance than other tested strains, highlighting the significance of variation between strains. Even when D. mccartyi strains work well to turn toxic chemicals into harmless ones, treatment times range from months to decades.
