= Narrow-range ethoxylate =

Class of chemical compounds

Narrow-range ethoxylates (NREs) in chemistry are fatty alcohol polyglycol ethers with a narrow homolog distribution and are known nonionic surfactants. They can be produced industrially, for example, by the addition of ethylene oxide onto fatty alcohols in the presence of suitable catalysts (layer compounds which have been calcined or hydrophobized with fatty acids). (Note: Reviews on this subject are presented, for example, by M. Cox in J. Am. Oil Chem. Soc. 67, 599 (1990) and by H. Hensen et al. in Seifen-Ole-Fette-Wachse, 117, 592 (1991).) This process can also be carried out on a variety of other hydrophobes and using different alkoxylating compounds (e.g., propylene oxide and butylene oxide) by modifying the catalyst properties.

== Example ==
An ethoxylation reaction proceeds under an inert atmosphere with an amount of heat depending on the starting material. The reaction proceeds via the epoxide (in this case ethylene oxide) ring opening and activation of the nucleophile, ring, or combination thereof via the catalyst.

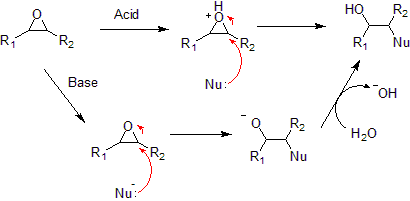

With conventional catalysts (i.e. potassium hydroxide, sodium hydroxide, etc.) one obtains a distribution of ethoxymers. If one targets a 12 mole ethoxylate with a conventional alkaline earth hydroxide, one could expect to get a broad range of ethoxylates with n being anywhere from 3 to 30 moles of EO. With narrow-range catalysts a much tighter distribution can be obtained.

Narrow-range surfactants like alcohol ethoxylates and propoxylates can be incorporated into alkyl ether sulfates or mixed with other anionic surfactants and exhibit beneficial properties such as reduced irritation to skin/eyes and lower free alcohol content.
