= Metallireducens =

Metallireducens may refer to:

- Desulfitobacterium metallireducens, species of bacteria
- Geobacter metallireducens, species of bacteria
- Orenia metallireducens, species of bacteria
