= Tetrachloroethylene (data page) =

Chemical data page

This page provides supplementary chemical data on tetrachloroethylene.

== Material Safety Data Sheet ==
The handling of this chemical may incur notable safety precautions. It is highly recommended that you seek the Material Safety Datasheet (MSDS) for this chemical from a reliable source such as SIRI, and follow its directions. MSDS is available from Fisher Scientific.

== Structure and properties ==
Structure and properties
Index of refraction, n_{D}	1.5055 at 20 °C
Abbe number	38.67
Dielectric constant, ε_{r}	2.5 ε_{0} at 21 °C
Bond strength	78 kcal/mol (C–Cl)
Bond length	1.354 Å (C=C), 1.718 Å (C–Cl)
Bond angle	115.7° (Cl–C–Cl), 122.15° (C=C–Cl)
Magnetic susceptibility	−81.6×10^{−6} cm^{3}/mol
Surface tension	31.74 dyn/cm at 20 °C(C_{2}Cl_{4} against air); 44.4 dyn/cm at 25 °C (C_{2}Cl_{4} against water)
Viscosity	1.1384 mPa·sec at 0.43 °C; 0.8759 mPa·sec at 22.3 °C; 0.6539 mPa·sec at 52.68 °C; 0.4034 mPa·sec at 117.09 °C

== Thermodynamic properties ==
Phase behavior
Triple point	250.81 K (–22.34 °C), ? Pa
Critical point	620 K (347 °C), 4760 kPa
Std enthalpy change of fusion, Δ_{fus}H^{~~o~~}	10.88 kJ/mol
Std entropy change of fusion, Δ_{fus}S^{~~o~~}	43.38 J/(mol·K)
Std enthalpy change of vaporization, Δ_{vap}H^{~~o~~}	34.68 kJ/mol at 121 °C
Std entropy change of vaporization, Δ_{vap}S^{~~o~~}	102.8 J/(mol·K) at 25 °C
Solid properties
Std enthalpy change of formation, Δ_{f}H^{~~o~~}_{solid}	? kJ/mol
Standard molar entropy, S^{~~o~~}_{solid}	? J/(mol K)
Enthalpy of state transition, Δ_{trs}H^{~~o~~}	0.820 kJ/mol (crystal II → crystal I) –148 °C to –63 °C
Entropy of state transition, Δ_{trs}S^{~~o~~}	5.26 J/(mol K) (crystal II → crystal I) –148 °C to –63 °C
Heat capacity, c_{p}	? J/(mol K)
Liquid properties
Std enthalpy change of formation, Δ_{f}H^{~~o~~}_{liquid}	–54.4 kJ/mol	Standard enthalpy of Formation (gas)	-12.4 kJ/mol
Standard molar entropy, S^{~~o~~}_{liquid}	240.6 J/(mol K)
Enthalpy of combustion, Δ_{c}H^{~~o~~}	–830 kJ/mol
Heat capacity, c_{p}	146 J/(mol K) at 25 °C
Gas properties
Std enthalpy change of formation, Δ_{f}H^{~~o~~}_{gas}	–12.43 kJ/mol
Standard molar entropy, S^{~~o~~}_{gas}	343.4 J/(mol K) at 25 °C
Heat capacity, c_{p}	95.51 J/(mol K) at 25 °C

== Vapor pressure of liquid ==
P in mm Hg	1	10	40	100	400	760
T in °C	–20.6_{(s)}	13.8	40.1	61.3	100.0	120.8

Table data obtained from CRC Handbook of Chemistry and Physics 47th ed. Note that "(s)" annotation indicates equilibrium temperature of vapor pressure of solid. Otherwise indication is equilibrium temperature of vapor of liquid.

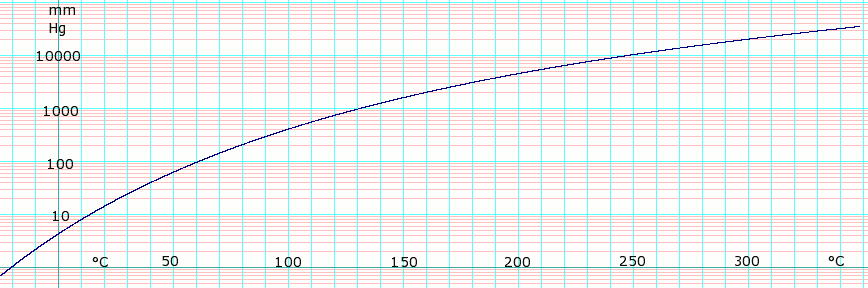
log_{10} of Tetrachloroethylene vapor pressure. Uses formula: $\scriptstyle \log_e P_{mmHg} =$$\scriptstyle \log_e (\frac {760} {101.325}) - 6.665868\log_e(T+273.15) - \frac {6530.97} {T+273.15} + 60.47398 + 3.522382 \times 10^{-6} (T+273.15)^2$ obtained from CHERIC

== Distillation data ==
See also

- Trichloroethylene (data page)

Vapor-Liquid Equilibrium of Tetrachloroethylene/Methanol; P = 760 mm Hg
BP Temp. °C	% by mole methanol
BP Temp. °C	liquid	vapor
117.2	0.1	7.4
113.2	0.3	21.0
107.7	0.3	33.5
102.7	0.3	44.5
97.6	0.8	53.0
93.0	1.1	58.8
87.0	1.7	66.0
80.5	2.4	72.4
70.2	6.6	80.0
65.3	21.5	83.7
64.4	53.3	84.8
63.9	77.6	85.9
63.5	88.3	88.3
63.6	93.7	91.3
63.8	95.0	92.7
64.2	97.9	95.8

Vapor-Liquid Equilibrium of Tetrachloroethylene/1,2-Dichloroethane; P = 760 mm Hg
BP Temp. °C	% by mole dichloroethane
BP Temp. °C	liquid	vapor
117.8	2.0	11.5
114.0	5.0	21.7
110.9	9.2	31.5
108.0	12.0	38.8
106.0	15.0	43.7
103.3	20.0	51.2
100.5	26.4	59.2
98.5	31.1	62.9
95.2	40.0	69.6
93.7	45.0	72.5
92.2	50.0	75.5
89.9	59.4	80.4
88.2	67.9	84.2
86.8	75.0	87.5
85.5	83.8	91.6
84.2	93.8	97.0

Vapor-Liquid Equilibrium of Tetrachloroethylene/Isopropanol; P = 100 kPa
BP Temp. °C	% by mole C_{2}Cl_{4}
BP Temp. °C	liquid	vapor
81.7	0.0	0.0
81.6	0.8	1.2
81.5	1.6	2.3
81.4	3.0	4.1
81.3	5.4	6.7
81.2	8.4	9.4
81.1	12.0	12.1
81.1	16.4	14.5
81.3	21.9	17.1
81.5	27.8	19.0
81.8	33.9	20.3
82.2	39.4	21.5
82.6	44.0	22.6
83.0	50.6	23.1
83.4	55.2	24.2
83.8	60.0	24.7
84.4	65.0	25.3
85.0	69.1	26.2
85.6	75.5	27.7
86.8	79.8	29.6
90.1	87.9	35.3
95.1	92.3	42.7
98.0	94.1	48.2
101.6	95.5	54.0
105.9	97.0	62.6
110.2	98.1	72.1
114.7	99.2	85.0
117.6	99.6	92.1
121.0	100.0	100.0

== Spectral data ==
UV-Vis
λ_{max}	? nm
Extinction coefficient, ε	?
IR
Major absorption bands	? cm^{−1}
NMR
Proton NMR
Carbon-13 NMR
Other NMR data
MS
Masses of main fragments

This box:
- Except where noted otherwise, data relate to Standard temperature and pressure.
- Reliability of data general note.
