= Desulfitobacterium chlororespirans =

Scientific classification
- Domain: Bacteria
- Kingdom: Bacillati
- Phylum: Bacillota
- Class: Clostridia
- Order: Eubacteriales
- Family: Desulfitobacteriaceae
- Genus: Desulfitobacterium
- Species: D. chlororespirans

Binomial name
- Desulfitobacterium chlororespirans Sanford et al. 2001

Species of bacterium

Desulfitobacterium chlororespirans is a Gram-positive, anaerobic, spore-forming species of bacteria. Its type strain is Co23 (= ATCC 700175 = DSM 11544). It grows by coupling the oxidation of lactate to the reductive dechlorination of 3-chloro-4-hydroxybenzoate.
