= Dehalobacter restrictus =

Scientific classification
- Domain: Bacteria
- Kingdom: Bacillati
- Phylum: Bacillota
- Class: Clostridia
- Order: Eubacteriales
- Family: Desulfitobacteriaceae
- Genus: Dehalobacter
- Species: D. restrictus

Binomial name
- Dehalobacter restrictus Holliger et al. 1998

Species of bacterium

Dehalobacter restrictus is a species of bacteria in the phylum Bacillota. It is strictly anaerobic and reductively dechlorinates tetra- and trichloroethene. It does not form spores; it is a small, gram-positive rod with one lateral flagellum. PER-K23 is its type strain.

Its name is Latin for "restricted", referring to the limited substrate range utilized.
