= Pentachloroethane =

Names
- Preferred IUPAC name Pentachloroethane

Identifiers
CAS Number	76-01-7
3D model (JSmol)	Interactive image
ChEBI	CHEBI:76287
ChemSpider	6179
ECHA InfoCard	100.000.842
EC Number	200-925-1
KEGG	C19496
PubChem CID	6419
RTECS number	KI6300000
UNII	QOJ9TH7LDL
UN number	1669
CompTox Dashboard (EPA)	DTXSID7021104
- InChI: InChI=1S/C2HCl5/c3-1(4)2(5,6)7/h1H Key: BNIXVQGCZULYKV-UHFFFAOYSA-N; InChI=1/C2HCl5/c3-1(4)2(5,6)7/h1H Key: BNIXVQGCZULYKV-UHFFFAOYAS
- SMILES: C(C(Cl)(Cl)Cl)(Cl)Cl

Properties
Chemical formula	C_{2}HCl_{5}
Molar mass	202.09 g mol^{−1}
Appearance	Colorless liquid
Odor	Sweetish, chloroform-like
Density	1.68 g cm^{−3}
Melting point	−29 °C (−20 °F; 244 K)
Boiling point	162 °C (324 °F; 435 K)
Solubility in water	0.05% (20°C)
Vapor pressure	3 mmHg (20°C)
Magnetic susceptibility (χ)	−99.1·10^{−6} cm^{3}/mol

Hazards
- GHS labelling
Pictograms	(GHS08: Health hazard) (GHS09: Environmental hazard)
Signal word	Danger
Hazard statements	H351, H372, H411
Precautionary statements	P201, P202, P260, P264, P270, P273, P281, P308+P313, P314, P391, P405, P501
- NIOSH (US health exposure limits)
PEL (Permissible)	none
REL (Recommended)	Handle with care in the workplace
IDLH (Immediate danger)	N.D.
- Except where otherwise noted, data are given for materials in their standard state (at 25 °C [77 °F], 100 kPa). Infobox references

Pentachloroethane is a chemical compound of chlorine, hydrogen, and carbon with the chemical formula C_{2}HCl_{5}. It is a colourless non-flammable liquid that is used as a solvent for oil and grease, in metal cleaning, and in the separation of coal from impurities.

== Production and uses ==
Victor Regnault obtained Pentachloroethane from chlorination of various chlorinated ethanes in 1839.

Pentachloroethane can be obtained by chlorination of trichloroethylene and ethylene-catalysed chlorination of 1,2-dichloroethane. Pentachloroethane can also be obtained by the reaction of acetylene and chlorine, catalysed by aluminium chloride and antimony trichloride. It can be made as a byproduct of tetrachloroethylene production.

Pentachloroethane has limited uses as a solvent for oils and grease (especially in metal cleaning), in soil sterilisation, to remove impurities in coal and as a desiccant agent for wood. It was formerly used as a dry-cleaning solvent for a short time. It is rarely used since there are safer and more economical alternatives such as tetrachloroethylene.

It can be used as a precursor to tetrachloroethylene. Activated carbon-catalysed reaction of pentachloroethane and calcium chloride gives tetrachloroethylene by dehydrochlorination.

== Safety ==
Although it is not flammable, pentachloroethane can oxidise to give phosgene and trichloroacetyl chloride in presence of oxygen at high temperatures. Pentachloroethane is not biodegradable and it can be toxic to aquatic life. It is toxic for humans.
