= Desulfitobacterium =

Scientific classification
- Domain: Bacteria
- Kingdom: Bacillati
- Phylum: Bacillota
- Class: Clostridia
- Order: Eubacteriales
- Family: Desulfitobacteriaceae
- Genus: Desulfitobacterium; Utkin, Woese & Wiegel 1994

Type species
- Desulfitobacterium dehalogenans Utkin, Woese & Wiegel 1994

Species
- D. chlororespirans; D. dehalogenans; "D. dichloroeliminans"; "D. elongatum"; D. hafniense; D. metallireducens; "D. nosdiversum"

Genus of bacteria

Desulfitobacterium is a genus of Gram-positive, strictly anaerobic, rod-shaped, spore-forming bacteria from the family Desulfitobacteriaceae. Desulfitobacterium species have low GC-contents.

== Phylogeny ==
The currently accepted taxonomy is based on the List of Prokaryotic names with Standing in Nomenclature (LPSN) and National Center for Biotechnology Information (NCBI).

16S rRNA based LTP_10_2024

- Desulfitobacterium
  - D. metallireducens
  - - D. chlororespirans
    - - D. dehalogenans
      - D. hafniense

120 marker proteins based GTDB 10-RS226

- Desulfitobacterium
  - D. metallireducens Finneran et al. 2002
  - - "D. dichloroeliminans" De Wildeman et al. 2003
    - - D. dehalogenans Utkin, Woese & Wiegel 1994
      - - D. chlororespirans Sanford et al. 2001
        - D. hafniense Christiansen & Ahring 1996

== See also ==
- List of bacterial orders
- List of bacteria genera
