= In situ bioremediation =

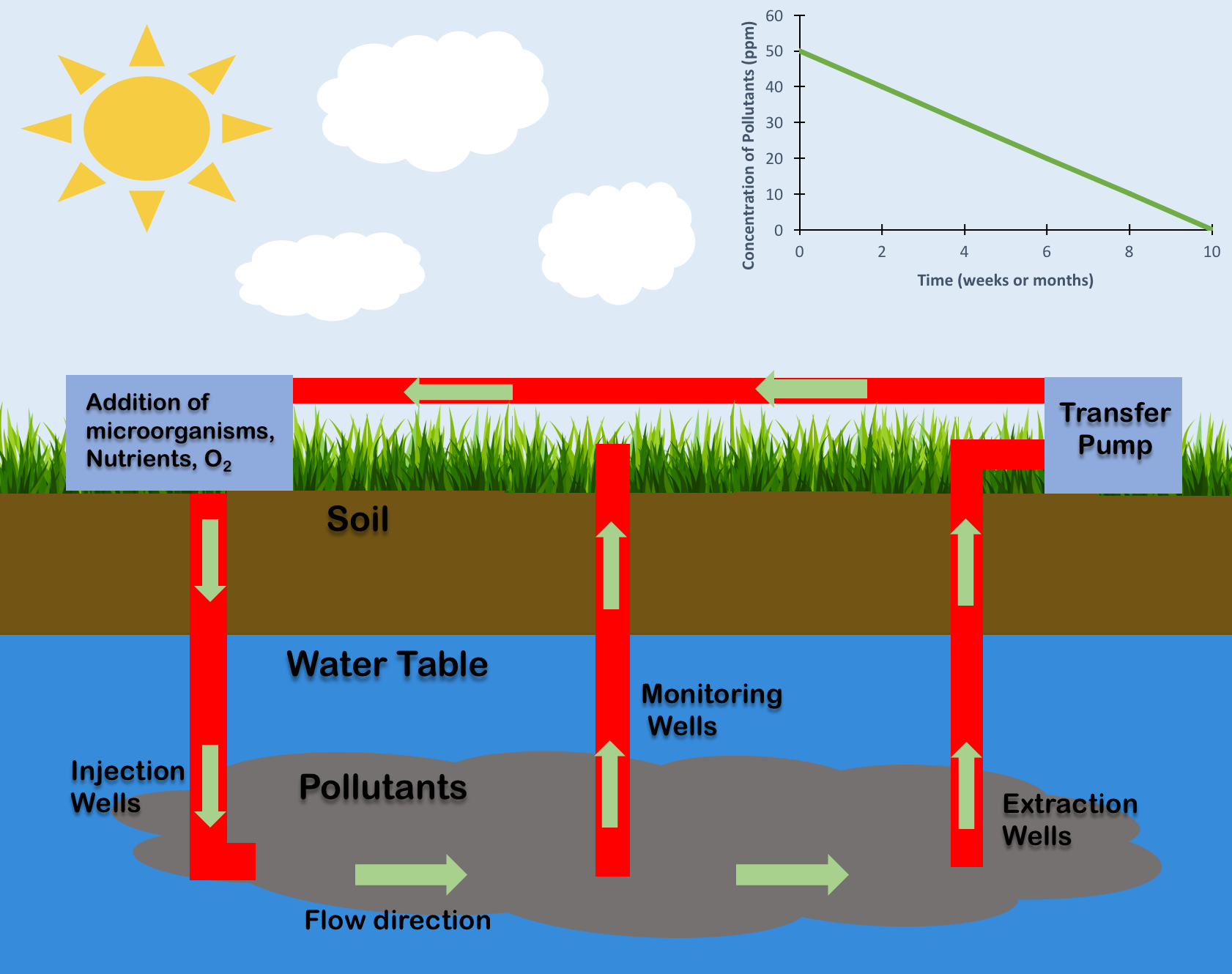
In Situ Bioremediation

Bioremediation is the process of decreasing levels of environmental contaminants in brownfields or superfund sites through either endogenous or external microorganisms. In situ is a term utilized within a variety of fields, meaning "on site" and refers to the location of an event. Within the context of bioremediation, in situ indicates that the location of the bioremediation has occurred at the site of contamination without the translocation of the polluted materials. Bioremediation is used to neutralize pollutants, including Hydrocarbons, chlorinated compounds, nitrates, toxic metals, and other pollutants through a variety of chemical mechanisms. Microorganisms used in the process of bioremediation can either be implanted or cultivated within the site through the application of fertilizers and other nutrients. Common polluted sites targeted by bioremediation are groundwater/aquifers and polluted soils. Aquatic ecosystems affected by oil spills have also shown improvement through the application of bioremediation. The most notable cases are the Deepwater Horizon oil spill in 2010 and the Exxon Valdez oil spill in 1989. Two variations of bioremediation exist, defined by the location where the process occurs. Ex situ bioremediation occurs at a location separate from the contaminated site and involves the translocation of the contaminated material. In situ occurs within the site of contamination In situ bioremediation can further be categorized by the metabolism occurring, aerobic and anaerobic, and by the level of human involvement.

== Definition and history ==
In situ bioremediation is one mechanism of natural attenuation, which is a process of decreasing environmental contaminant concentrations with little to no human intervention. During monitored natural attenuation, the site is monitored in order to track the progress of the bioremediation. Monitored natural attenuation is used in sites where the source of contamination is no longer present, often after other more active types of in situ bioremediation have been conducted.

The Sun Oil pipeline spill in Ambler, Pennsylvania spurred the first commercial usage of in situ bioremediation in 1972 to remove hydrocarbons from contaminated sites. A patent was filed in 1974 by Richard Raymond, Reclamation of Hydrocarbon Contaminated Ground Waters, which provided the basis for the commercialization of in situ bioremediation.

== Classification ==
Accelerated in situ bioremediation is defined as when a specified microorganism is targeted for growth through the application of either nutrients or an electron donor to the contaminated site. Within aerobic metabolism, the nutrient added to the soil can be solely Oxygen. Anaerobic in situ bioremediation often requires a variety of electron donors or acceptors, such as benzoate and lactate. Besides nutrients, microorganisms can also be introduced directly to the site within accelerated in situ bioremediation. The addition of extraneous microorganisms to a site is termed bioaugmentation and is used when a particular microorganism is effective at degrading the pollutant at the site and is not found either naturally or at a high enough population to be effective. Accelerated in situ bioremediation is utilized when the desired population of microorganisms within a site is not naturally present at a sufficient level to effectively degrade the pollutants. It is also used when the required nutrients within the site are either not at a concentration sufficient to support growth or are unavailable.

=== Raymond Process ===
The Raymond Process is a type of accelerated in situ bioremediation that was developed by Richard Raymond and involves the introduction of nutrients and electron acceptors to a contaminated site. This process is primarily used to treat polluted groundwater. In the Raymond process, a loop system is created. Contaminated Groundwater from downstream of the groundwater flow is pumped to the surface and infused with nutrients and an electron donor, often oxygen. This treated water is then pumped back down below the water table upstream of where it was originally taken. This process introduces nutrients and electron donors into the site, allowing for the growth of a determined microbial population.

==== Oxygen injection ====
In contaminated sites where the desired microbial metabolism is aerobic, introducing oxygen to the site can be used to increase the population of targeted microorganisms. The injection of Oxygen can occur through a variety of processes. Oxygen can be injected into the subsurface through injection wells. It can also be introduced through an injection gallery. The presence of oxygen within a site is often the limiting factor when determining the time frame and efficacy of a proposed in situ bioremediation process.

===== Ozone injection =====
Ozone injected into the subsurface introduces oxygen into a contaminated site. Despite being a strong oxidizing agent and potentially having a toxic effect on subsurface microbial populations, ozone can be an efficient means of spreading oxygen throughout a site due to its high solubility. Within twenty minutes after being injected into the subsurface, fifty percent of the ozone will have decomposed to oxygen. Ozone is introduced to the soil in either a dissolved or gaseous state.

==== Anaerobic in situ bioremediation ====
Within accelerated anaerobic in situ bioremediation, electron donors and acceptors are introduced into a contaminated site in order to increase the population of anaerobic microorganisms.

== Uses ==
=== Biochar ===
Hydrocarbons are also commonly known as polycyclic aromatic hydrocarbons (PAHs) that are made up of aromatic rings. These pollutants are the byproducts of the burning of materials such as fossil fuels. Hydrocarbons are found in both terrestrial and aquatic environments, posing a threat to environmental health, biodiversity, and food safety. Hydrocarbons can also exhibit mutagenic and carcinogenic properties, posing a threat to both human and animal life.

Aerobic and anaerobic remediation techniques can be used to degrade these pollutants; an effective anaerobic technique is Biochar. Biochar is composed of plant residues, microbial biomass, and agricultural residues, produced through a process called pyrolysis. It has a porous and absorbent structure and creates optimal conditions for microorganisms to degrade pollutants in the soil. Additionally, Biochar is rich in carbon, which makes the Biochar act as a trap for PAH pollutants. Biochar absorbs the most pollutants when the temperature of pyrolysis is the highest because higher temperatures increase the surface area of the Biochar. To improve the effectiveness of biochar, acid and alkali are often used as activating agents to improve PAH removal. Biochar can be used both in aerobic and anaerobic conditions, but it is ideally used under anaerobic conditions because it creates an environment where microbes can flourish, which enhances the effectiveness of biochar. Byproducts can be used to improve soil quality. Biochar is a component in the creation of biogas, a renewable fuel derived from animal and environmental waste and composed of methane and carbon dioxide. This process occurs in a digester where biochar's porous and absorbent structure fosters an ideal habitat for microorganisms to break down waste. Biochar also leaves behind digestates. Digestates are beneficial for the soil because they can be used to make nutrient-rich fertilizer and conditioner. Digestates may also pose issues; similar to creating beneficial organic matter, it can also leave behind inorganic heavy metals, which are dangerous pollutants.

Hydrocarbons can be classified into two groups: LMW-PAHs, which have a low molecular weight and less than four aromatic rings, and HMW-PAHs with a high molecular weight and more than four aromatic rings. The higher the molecular weight or the aromatic rings of a PAH are, the lower the solubility of the PAH is, which makes it harder to break down pollutants.

=== Hydrocarbons ===
Naturally occurring within the soil are microbial populations that utilize hydrocarbons as a source of energy and carbon. Up to twenty percent of microbial soil populations can metabolize hydrocarbons. These populations can, through either accelerated or naturally monitored attenuation, be utilized to neutralize within the soil hydrocarbon pollutants. The metabolic mode of hydrocarbon remediation is primarily aerobic. The end products of the remediation for hydrocarbons are Carbon Dioxide and water. Hydrocarbons vary in ease of degradation based on their structure. Long-chain aliphatic carbons are the most effectively degraded. Short-chained, branched, and quaternary aliphatic hydrocarbons are less effectively degraded. Alkene degradation is dependent on the saturation of the chain, with saturated alkenes being more readily degraded. Large numbers of microbes with the ability to metabolize aromatic hydrocarbons are present within the soil. Aromatic hydrocarbons are also susceptible to being degraded through anaerobic metabolism. Hydrocarbon metabolism is an important facet of in situ bioremediation due to the severity of petroleum spills around the world. Polynuclear aromatic carbons' susceptibility to degradation is related to the number of aromatic rings within the compound. Compounds with two or three rings are degraded at an effective rate, but compounds possessing four or more rings can be more resilient to bioremediation efforts. Degradation of polynuclear aromatic carbons with less than four rings is accomplished by various aerobic microbes present in the soil. Meanwhile, for larger-molecular-sized compounds, the only metabolic mode that is effective is cometabolism. The fungus genus Phanerochaete, under anaerobic conditions, has species with the ability to metabolize some polynuclear aromatic carbons utilizing a peroxidase enzyme.

=== Chlorinated Compounds ===
==== Chlorinated Aliphatic Compounds ====
A variety of metabolic modes exist capable of degrading chlorinated aliphatic compounds. Anaerobic reduction, oxidation of the compound, and cometabolism under aerobic conditions are the three main metabolic modes utilized by microorganisms to degrade chlorinated aliphatic compounds. Organisms that can readily metabolize chlorinated aliphatic compounds are not common in the environment. One and two-carbon carbons that have little chlorination are the compounds most effectively metabolized by soil microbial populations. The degradation of chlorinated aliphatic compounds is most often performed through cometabolism.

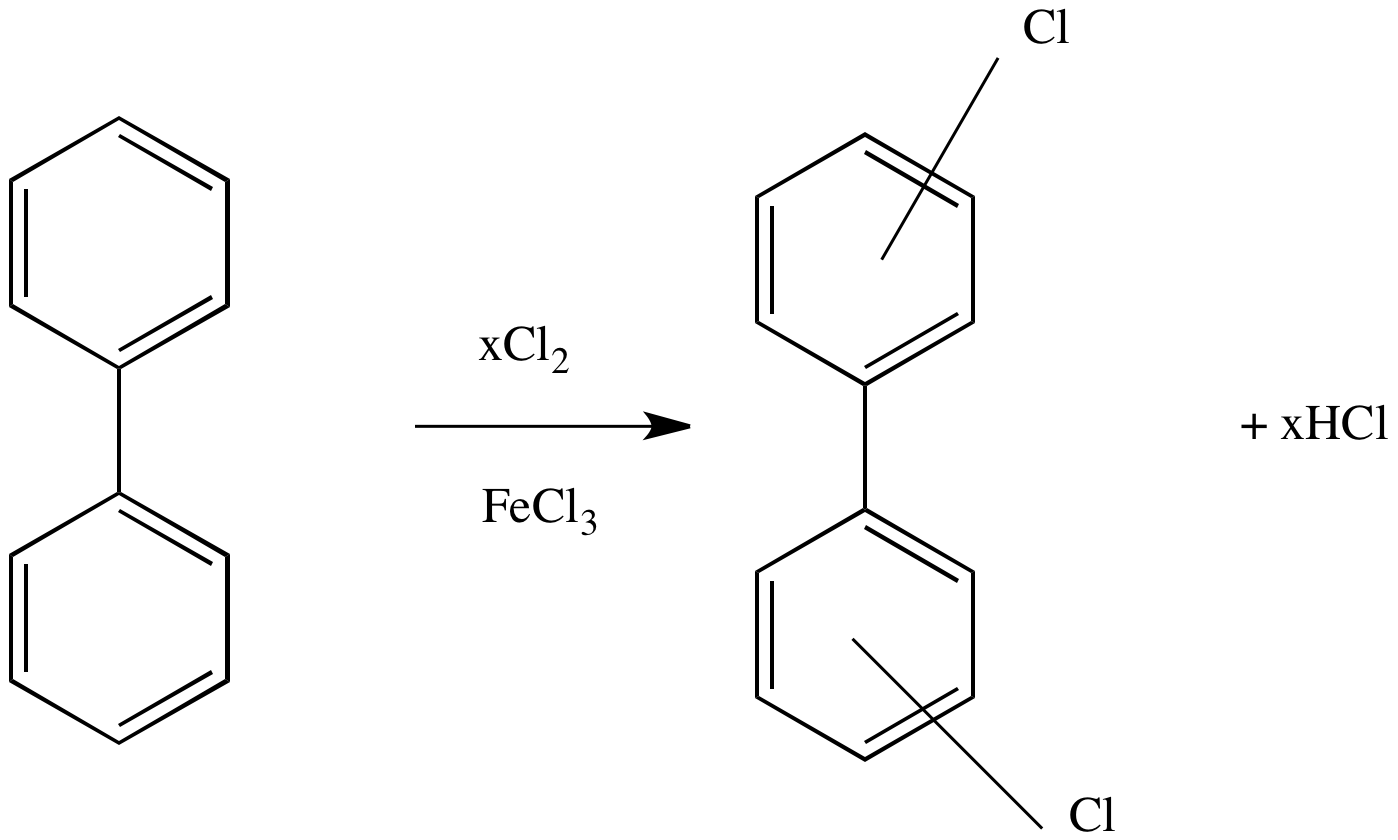
Synthesis and general structure of polychlorinated byphenyls.

==== Chlorinated Aromatic Hydrocarbons ====
Chlorinated aromatic hydrocarbons are resistant to bioremediation, and many microorganisms cannot degrade the compounds. Chlorinated aromatic hydrocarbons are most often degraded through a process of reductive dechlorination under anaerobic conditions. Polychlorinated biphenyls (PCBs) are primarily degraded through cometabolism. Some fungi can degrade these compounds as well. Studies show an increase in PCB degradation when biphenyl is added to the site due to the cometabolic effects that the enzymes used to degrade biphenyl have on PCBs.

== Benefits ==
With in situ bioremediation, there is a lessened risk of cross-contamination as opposed to ex situ bioremediation, where the polluted material is transported to other sites. In situ bioremediation also costs less.
