= Desulfitobacterium metallireducens =

Scientific classification
- Domain: Bacteria
- Kingdom: Bacillati
- Phylum: Bacillota
- Class: Clostridia
- Order: Eubacteriales
- Family: Desulfitobacteriaceae
- Genus: Desulfitobacterium
- Species: D. metallireducens

Binomial name
- Desulfitobacterium metallireducens Finneran et al. 2002

Species of bacterium

Desulfitobacterium metallireducens is an anaerobic bacterium that couples growth to the reduction of metals and humic acids as well as chlorinated compounds. Its type strain is 853-15A(T) (= ATCC BAA-636(T)). It was first isolated from a uranium-contaminated aquifer sediment.
