= Reductive dehalogenases =

Reductive dehalogenases (EC 1.97.1.8) are a group of enzymes utilized in organohalide respiring bacteria. These enzymes are mostly attached to the periplasmic side of the cytoplasmic membrane and play a central role in energy-conserving respiratory process for organohalide respiring bacteria by reducing organohalides. During such reductive dehalogenation reaction, organohalides are used as terminal electron acceptors. They catalyze the following general reactions:

R-X + 2 e^{−} + 2 H^{+} → R-H + H-X
X-RR-X + 2 e^{−} + 2 H^{+} → R=R + 2X^{−}

These membrane-associated enzymes have attracted great interest for the detoxification of organohalide pollutants. Organohalide pollution is a serious global environmental issue affecting soil and groundwater; and reductive dehalogenases offer a promising natural tool for bioremediation.

== Structure and mechanism ==
Reductive dehalogenases are related to the cobamide (or vitamin B12) family of enzymes. They contain a cobalamin at its catalytic active site, where actual reductive reaction occurs. They also harbor iron− sulfur clusters that supply the reducing equivalents. All membrane-associated dehalogenases harbor a N-terminal twin-arginine (TAT) signal sequence (RRXFXK), which is a conserved signal peptide for membrane protein translocation. Monomeric as well as dimeric forms were previously reported.

Enzymatic mechanism is still understudied; however, several studies reported various mechanisms involving an organocobalt adduct, a single-electron transfer, and a halogen–cobalt bond.

== Common reductive dehalogenases studied ==
=== Reductive dehalogenases from Dehalobacter species ===
- Chloroform reductive dehalogenases: TmrA and CfrA

=== Reductive dehalogenases from Dehalococcoides species ===
- Vinyl chloride reducing VcrA
- Hexachlorobenzene degrading CbrA

=== Reductive dehalogenases from Desulfitobacterium species ===
- Perchloroethene and trichloroethene degrading PceA

== Production methods ==
=== Native enzymes ===
The examples are those that can dechlorinate chloroform (TmrA), PCE (PceA), TCE (TceA), and VC (VcrA). Purification of such enzymes in native forms are reportedly difficult; however, a few such enzymes were purified to near homogeneity. Ultracentrifugation, membrane solubilization and a series of liquid chromatography are the commonly employed techniques to the isolation and purification. A chloroform reducing dehalogenase is the latest reductive dehalogenase that was successfully produced and purified.

=== Heterologous expressions ===
The researchers in the field had turned their interest to heterologous expression of the same enzymes due to difficulties in obtaining these enzymes in the native form. Only have recently a few recombinant reductive dehalogenases been functionally expressed, bringing the dehalogenase research into next levels. Those successful efforts facilitate further investigations on their biochemical and structural properties.

The first membrane-associated respiratory reductive dehalogenase was heterologously expressed in a soluble and active form and purified using Bacillus megaterium.

== Uses in bioremediation ==
In recent years, research on reductive dehalogenases have attracted great interest from both academic and industrial researchers for their potential application in bioremediation of organohalide contamination.
