= Trichloroethylene (data page) =

Chemical data page

This page provides supplementary chemical data on trichloroethylene.

== Material Safety Data Sheet ==
The handling of this chemical may incur notable safety precautions. It is highly recommend that you seek the Material Safety Datasheet (MSDS) for this chemical from a reliable source such as eChemPortal, and follow its directions.

- Mallinckrodt Baker.
- FLUKA.

== Structure and properties ==
Structure and properties
| Index of refraction,n_{D} | 1.4777 at 19.8 °C |
| Abbe number | ? |
| Dielectric constant, ε_{r} | 3.4 ε_{0} at 16 °C |
| Bond strength | ? |
| Bond length | ? |
| Bond angle | ? |
| Magnetic susceptibility | ? |
| Surface tension | 28.7 dyn/cm |
| Viscosity | 0.53 mPa·s at 25 °C |

== Thermodynamic properties ==
Phase behavior
| Triple point | 188.4 K (−84.7 °C), ? Pa |
| Critical point | 571 K (298 °C), 5016 kPa |
| Std enthalpy change of fusion, Δ_{fus}H^{~~o~~} | 8.45 kJ/mol |
| Std entropy change of fusion, Δ_{fus}S^{~~o~~} | 44.8 J/(mol·K) |
| Std enthalpy change of vaporization, Δ_{vap}H^{~~o~~} | 31.4 kJ/mol |
| Std entropy change of vaporization, Δ_{vap}S^{~~o~~} | ? J/(mol·K) |
Solid properties
| Std enthalpy change of formation, Δ_{f}H^{~~o~~}_{solid} | ? kJ/mol |
| Standard molar entropy, S^{~~o~~}_{solid} | ? J/(mol K) |
| Heat capacity, c_{p} | ? J/(mol K) |
Liquid properties
| Std enthalpy change of formation, Δ_{f}H^{~~o~~}_{liquid} | −53.1 kJ/mol |
| Standard molar entropy, S^{~~o~~}_{liquid} | ? J/(mol K) |
| Enthalpy of combustion, Δ_{c}H^{~~o~~}_{liquid} | −947.7 kJ/mol |
| Heat capacity, c_{p} | 120.1 J/(mol K) |
Gas properties
| Std enthalpy change of formation, Δ_{f}H^{~~o~~}_{gas} | −19.1 kJ/mol |
| Standard molar entropy, S^{~~o~~}_{gas} | ? J/(mol K) |
| Heat capacity, c_{p} | 80.7 J/(mol K) at 25 °C |

== Vapor pressure of liquid ==
| P in mm Hg | 1 | 10 | 40 | 100 | 400 | 760 |
| T in °C | −43.8 | −12.4 | 11.9 | 31.4 | 67.0 | 86.7 |

Table data obtained from CRC Handbook of Chemistry and Physics 44th ed.

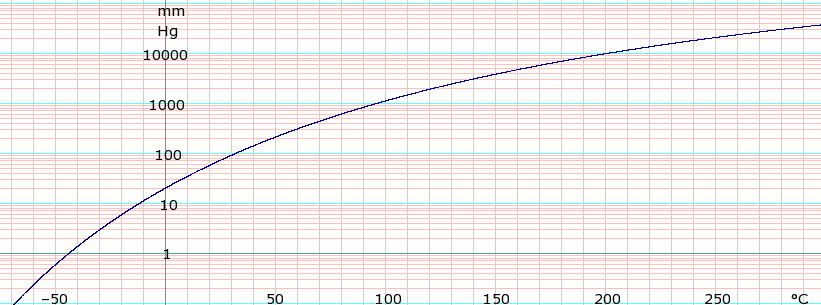
log_{10} of Trichloroethylene vapor pressure. Uses formula: $\scriptstyle \log_e P_{mmHg} =$$\scriptstyle \log_e (\frac {760} {101.325}) - 3.586434\log_e(T+273.15) - \frac {5142.974} {T+273.15} + 39.83149 + 1.342324 \times 10^{-6} (T+273.15)^2$ obtained from CHERIC

== Distillation data ==
Vapor-liquid Equilibrium for Trichloroethylene/Carbon tetrachloride P = 760 mmHg
| BP Temp. °C | % by mole CCl_{4} |
| BP Temp. °C | liquid | vapor |
| 86.0 | 6.0 | 7.5 |
| 85.1 | 14.7 | 17.6 |
| 84.4 | 20.2 | 25.0 |
| 84.2 | 22.4 | 27.8 |
| 83.5 | 27.4 | 34.4 |
| 83.1 | 31.5 | 38.0 |
| 82.5 | 37.6 | 44.5 |
| 81.3 | 49.0 | 56.5 |
| 81.0 | 52.5 | 58.9 |
| 80.5 | 58.0 | 65.0 |
| 80.0 | 62.7 | 70.0 |
| 79.1 | 70.6 | 78.0 |
| 78.5 | 76.7 | 82.9 |
| 78.1 | 80.4 | 86.6 |
| 77.3 | 91.8 | 95.0 |
| 76.9 | 96.5 | 98.0 |

Vapor-liquid Equilibrium for Trichloroethylene/Tetrachloroethylene; P = 760 mmHg
| BP Temp. °C | % by mole trichloroethylene |
| BP Temp. °C | liquid | vapor |
| 117.0 | 7.5 | 17.8 |
| 115.7 | 10.0 | 22.8 |
| 112.8 | 16.2 | 33.8 |
| 110.5 | 21.7 | 42.0 |
| 109.1 | 25.0 | 46.8 |
| 106.9 | 30.8 | 53.7 |
| 105.7 | 33.6 | 57.2 |
| 103.4 | 39.4 | 62.7 |
| 101.0 | 46.2 | 69.8 |
| 100.0 | 49.3 | 71.8 |
| 98.4 | 55.0 | 75.6 |
| 96.3 | 61.4 | 80.0 |
| 94.4 | 68.5 | 84.3 |
| 93.4 | 72.3 | 87.2 |
| 92.1 | 76.9 | 88.8 |
| 89.5 | 87.5 | 95.0 |

Vapor-liquid Equilibrium for Trichloroethylene/Isopropanol; P = 100 kPa
| BP Temp. °C | % by mole trichloroethylene |
| BP Temp. °C | liquid | vapor |
| 81.7 | 0.0 | 0.0 |
| 81.4 | 0.8 | 2.1 |
| 80.4 | 3.2 | 8.0 |
| 79.3 | 6.8 | 14.7 |
| 78.3 | 10.6 | 20.9 |
| 77.2 | 15.6 | 27.3 |
| 76.3 | 21.8 | 33.7 |
| 75.6 | 29.0 | 39.4 |
| 75.2 | 35.7 | 43.7 |
| 74.9 | 43.3 | 47.7 |
| 74.8 | 50.9 | 50.8 |
| 74.8 | 57.3 | 53.9 |
| 75.0 | 63.2 | 56.2 |
| 75.3 | 69.5 | 58.7 |
| 75.7 | 75.2 | 61.1 |
| 76.2 | 79.8 | 64.1 |
| 77.4 | 86.2 | 68.8 |
| 78.9 | 90.8 | 74.5 |
| 80.5 | 94.1 | 80.1 |
| 81.3 | 94.9 | 83.0 |
| 82.5 | 96.7 | 87.1 |
| 83.5 | 97.9 | 90.7 |
| 84.2 | 98.5 | 92.9 |
| 85.0 | 99.1 | 95.1 |
| 86.4 | 100.0 | 100.0 |

== Spectral data ==
UV-Vis
| λ_{max} | ? nm |
| Extinction coefficient, ε | ? |
IR
| Major absorption bands | ? cm^{−1} |
NMR
| Proton NMR |
| Carbon-13 NMR |
| Other NMR data |
MS
| Masses of main fragments |

This box:
- Except where noted otherwise, data relate to Standard temperature and pressure.
- Reliability of data general note.
