= Halohydrin dehalogenase =

Enzyme

A halohydrin dehalogenase is an enzyme involved in the bacterial degradation of vicinal halohydrins. In several species of bacteria, it catalyses the dehalogenation of halohydrins to produce the corresponding epoxides. Different isoforms of the enzyme fall into one of three groups, A, B or C. Halogenases of the same class are genetically similar, but differ greatly from halogenases from a different group. Currently the most well-studied isoform is HheC which is purified from the bacterial species Agrobacterium radiobacter. The ability to dehalogenate organic compounds as well as form enantiomeric selective epoxides have generated interest in the potential of this enzyme in the biochemical field.

== Structure ==
Currently of three known classes of halohydrin dehalogenases, only two have been described by x-ray crystallography studies. However, both of these classes have similar structure which can be described as follows(1): a halohydrin dehalogenase is structured as a tetramer with a symmetry characteristic of a dimer of dimers. Each monomeric subunit consists of seven alpha helices and nine beta-sheets. These monomers interact via the two longest alpha helices to form an alpha-helical bundle to form a dimer. The final quaternary structure is formed when two dimers interact via a different set of alpha helices and anti-parallel beta-sheets; interactions between the beta-sheets are thought to be a combination of both hydrophobic and electrostatic attraction.

There is approximately one catalytic site per monomer subunit giving a total of four possible catalytic sites on the enzymatic tetramer. The active site consists of a Ser132-Tyr145-Arg149 catalytic triad. The serine and tyrosine residues function to stabilize the substrate and its intermediate, while the arginine alters the pKa of Tyr145 to make it catalytically active.

== Mechanism ==
Halohydrin dehalogenases mechanistically cleaves the carbon-halogen bond through the formation of an epoxide from a vicinal hydroxyl group. The substrate binds to the active site through hydrogen bonding that is coordinated by Ser132 and the deprotonated form of Tyr145. Failure to deprotonate Tyr145 by the Arg149 residue results in destabilization of the interaction between the enzyme and substrate resulting in reduced biological activity. The oxygen in Tyr145 deprotonates the hydroxyl group of the substrate. The deprotonated oxygen then acts as a nucleophile and performs a Sn2 reaction on the vicinal carbon that is bonded to the halogen; this releases a halogen ion and simultaneously forms an epoxide. Dehalogenases are also able to catalyze the ring-opening of the epoxide. The active site is large enough to accommodate a nucleophile which can perform a nucleophilic attack on the epoxide, opening the epoxide ring and adding a new functional group to the substrate.

Overall mechanistic action of halohydrin dehalogenases

In regards to the geometry of the product, both class A and B dehalogenases have a low selective preference for the (S)-epoxide isomer. However, the preference for the formation of the (R)-epoxide isomer catalyzed by enzymes in class C, particularly HHeC, is high. One study reports that HHeC catalyzed (R)-epoxide up to 99% enantiomeric excess. However, the technology to purify this enzyme and utilize it on an industrial scale has yet to remain optimized.
