= Dichloromethane dehalogenase =

Identifiers
- EC no.: 4.5.1.3
- CAS no.: 97002-70-5

Databases
- IntEnz: IntEnz view
- BRENDA: BRENDA entry
- ExPASy: NiceZyme view
- KEGG: KEGG entry
- MetaCyc: metabolic pathway
- PRIAM: profile
- PDB structures: RCSB PDB PDBe PDBsum
Search
- PMC: articles
- PubMed: articles
- NCBI: proteins

Dichloromethane dehalogenase (EC 4.5.1.3; systematic name dichloromethane chloride-lyase (adding H_{2}O; chloride-hydrolysing; formaldehyde-forming)) is a lyase enzyme that generates formaldehyde.

dichloromethane + H_{2}O = formaldehyde + 2 chloride

Glutathione is required for its activity.
