= 4-chlorobenzoyl-CoA dehalogenase =

Class of enzymes

Identifiers
- EC no.: 3.8.1.7
- CAS no.: 141583-18-8

Databases
- BRENDA: enzyme data
- ExPASy: NiceZyme view
- KEGG: enzyme entry
- MetaCyc: metabolic pathway
- Rhea: reactions
- PDB structures: RCSB PDB PDBe PDBsum
- Gene Ontology: AmiGO / QuickGO
Search
- PMC: articles
- PubMed: articles
- NCBI: proteins

4-chlorobenzoyl-CoA dehalogenase (EC 3.8.1.7) is an enzyme charaterised from Pseudomonas and Arthrobacter species that catalyzes the hydrolysis of the coenzyme A (CoA) ester of 4-chlorobenzoic acid to the coresponding ester of 4-hydroxybenzoic acid, with chloride ion as a byproduct.

4-chlorobenzoyl-CoA + H_{2}O $\rightleftharpoons$ 4-hydroxybenzoyl-CoA + chloride

These bacteria have other enzymes which convert 4-chlorobenzoic acid to its CoA ester and the product to 4-hydroxybenzoic acid, as part of their catabolic pathways. The result is that this part of the process forms 4-hydroxybenzoic acid from 4-chlorobenzoic acid.

4-chlorobenzoic acid
H_{2}O
Cl^{−}
4-hydroxybenzoic acid

This enzyme is a hydrolase, specifically one acting on halide bonds in carbon-halide compounds. The systematic name of this enzyme class is 4-chlorobenzoyl CoA chlorohydrolase.
