= (R)-2-haloacid dehalogenase =

Class of enzymes

Identifiers
- EC no.: 3.8.1.9
- CAS no.: 119345-29-8

Databases
- BRENDA: enzyme data
- ExPASy: NiceZyme view
- KEGG: enzyme entry
- MetaCyc: metabolic pathway
- Rhea: reactions
- PDB structures: RCSB PDB PDBe PDBsum
Search
- PMC: articles
- PubMed: articles
- NCBI: proteins

In enzymology, a (R)-2-haloacid dehalogenase (EC 3.8.1.9), DL-2-haloacid halidohydrolase (inversion of configuration), DL-DEXi, (R,S)-2-haloacid dehalogenase (configuration-inverting)) is an enzyme that catalyzes the chemical reaction

(R)-2-haloacid + H_{2}O $\rightleftharpoons$ (S)-2-hydroxyacid + halide

Thus, the two substrates of this enzyme are (R)-2-haloacid and H_{2}O, whereas its two products are (S)-2-hydroxyacid and halide.

This enzyme belongs to the family of hydrolases, specifically those acting on halide bonds in carbon-halide compounds. The systematic name of this enzyme class is (R)-2-haloacid halidohydrolase. Other names in common use include 2-haloalkanoic acid dehalogenase[ambiguous], 2-haloalkanoid acid halidohydrolase[ambiguous], D-2-haloacid dehalogenase, and D-DEX.

D-DEXs lead to the production of 2-hydroxyacids and the release of halide ions from catalysing D-2-haloacid dehalogenation. D-DEXs are part of Group I dehalogenases, and this is due to similarity of the amino acid sequence. The D-DEX production of L-2-chloropropionic acid as an intermediate is related to herbicide production, there is a 30% similarity between DL-DEXs and D-DEXs in structure, and differences in DL-DEXs and D-DEXs are due to structural differences of the helical bend and the loop.
