= Reductive dechlorination =

Chemical reaction which breaks carbon-chlorine bonds via a reductant

In organochlorine chemistry, reductive dechlorination describes any chemical reaction which cleaves the covalent bond between carbon and chlorine via reductants, to release chloride ions. Many modalities have been implemented, depending on the application. Reductive dechlorination is often applied to remediation of chlorinated pesticides or dry cleaning solvents. It is also used occasionally in the synthesis of organic compounds, e.g. as pharmaceuticals.

== Chemical ==
Dechlorination is a well-researched reaction in organic synthesis, although it is not often used. Usually stoichiometric amounts of dechlorinating agent are required. In one classic application, the Ullmann reaction, chloroarenes are coupled to biphenyls. For example, the activated substrate 2-chloronitrobenzene is converted into 2,2'-dinitrobiphenyl with a copper - bronze alloy.

Ullmann reaction.

Zerovalent iron effects similar reactions. Organophosphorus(III) compounds effect gentle dechlorinations. The products are alkenes and phosphorus(V).

- Alkaline earth metals and zinc are used for more difficult dechlorinations. The side product is zinc chloride.

== Biological ==
Vicinal reduction involves the removal of two halogen atoms that are adjacent on the same alkane or alkene, leading to the formation of an additional carbon-carbon bond.

Biological reductive dechlorination is often effected by certain species of bacteria. Sometimes the bacterial species are highly specialized for organochlorine respiration and even a particular electron donor, as in the case of Dehalococcoides and Dehalobacter. In other examples, such as Anaeromyxobacter, bacteria have been isolated that are capable of using a variety of electron donors and acceptors, with a subset of possible electron acceptors being organochlorines. These reactions depend on a molecule which tends to be very aggressively sought after by some microbes, vitamin B12.

=== Bioremediation using reductive dechlorination ===
Reductive dechlorination of chlorinated organic molecules is relevant to bioremediation of polluted groundwater. One example is the organochloride respiration of the dry-cleaning solvent, tetrachloroethylene, and the engine degreasing solvent trichloroethylene by anaerobic bacteria, often members of the candidate genera Dehalococcoides. Bioremediation of these chloroethenes can occur when other microorganisms at the contaminated site provide H_{2} as a natural byproduct of various fermentation reactions. The dechlorinating bacteria use this H_{2} as their electron donor, ultimately replacing chlorine atoms in the chloroethenes with hydrogen atoms via hydrogenolytic reductive dechlorination. This process can proceed in the soil provided the availability of organic electron donors and the appropriate strains of Dehalococcoides. Trichloroethylene is dechlorinated via dichloroethene and vinyl chloride to ethylene.

A chloroform-degrading reductive dehalogenase enzyme has been reported in a Dehalobacter member. The chloroform reductive dehalogenase, termed TmrA, was found to be transcriptional up-regulated in response to chloroform respiration and the enzyme can be obtained both in native and recombinant forms.

Reductive dechlorination has been investigated for bioremediation of polychlorinated biphenyls (PCB) and chlorofluorocarbons (CFC). The reductive dechlorination of PCBs is performed by anaerobic microorganisms that utilize the PCB as an electron sink. The result of this is the reduction of the "meta" site, followed by the "para" site, and finally the "ortho" site, leading to a dechlorinated product. In the Hudson River, microorganisms effect dechlorination over the course of weeks. The resulting monochlorobiphenyls and dichlorobiphenyls are less toxic and more easily degradable by aerobic organisms compared to their chlorinated counterparts. The prominent drawback that has prevented the widespread use of reductive dechlorination for PCB detoxification and has decreased its feasibility is the issue of the slower than desired dechlorination rates. It has been suggested that bioaugmentation with DF-1 can lead to enhanced reductive dechlorination rates of PCBs through stimulation of dechlorination. Additionally, high inorganic carbon levels do not affect dechlorination rates in low PCB concentration environments.

The reductive dechlorination applies to CFCs. Reductive dechlorination of CFCs including CFC-11, CFC-113, chlorotrifluoroethene, CFC-12, HCFC-141b, and tetrachloroethene occur through hydrogenolysis. Reduction rates of CFC mirror theoretical rates calculated based on the Marcus theory of electron transfer rate.

== Electrochemical ==
The electrochemical reduction of chlorinated chemicals such as chlorinated hydrocarbons and chlorofluorocarbons can be carried out by electrolysis in appropriate solvents, such as mixtures of water and alcohol. Some of the key components of an electrolytic cell are types of electrodes, electrolyte mediums, and use of mediators. The cathode transfers electrons to the molecule, which decomposes to produce the corresponding hydrocarbon (hydrogen atoms substitute the original chlorine atoms) and free chloride ions. For instance, the reductive dechlorination of CFCs is complete and produces several hydrofluorocarbons (HFC) plus chloride.

Hydrodechlorination (HDC) is a type of reductive dechlorination that is useful due to its high reaction rate. It uses H_{2} as the reducing agent over a range of potential electrode reactors and catalysts. Amongst the types of catalysts studied such as precious metals (platinum, palladium, rhodium), transition metals (niobium and molybdenum), and metal oxides, a preference for precious metals overrides the others. As an example, palladium often adopts a lattice formation which can easily embed hydrogen gas making it more accessible to be readily oxidized. However a common issue for HDC is catalyst deactivation and regeneration. As catalysts are depleted, chlorine poisoning on surfaces can sometimes be observed, and on rare occasions, metal sintering and leaching occurs as a result.

Electrochemical reduction can be performed at ambient pressure and temperature. This will not disrupt microbial environments or raise extra cost for remediation. The process of dechlorination can be highly controlled to avoid toxic chlorinated intermediates and byproducts such as dioxins from incineration. Trichloroethylene and perchloroethylene are common targets of treatment which are directly converted to environmentally benign products. Chlorinated alkenes and alkanes are converted to hydrogen chloride which is then neutralized with a base. However, even though there are many potential benefits to adopting this method, research have mainly been conducted in a laboratory setting with a few cases of field studies making it not yet well established.
