= Haloalkane dehalogenase =

haloalkane dehalogenase
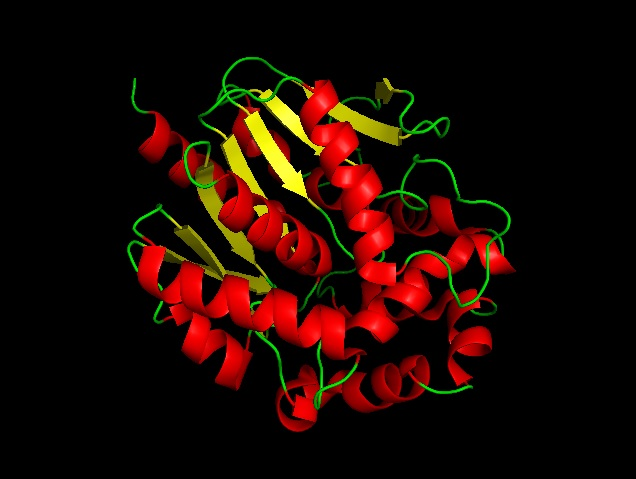
- Structural representation of haloalkane dehydrogenase

Identifiers
- EC no.: 3.8.1.5
- CAS no.: 95990-29-7

Databases
- IntEnz: IntEnz view
- BRENDA: BRENDA entry
- ExPASy: NiceZyme view
- KEGG: KEGG entry
- MetaCyc: metabolic pathway
- PRIAM: profile
- PDB structures: RCSB PDB PDBe PDBsum
- Gene Ontology: AmiGO / QuickGO
Search
- PMC: articles
- PubMed: articles
- NCBI: proteins

In enzymology, a haloalkane dehalogenase (EC 3.8.1.5) is an enzyme that catalyzes the chemical reaction

1-haloalkane + H_{2}O $\rightleftharpoons$ a primary alcohol + halide

Thus, the two substrates of this enzyme are 1-haloalkane and H_{2}O, whereas its two products are primary alcohol and halide.

This enzyme belongs to the family of hydrolases, specifically those acting on halide bonds in carbon-halide compounds. The systematic name of this enzyme class is 1-haloalkane halidohydrolase. Other names in common use include 1-chlorohexane halidohydrolase, and 1-haloalkane dehalogenase. Haloalkane dehalogenases are found in certain bacteria and belong the alpha-beta hydrolase fold superfamily of enzymes. They participate in several metabolic pathways: 1,2-dichloroethane degradation, 1-chloro-n-butane degradation, hexachlorocyclohexane degradation, 1,2-dibromoethane degradation, 2-chloroethyl-vinylether degradation, and 1,3-dichloropropene degradation.

== Enzyme Structure and Structural studies ==
Structurally, haloalkane dehalogenases belong to the alpha/beta-hydrolase superfamily. Their active site is buried in a predominantly hydrophobic cavity at the interface of the alpha/beta-hydrolase core domain and the helical cap domain, and is connected to the bulk solvent by access tunnels. The active-site residues that are essential for catalysis are referred to as the catalytic pentad, and comprise a nucleophilic aspartate residue, a basic histidine residue, an aspartic or glutamic acid moiety that serves as a general acid and either two tryptophan residues or a tryptophan-asparagine pair that serve to stabilize the leaving halide ion. The haloalkane dehalogenase family currently includes 14 distinct enzymes with experimentally confirmed dehalogenation activity. An analysis of the sequences and structures of haloalkane dehalogenase and their homologues divided the family into three subfamilies, which differ mainly in the composition of their catalytic pentad and cap domain.

As of late 2007, 25 structures have been solved for this class of enzymes, with PDB accession codes 1B6G, 1BE0, 1BEE, 1BEZ, 1BN6, 1BN7, 1CIJ, 1CQW, 1CV2, 1D07, 1EDB, 1EDD, 1EDE, 1HDE, 1K5P, 1K63, 1K6E, 1MJ5, 2DHC, 2DHD, 2DHE, 2EDA, 2EDC, 2PKY, and 2YXP.

== Enzyme mechanism ==
The main reaction is an SN2 displacement of the halogen for a hydroxyl group derived from water. To begin, aspartate 124 is perfectly aligned with the substrate. It will drive off the halogen and form an ester functionality carbon-oxygen bond. Following this displacement is a hydrolysis reaction by utilizing the imidazole ring of histidine 289 as the general base. This will deprotonate water, form a tetrahedral intermediate at the original ester, and create an imidazolium cation at histidine. The final step is beta-elimination. With a newly formed imidazolium cation ready to be an acid, aspartate 124 reverts to its original acidic state and breaks the ester linkage, as well as deprotonating histidine 289. The alcohol is eliminated and the halogen is now a free anion. Also taking place in a facilitating role are tryptophan groups in the periphery of the active site. These residues provide hydrogen bond donor groups to the chloride as it begins to undergo the SN2 reaction and become an anion. A second tryptophan also provides rigidity through a stable peptide bond to aspartate 124. It holds the beta-carbon oxygen in place so that it’s in prime position to make the ester linkage.

== Industrial functionality ==
A number of halogenated compounds are environmentally toxic industrial by-products, and it has been suggested that haloalkane dehalogenases may be useful catalysts for their biodegradation, with potential applications in bioremediation. In biocatalysis, there is a standing interest in these enzymes, particularly for the production of optically pure alcohols. Therefore, the identification of dehalogenating enzymes with appropriate selectivity patterns is very important in terms of their industrial utility.
