= Epoxybutane =

Epoxybutane may refer to:

- 1,2-Epoxybutane
- 1,4-Epoxybutane (tetrahydrofuran)
- 2,3-Epoxybutane
