= Haloacetate dehalogenase =

Class of enzymes

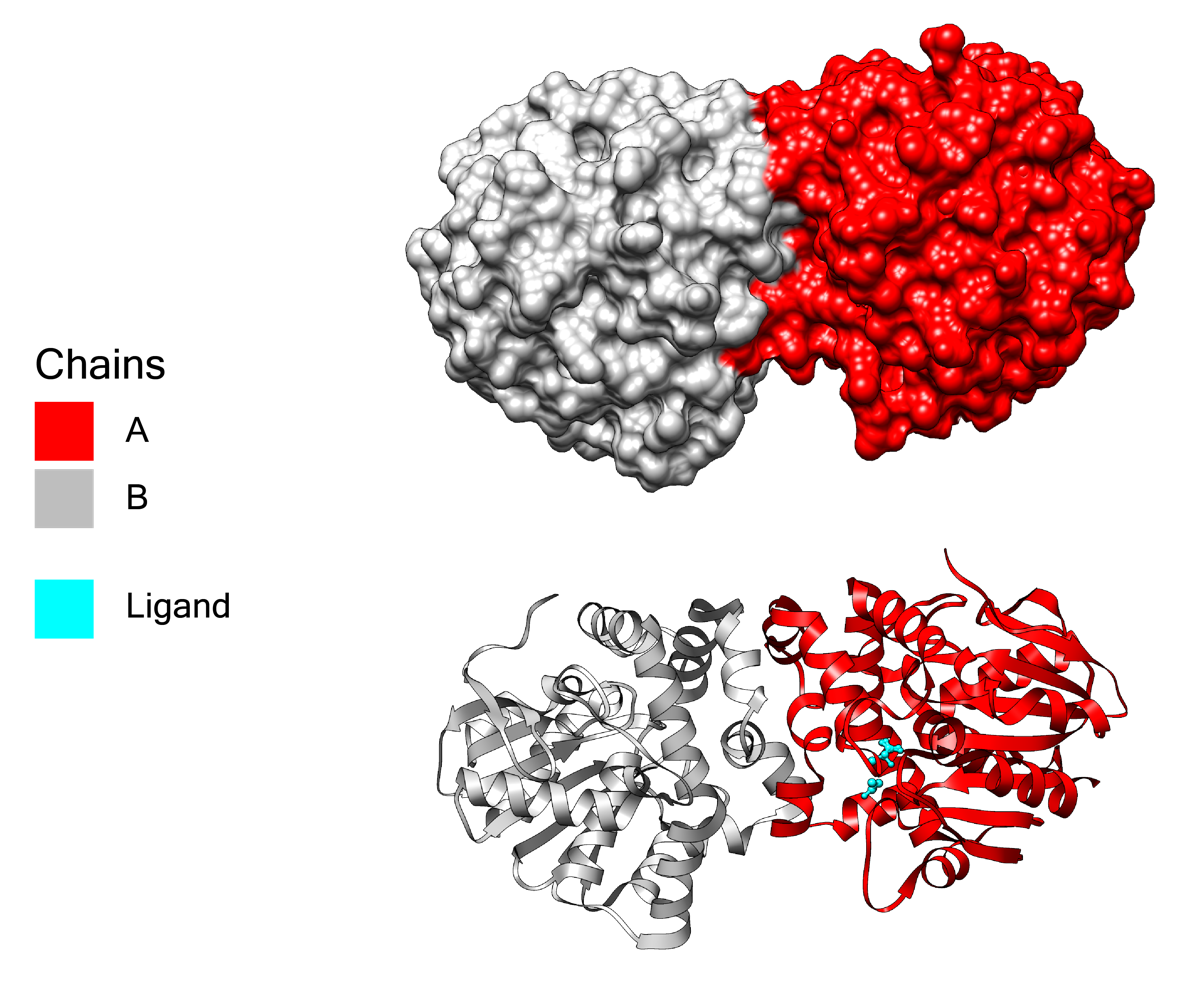
- Rhodopseudomonas palustris haloacetate dehalogenase

Identifiers
- EC no.: 3.8.1.3
- CAS no.: 37289-40-0

Databases
- BRENDA: enzyme data
- ExPASy: NiceZyme view
- KEGG: enzyme entry
- MetaCyc: metabolic pathway
- Rhea: reactions
- PDB structures: RCSB PDB PDBe PDBsum
- Gene Ontology: AmiGO / QuickGO
Search
- PMC: articles
- PubMed: articles
- NCBI: proteins

In enzymology, a haloacetate dehalogenase (EC 3.8.1.3) is an enzyme that catalyzes the chemical reaction

haloacetate + H_{2}O $\rightleftharpoons$ glycolate + halide

Thus, the two substrates of this enzyme are haloacetate and H_{2}O, whereas its two products are glycolate and halide. For example, in the case of fluoroacetate it will produce glycolate and fluoride.

This enzyme belongs to the family of hydrolases, one of the largest known enzyme families comprising approximately 1% of the genes in the human genome, exists as a homodimer, and acts specifically on halide bonds in carbon-halide compounds. The systematic name of this enzyme class is haloacetate halidohydrolase. This enzyme is also called monohaloacetate dehalogenase and fluoroacetate dehalogenase. This enzyme participates in gamma-hexachlorocyclohexane degradation and 1,2-dichloroethane degradation.

== Reactions ==
Haloacetate dehalogenase is unique because it catalyzes the cleavage of the remarkably stable carbon–fluorine bond of a fluorinated aliphatic compound. In the reaction of L-2-haloacid dehalogenase and fluoroacetate dehalogenase, the carboxylate group performs a nucleophilic attack on the alpha-carbon atom, moving the halogen atom. This action is common to haloalkane dehalogenase and 4-chlorobenzoyl-CoA dehalogenase. DL-2-Haloacid dehalogenase is unique in that a water molecule directly attacks the substrate, displacing the halogen atom.

== Significance ==
As fluoroacetate is poisonous and present in plants endemic to Australia, Africa, and Central America, livestock are often killed by fluoroacetate poisoning. Fluoroacetate is lethal to sheep and cattle at doses of 0.25 to 0.5 mg/kg of body weight, and is a problem in the livestock industry. A fluoroacetate dehalogenase gene from the soil bacterium Moraxella species strain B was transferred into the rumen bacterium Butyrivibrio fibrisolvens and expressed in vitro at sufficiently high levels to detoxify fluoroacetate in the surrounding medium. Scientists and farmers want to determine a way to get B. fibrisolvens into either the animals or plants.

== Structural studies ==
As of late 2007, only one structure has been solved for this class of enzymes, with the PDB accession code PDB: 1Y37.
