= (S)-2-haloacid dehalogenase =

Class of enzymes

Identifiers
- EC no.: 3.8.1.2
- CAS no.: 37289-39-7

Databases
- IntEnz: IntEnz view
- BRENDA: BRENDA entry
- ExPASy: NiceZyme view
- KEGG: KEGG entry
- MetaCyc: metabolic pathway
- PRIAM: profile
- PDB structures: RCSB PDB PDBe PDBsum
- Gene Ontology: AmiGO / QuickGO
Search
- PMC: articles
- PubMed: articles
- NCBI: proteins

In enzymology, a (S)-2-haloacid dehalogenase (EC 3.8.1.2) is an enzyme that catalyzes the chemical reaction

(S)-2-haloacid + H_{2}O $\rightleftharpoons$ (R)-2-hydroxyacid + halide

Thus, the two substrates of this enzyme are (S)-2-haloacid and H_{2}O, whereas its two products are (R)-2-hydroxyacid and halide.

This enzyme belongs to the family of hydrolases, specifically those acting on halide bonds in carbon-halide compounds. The systematic name of this enzyme class is (S)-2-haloacid halidohydrolase. Other names in common use include 2-haloacid dehalogenase[ambiguous], 2-haloacid halidohydrolase [ambiguous][ambiguous], 2-haloalkanoic acid dehalogenase, 2-haloalkanoid acid halidohydrolase, 2-halocarboxylic acid dehalogenase II, DL-2-haloacid dehalogenase[ambiguous], L-2-haloacid dehalogenase, and L-DEX. This enzyme participates in gamma-hexachlorocyclohexane degradation and 1,2-dichloroethane degradation.

== Structural studies ==
As of late 2007, 10 structures have been solved for this class of enzymes, with PDB accession codes 1AQ6, 1JUD, 1QH9, 1QQ5, 1QQ6, 1QQ7, 1ZRM, 1ZRN, 2NO4, and 2NO5.
