= Dehalobacter =

Scientific classification
- Domain: Bacteria
- Kingdom: Bacillati
- Phylum: Bacillota
- Class: Clostridia
- Order: Eubacteriales
- Family: Desulfitobacteriaceae
- Genus: Dehalobacter; Holliger et al. 1998

Type species
- Dehalobacter restrictus Holliger et al. 1998

Species
- "Ca. D. alkaniphilus"; D. restrictus

Genus of bacteria

Dehalobacter is a genus in the phylum Bacillota (Bacteria).

== Etymology ==
The generic name Dehalobacter derives from Latin de, from; halogenum from Swedish, coined by Swedish chemist Baron Jöns Jakob Berzelius (1779–1848) from Greek hals, halos "salt" + gen "to produce", so called because a salt is formed in reactions involving these elements; a rod bacter, nominally meaning "a rod", but in effect meaning a bacterium, a rod; giving Dehalobacter, a halogen-removing, rod-shaped bacterium.

== Species ==
The genus contains two species, namely D. restrictus (Holliger et al. 1998), type species of the genus. The specific name is from Latin restrictus, limited, restricted, confined, referring to the limited substrate range used. Recently, Dehalobacter sp. UNSWDHB, which dechlorinate chloroform to dichloromethane, and its reductive dehalogenase were identified.
