= Bioaugmentation =

Concept in microbiology

Bioaugmentation is a type of bioremediation commonly used in municipal wastewater treatment to restart activated sludge bioreactors. Most cultures available contain microbial cultures, already containing all necessary microorganisms (B. licheniformis, B. thuringiensis, P. polymyxa, B. stearothermophilus, Penicillium sp., Aspergillus sp., Flavobacterium, Arthrobacter, Pseudomonas, Streptomyces, Saccharomyces, etc.). Activated sludge systems are generally based on microorganisms like bacteria, protozoa, nematodes, rotifers, and fungi, which are capable of degrading biodegradable organic matter. There are many positive outcomes from the use of bioaugmentation, such as the improvement in efficiency and speed of the process of breaking down substances and the reduction of toxic particles in an area.

== Case studies ==
Aside from waste water treatment, bioaugmentation remains more aspirational than practical on scale.

=== Soil remediation ===
Relevant to soil remediation, bioaugmentation has been proposed for decontamination of polluted soils. It has been proposed for treatment of chlorocarbons (e.g. from dry cleaning facilities) and hydrocarbons (e.g. from petrol stations), TX. Bioaugmentation is typically performed in conjunction with the addition of electron donor (biostimulation) to achieve geochemical conditions in groundwater that favor the growth of the dechlorinating microorganisms in the bioaugmentation culture.

=== Coke waste ===
Bioaugmentation has been applied to coke. Coal in China is used as a main energy source and the contaminated water contains harmful contaminants like ammonia, thiocyanate, phenols, and other organic compounds, such as mono- and polycyclic, and a variety of heterocyclics.

=== Petroleum cleanup ===
In the petroleum industry, there is a large problem with remediation of oilfield drilling pits, some times measured in total petroleum hydrocarbon (TPH) levels. The metabolism of polycyclic aromatic hydrocarbons by some bacteria is potentially relevant, but progress has been slow.

=== Failures and potential solutions ===
There have been many instances where bioaugmentation had deficiencies in its process, including the use of the wrong organism. The implementation of bioaugmentation on the environment can pose problems of predation, nutritional competition between indigenous and inoculated bacteria, insufficient inoculations, and disturbing the ecological balance due to large inoculations. Each problem can be solved using different techniques to limit the possibilities of these problems occurring. Predation can be prevented by high initial doses of the inoculated bacteria or heat treatment prior to inoculation whereas nutritional competition can be settled with biostimulation. Insufficient inoculations can be treated by repeated or continual inoculations and large inoculations are resolved with highly monitored dosages of the bacteria.

Examples include the introduced bacteria fail to enhance the degradation within the soil, and the bioaugmentation trials fail on the laboratory scale, but succeed on the large scale. Many of these problems occurred because the microbial ecology issues were not taken into consideration in order to map the performance of the bioaugmentation. It is crucial to consider the microbes' ability to withstand the conditions in the microbial community to be placed in. In many of the cases that have failed, only the microbes' ability to break down compounds was considered and less their fitness in existing communities and the resulting competitive stress. It is better to identify the existing communities before looking at the strains needed to break down pollutants.

== See also ==
- biotransformation
- Syntrophomonas zehnderi
- Dehalococcoidetes
