= Trichloroethylene =

C2HCl3, widely used industrial solvent

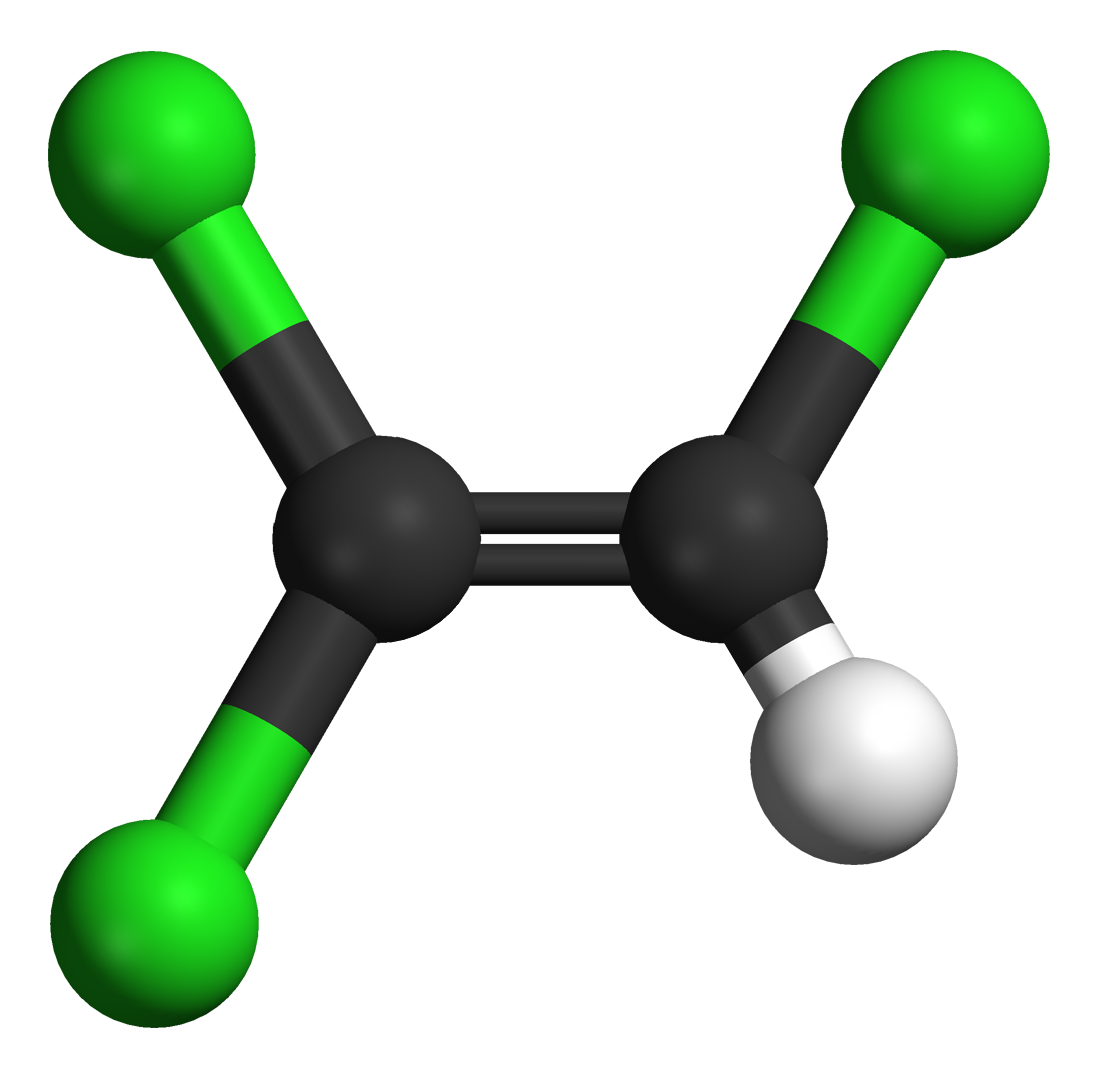

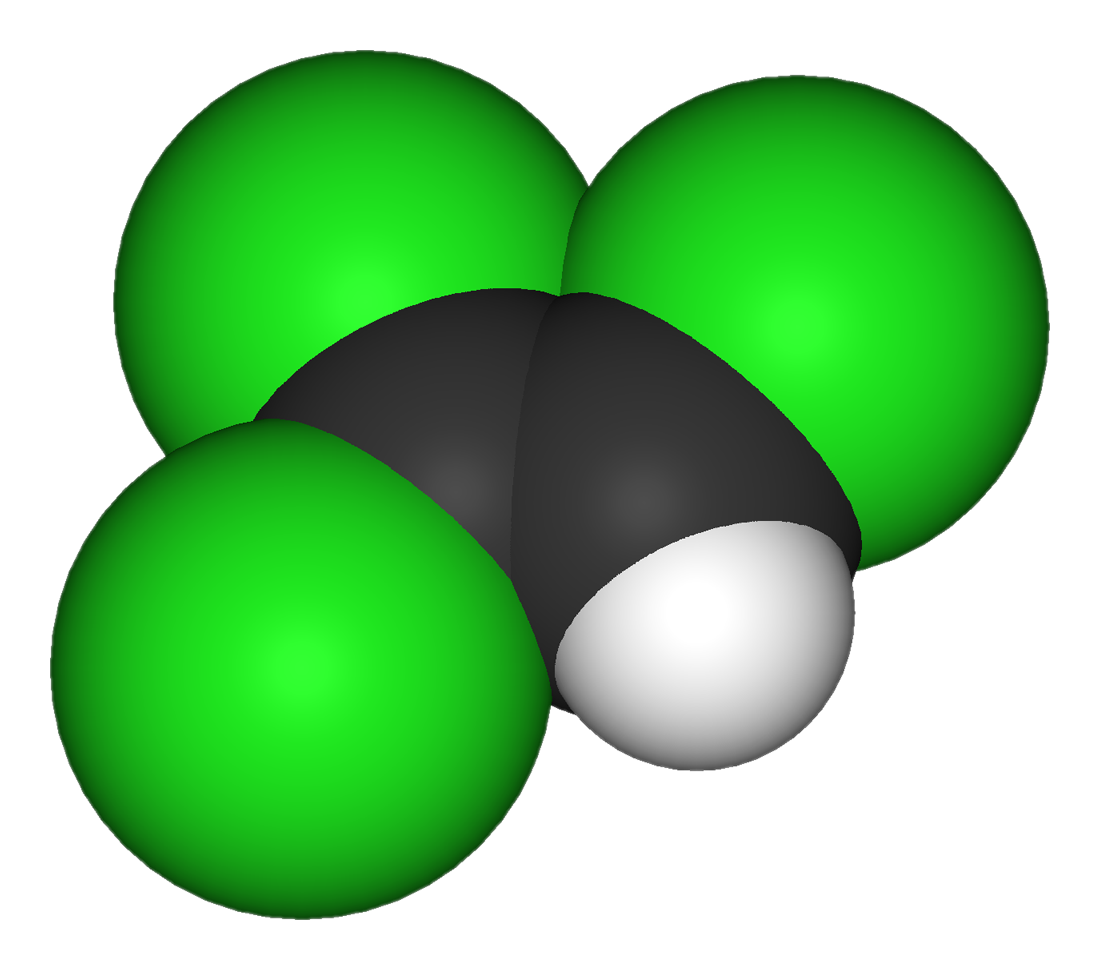

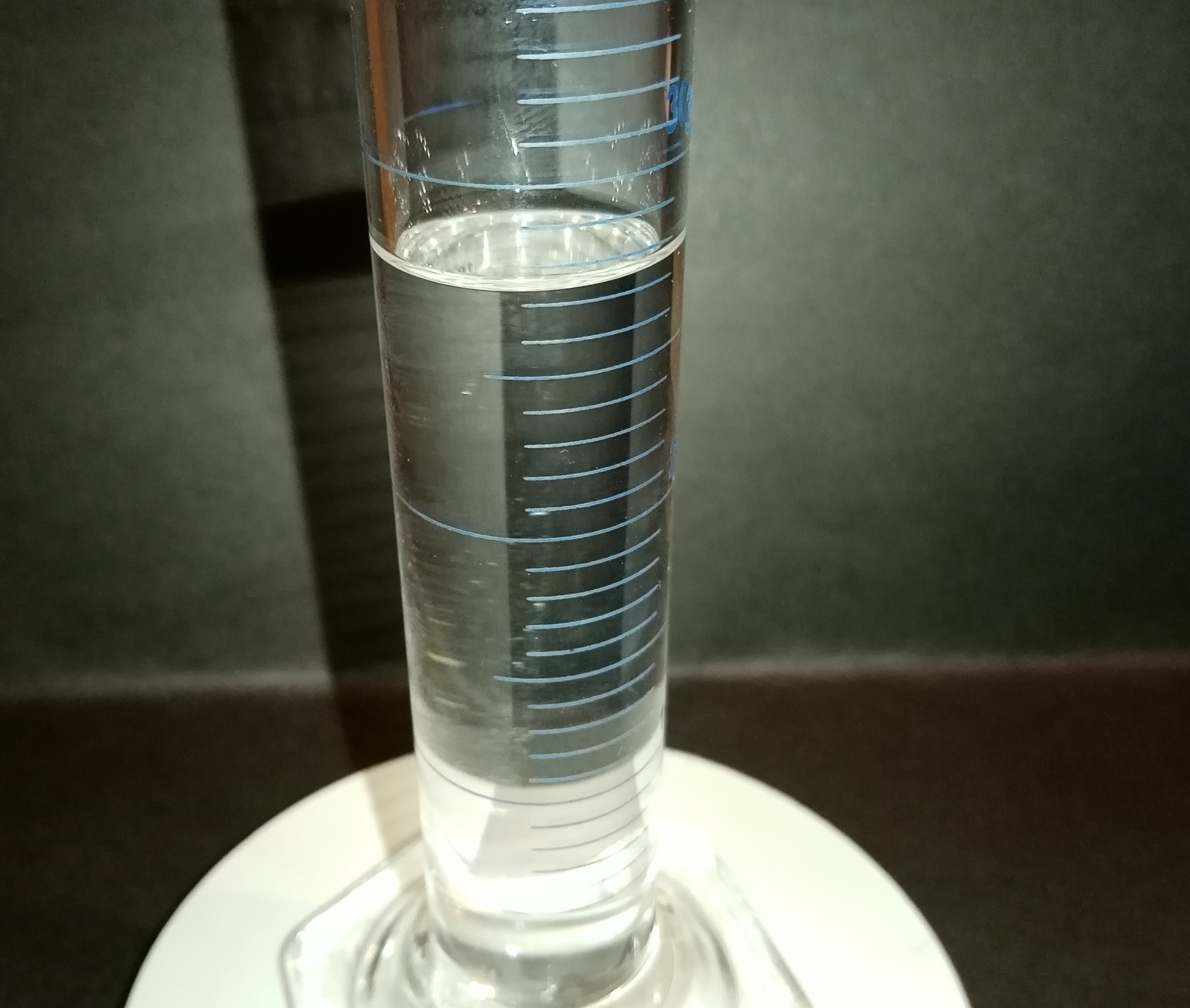
- Sample of trichloroethylene

Names
Pronunciation	/trʌɪˌklɔːrəʊˈɛθɪliːn/
- Preferred IUPAC name Trichloroethene
- Other names 1-Chloro-2,2-dichloroethylene; 1,1-Dichloro-2-chloroethylene; Acetylene Trichloride; Ethinyl Trichloride; Ethylene Trichloride; Terchlorethylene; Chloréthérise; Trade names: Algylen; Anamenth; Chlorylene; Gemalgene; Trethylene; Triclene; Trico; Trieline; Triklone; Trilene; Trimar

Identifiers
CAS Number	79-01-6
3D model (JSmol)	Interactive image; Interactive image; Interactive image
Abbreviations	TCE, HCO-1120, Tri, Trichlor
ChEBI	CHEBI:16602
ChEMBL	ChEMBL279816
ChemSpider	13837280
ECHA InfoCard	100.001.062
EC Number	201-167-4
KEGG	C06790
PubChem CID	6575
RTECS number	KX4550000
UNII	290YE8AR51
UN number	1710
CompTox Dashboard (EPA)	DTXSID0021383
- InChI: InChI=1S/C2HCl3/c3-1-2(4)5/h1H Key: XSTXAVWGXDQKEL-UHFFFAOYSA-N; InChI=1/C2HCl3/c3-1-2(4)5/h1H
- SMILES: Cl\C=C(/Cl)Cl; Cl\C=C(/Cl)Cl; ClC=C(Cl)Cl

Properties
Chemical formula	C_{2}HCl_{3}
Molar mass	131.38 g·mol^{−1}
Appearance	Colorless liquid
Odor	sweet, pleasant, chloroform-like
Density	1.46 g/cm^{3} at 20 °C
Melting point	−84.8 °C (−120.6 °F; 188.3 K) some sources also list –73 °C as the freezing point
Boiling point	86.7 °C (188.1 °F; 359.8 K)
Solubility in water	1.280 g/L
Solubility	Ether, ethanol, chloroform
log P	2.26
Vapor pressure	58 mmHg (0.076 atm) at 20 °C
Magnetic susceptibility (χ)	−65.8·10^{−6} cm^{3}/mol
Refractive index (n_{D})	1.4777 at 19.8 °C
Viscosity	0.532 mPa·s

Pharmacology
ATC code	N01AB05 (WHO)

Hazards
- Occupational safety and health (OHS/OSH)
Main hazards	Acute exposure can cause dizziness, sedation, and loss of consciousness. Chronic high-concentration exposure may increase cancer risk. Unstable in presence of sunlight and caustic soda.
- GHS labelling
Pictograms	(GHS08: Health hazard) (GHS07: Exclamation mark)
NFPA 704 (fire diamond)	2 1 0
Autoignition temperature	420 °C (788 °F; 693 K)
Explosive limits	8–10.5%
- Lethal dose or concentration (LD, LC)
LD_{50} (median dose)	7000 mg/kg (oral, human); 4920 mg/kg (oral, rat), 29000 mg/kg (dermal, rabbit)
LC_{50} (median concentration)	8450 ppm (mouse, 4 hr); 26300 ppm (rat, 1 hr)
LC_{Lo} (lowest published)	2900 ppm (human); 37,200 ppm (guinea pig, 40 min); 5952 ppm (cat, 2 hr); 8000 ppm (rat, 4 hr); 11,000 ppm (rabbit)
- NIOSH (US health exposure limits)
PEL (Permissible)	TWA 100 ppm C 200 ppm 300 ppm (5-minute maximum peak in any 2 hours)
REL (Recommended)	Ca
IDLH (Immediate danger)	Ca [1000 ppm]
Safety data sheet (SDS)	Carl Roth
Legal status	BR: Class B1 (Psychoactive drugs); US: banned for medical use (1977), all use banned (2024)

Related compounds
Related vinyl halides	Vinyl chloride Tetrachloroethylene; Trifluoroethylene
Related compounds	Chloroform; 1,1,1-Trichloroethane; 1,1,2-Trichloroethane; Chloral

Supplementary data page
- Trichloroethylene (data page)
- Except where otherwise noted, data are given for materials in their standard state (at 25 °C [77 °F], 100 kPa). verify (what is ?) Infobox references

Trichloroethylene (TCE, IUPAC name: trichloroethene) is an organochloride with the formula C_{2}HCl_{3}, commonly used as an industrial degreaser. It is a clear, colourless, non-flammable, volatile liquid with a sweet chloroform-like pleasant mild smell and burning sweet taste. Trichloroethylene has been sold under a variety of trade names for various purposes. Under the trade names Trimar and Trilene, it was used as a volatile anesthetic and as an inhaled obstetrical analgesic in millions of patients. Industrial abbreviations include trichlor, Trike, Tricky and tri.

Trichloroethylene is heavier than water and insoluble in it. It sinks under water when spilt, migrating downward through soil and aquifers. Settling at the bottom, it forms persistent subsurface contamination that is difficult to detect and remediate.

== History ==
The earliest trichloroethylene synthesis was reported by Auguste Laurent in 1836. Laurent obtained it from the action of potassium hydroxide on a mixture of 1,1,2,2-tetrachloroethane and 1,1,1,2-tetrachloroethane made from the chlorination of ethylene dichloride and notated it as C_{4}HCl_{3} (at the time, the atomic weight of carbon was thought to be half of what it really is). He named trichloroethylene chlorétherise but did not investigate the compound further as his sample seemed unstable.

In 1864, Dr. E. Fischer obtained trichloroethylene by the reduction of hexachloroethane with hydrogen. Fischer investigated the compound and noted its boiling point as 87-90 °C.

First industrial plant for producing trichloroethylene was opened in Jajce, Austria-Hungary (modern-day Bosnia) in 1908. Commercial production of trichloroethylene began in Germany, in 1920 and in the United States in 1925.

As early as 1920, trichloroethylene was reported to cause sickness and severe narcotic effects including sleepiness and fainting in exposed workers.

The use of trichloroethylene in the food and pharmaceutical industries has been banned in some parts of the world since the 1970s due to concerns about its toxicity.

=== Anaesthesia ===
Trichloroethylene is a good analgesic at 0.35 to 0.5% concentrations. Trichloroethylene has a blood/gas coefficient of 9, oil/gas coefficient of 714, and a minimum alveolar concentration of 0.23% in humans. It was mainly used as a general anaesthetic for small procedures and inhaled obsterical analgesic on millions of patients.

Trichloroethylene was first used in the treatment of trigeminal neuralgia beginning in 1916 after the recommendation by the German neurologist Hermann Oppenheim in 1915. Trichloroethylene for use as an analgesic for neuralgia were sold under the trade names "Gemalgene", "Trethylene" and "Chlorylen" in the 1920s.

American pharmacologist Dennis Emerson Jackson used trichloroethylene on patients given by the inhaler he developed in 1933 and published the report in 1934. Jackson later published a larger report on applying trichloroethylene on 300 patients along with the researchers Cecil Striker, Samuel Goldblatt, Irwin S. Warm in 1935. English anaesthetist Christopher Langton Hewer introduced trichloroethylene for anaesthetic use in Britain, in 1941. Hewer found that Imperial Chemical Industries (ICI) was already producing purified medical-grade trichloroethylene in Britain under the trade name Trilene (from trichloroethylene). Trilene was the purest TCE in the market at the time and other TCE formulations had impurities that could be unsafe for inhalation. Hewer noted that ICI sold Trilene for external wound cleaning. Hewer claimed that TCE would not pose cardiac danger based on a small group of patients, and mentions a death occurring during a TCE-nitrous oxide anaesthesia.

Pioneered by ICI in Britain, its development was hailed as an anesthetic revolution. It was also sold as "Trimar" in the United States. The –mar suffix indicated study and development at the University of Maryland, e.g., "Fluoromar" for fluroxene and "Vinamar" for ethyl vinyl ether". From the 1940s through the 1980s, both in Europe and North America, trichloroethylene was used as a volatile anesthetic almost invariably administered with nitrous oxide. Marketed in the UK by Imperial Chemical Industries under the trade name Trilene it was coloured blue with a dye called waxoline blue in 1:200,000 concentration to avoid confusion with the similar-smelling chloroform. Trilene was stabilised with 0.01% thymol. "Anamenth" was an early German anaesthetic trichloroethylene formulation which contained menthol as the stabiliser.

Trichloroethylene was also used as an inhaled analgesic, mainly during childbirth, often self-applied by the patient. It was introduced for obstetrical anaesthesia in 1943, and used until the 1980s. Self-administration of trichloroethylene by the patient was common for obstetrical use with specialised devices that required little supervision by the medical staff. When used in analgesic doses, it did not affect the uterine muscles during labour. Other analgesic uses included dental operations, superficial plastic and orthopedic surgeries and other small procedures that did not require muscle relaxation.

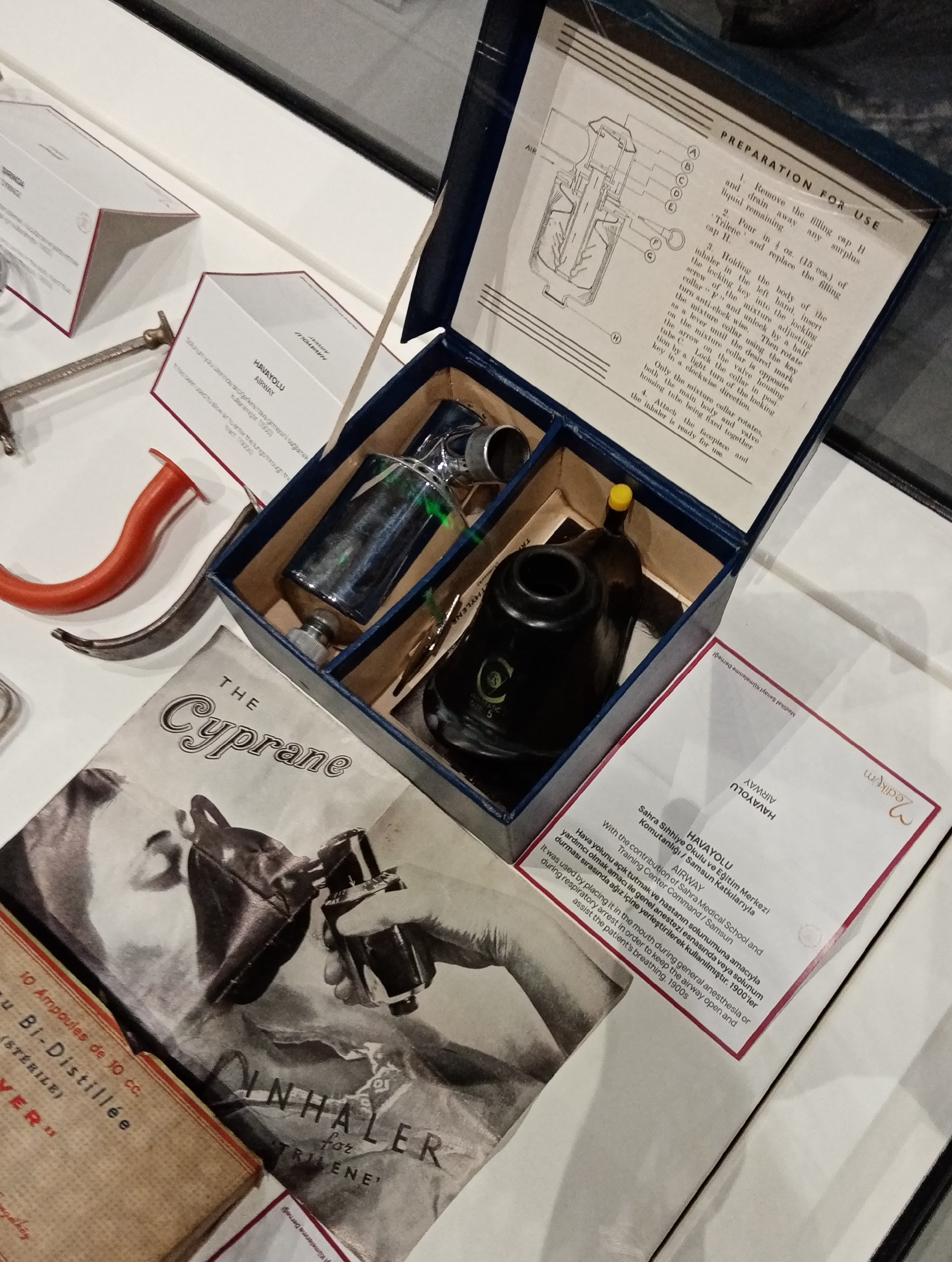
Cyprane handheld anaesthetic device for trichloroethylene, made in the UK, 1947. This device was designed for self-administration by the patient.

Triservice Anaesthetic Apparatus (TSAA) is a portable draw-over vapouriser originally designed for trichloroethylene and halothane using ambient air as the carrier gas for the anaesthetic vapour. It was designed by Ivan Houghton for military/field use in 1981. It used trichloroethylene for its analgesic properties and halothane for main general anaesthesia.

Originally thought to possess less hepatotoxicity than chloroform, and without the unpleasant pungency and flammability of ether, TCE replaced earlier anesthetics chloroform and ether in the 1940s. TCE use was nonetheless soon found to have several pitfalls. These included promotion of cardiac arrhythmias, sensitivity to catecholamines in the heart, low volatility and high solubility preventing quick anesthetic induction, prolonged neurologic dysfunction from the reaction with soda lime used in carbon dioxide absorbing systems, and evidence of hepatotoxicity as had been found with chloroform, although the hepatotoxic effects (such as central necrosis and acute yellow atrophy) were reported to be temporary. Alkali components of carbon dioxide absorbers reacted with trichloroethylene and released dichloroacetylene, a neurotoxin and a nephrotoxin. Most of the trichloroethylene toxicity cases were due to its breakdown into dichloroacetylene from the reaction with the soda lime, rather than trichloroethylene itself. Dichloroacetylene poisoning was common and often fatal during trichloroethylene anaesthesia if soda lime was used. Patients exposed to dichloroacetylene showed symptoms such as nausea, vomiting, loss of apetite, headache, facial nervous and muscular issues, and formation of herpes-like lesions on the face. Formation of dichloroacetylene lead to fatal encephalopathies and cranial nerve palsies. The muscle relaxant effect of trichloroethylene was inefficient for surgery.

The introduction of halothane in 1956 greatly diminished the use of TCE as a general anesthetic in the 1960s, as halothane allowed much faster induction and recovery times and was considerably easier to administer. Trichloroethylene has also been used in the production of halothane.

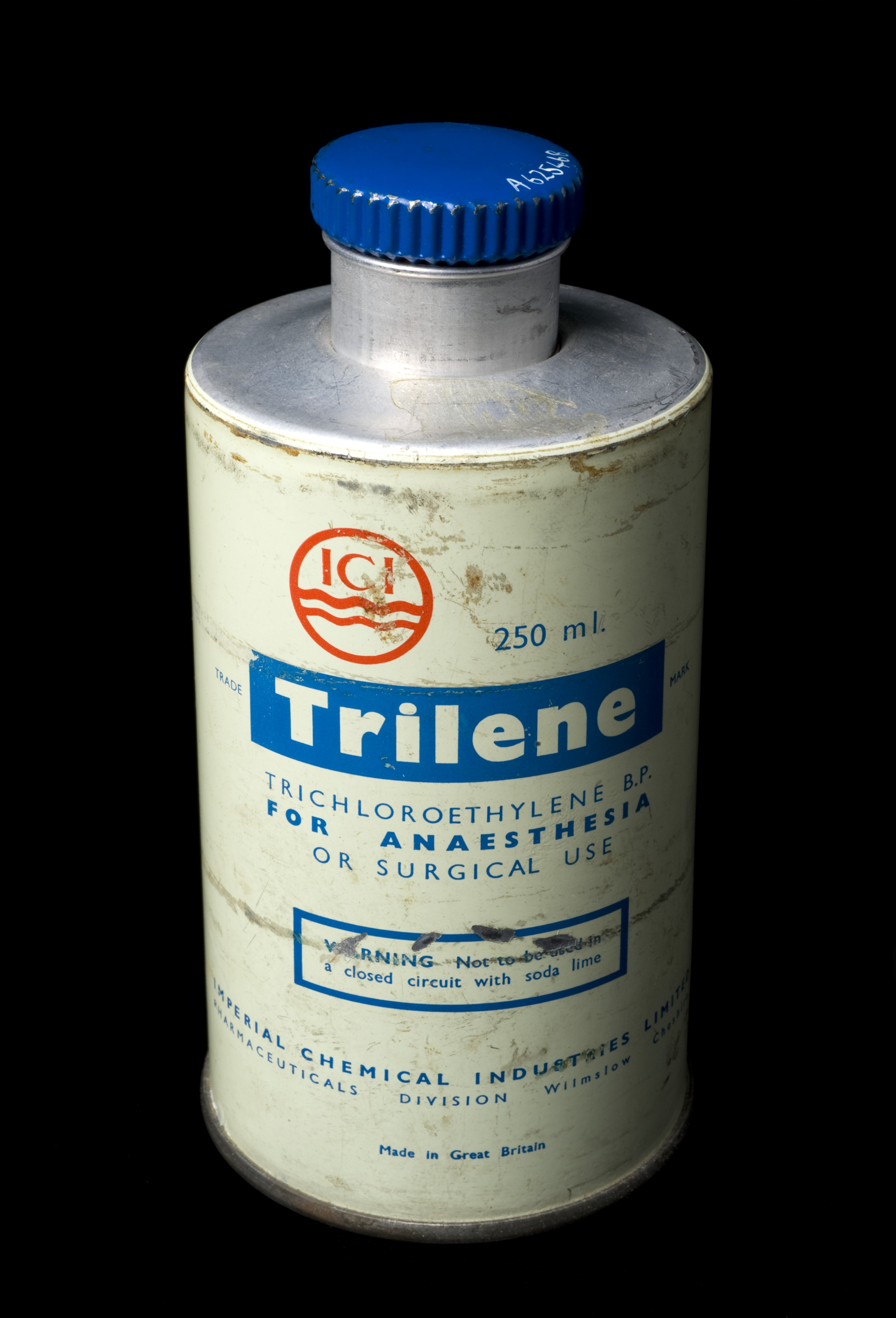
A Bottle of trichloroethylene for anesthesia by ICI

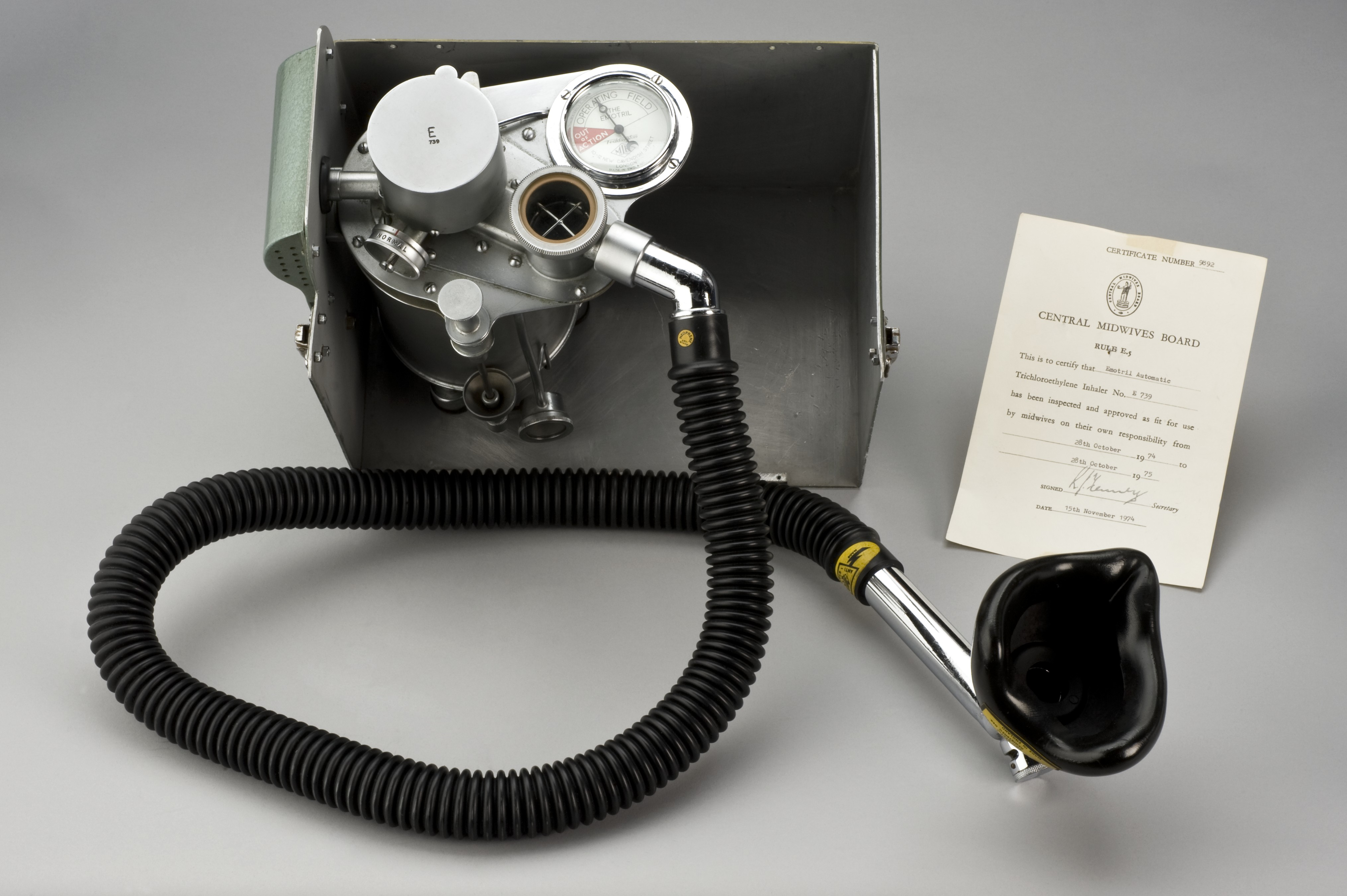
An Inhaler used for Trilene, 1961–1970

Pain Relief in Childbirth (1954)
- video icon

Anaesthetic use of trichloroethylene was banned in the United States in 1977 but the use in the United Kingdom remained until the late 1980s (especially for childbirth). Concerns about the carcinogenic potential of TCE led to its abandonment in developed countries by the 1980s and ICI had ceased medical grade TCE production by 1984. TCE was still in use as an anesthetic in some African countries as of 2000, and in Malawi and Nepal as of 2005.

== Production ==
Today, most trichloroethylene is produced from ethylene. First, ethylene is chlorinated over a ferric chloride catalyst to produce 1,2-dichloroethane:

CH_{2}=CH_{2} + Cl_{2} → ClCH_{2}CH_{2}Cl

When heated to around 400 °C with additional chlorine, 1,2-dichloroethane is converted to trichloroethylene:

ClCH_{2}CH_{2}Cl + 2 Cl_{2} → ClCH=CCl_{2} + 3 HCl

This reaction can be catalyzed by a variety of substances. The most commonly used catalyst is a mixture of potassium chloride and aluminum chloride. However, various forms of porous carbon can also be used. This reaction produces tetrachloroethylene as a byproduct and depending on the amount of chlorine fed to the reaction, tetrachloroethylene can even be the major product. Typically, trichloroethylene and tetrachloroethylene are collected together and then separated by distillation.

Prior to the early 1970s, however, most trichloroethylene was produced in a two-step process from acetylene. First, acetylene was treated with chlorine using a ferric chloride catalyst at 90 °C to produce 1,1,2,2-tetrachloroethane according to the chemical equation:

HC≡CH + 2 Cl_{2} → Cl_{2}CHCHCl_{2}

The 1,1,2,2-tetrachloroethane is then dehydrochlorinated to give trichloroethylene. This can be accomplished either with an aqueous solution of calcium hydroxide:

2 Cl_{2}CHCHCl_{2} + Ca(OH)_{2} → 2 ClCH=CCl_{2} + CaCl_{2} + 2 H_{2}O

or in the vapor phase by heating it to 300–500 °C on a barium chloride or calcium chloride catalyst:

Cl_{2}CHCHCl_{2} → ClCH=CCl_{2} + HCl

Common impurities in reagent and technical grade TCE are methyl chloroform, carbon tetrachloride, ethylene dichloride, tetrachloroethanes, benzene and phenol. However, these compounds are present in very small amounts and do not possess any risk.

== Uses ==
Trichloroethylene is an effective solvent for a variety of organic materials. It is mainly used for cleaning. Trichloroethylene is an active ingredient (solvent) in various printing ink, varnish and industrial paint formulations. Other uses include dyeing and finishing operations, adhesive formulations, rubber processing, adhesives, lacquers, and paint strippers. It is applied before plating, anodizing, and painting.

When trichloroethylene was first widely produced in the 1920s, its major use was to extract vegetable oils from plant materials such as soy, coconut, and palm. Other uses in the food industry included coffee decaffeination, and the preparation of flavoring extracts from hops and spices. TCE was used as a freezing point depressant in carbon tetrachloride fire extinguishers.

Trichloroethylene is also a chain terminator for polyvinyl chloride. Chlorination gives pentachloroethane.

=== Cleaning solvent ===
Perhaps the greatest use of TCE is as a cleaner and degreaser for metal parts. It has been widely used since the 1910s because of its low cost, low flammability, low toxicity, and high effectiveness as a solvent. The demand for TCE as a degreaser began to decline in the 1950s in favor of the less toxic 1,1,1-trichloroethane. However, 1,1,1-trichloroethane production has been phased out in most of the world under the terms of the Montreal Protocol enabled in 1989 due to its contribution to the ozone depletion. As a result, trichloroethylene has experienced some resurgence in use as a degreaser.

Trichloroethylene has been used as a dry cleaning solvent, although mostly replaced by tetrachloroethylene, except for spot cleaning – for grease and oil stains – where it is still often used under various tradenames. It was found unfavourable for dry cleaning because it tended to dissolve acetate dyes, which tetrachloroethylene did not. Trichloroethylene is used to remove grease and lanolin from wool before weaving.

TCE has also been used in the United States to clean kerosene-fueled rocket engines. During static firing, the RP-1 fuel would leave hydrocarbon deposits and vapors in the engine. These deposits had to be flushed from the engine to avoid the possibility of explosion during engine handling and future firing. TCE was used to flush the engine's fuel system immediately before and after each test firing by pumping TCE through the engine's fuel system and letting the solvent overflow for a period ranging from several seconds to 30–35 minutes, depending upon the engine. For some engines, the engine's gas generator and liquid oxygen (LOX) dome were also flushed with TCE before test firing. The F-1 rocket engine had its LOX dome, gas generator, and thrust chamber fuel jacket flushed with TCE during launch preparations.

=== Refrigerants ===
TCE is also used in the manufacture of a range of fluorocarbon refrigerants such as 1,1,1,2-tetrafluoroethane more commonly known as HFC-134a.

CHCl=CCl_{2} + 4 HF → CF_{3}CH_{2}F + 3 HCl

TCE was also used in industrial refrigeration applications due to its high heat transfer capabilities and its low-temperature specification.

== Reactions ==
Trichloroethylene reacts with alkalis to give dichloroacetylene via dehydrochlorination.

1,1,2,2-tetrachloroethylsulfenyl chloride, used in the production of captafol, is obtained from trichloroethylene and sulfur dichloride:

C_{2}HCl_{3} + SCl_{2} → C_{2}HCl_{4}SCl

The reaction of trichloroethylene with chloroform can yield different compounds depending on the catalyst used. If sodium hydroxide is used, chloroform is dehydrochlorinated to dichlorocarbene which adds to trichloroethylene, and pentachlorocyclopropane is obtained:

C_{2}HCl_{3} + :CCl_{2} → C_{3}HCl_{5}

The reaction of trichloroethylene with chloroform under the catalyst aluminum chloride gives 1,1,1,2,3,3-Hexachloropropane:

CHCl_{3} + C_{2}HCl_{3} → CHCl_{2}CHClCCl_{3}

The reaction of trichloroethylene with carbon tetrachloride under similar conditions gives 1,1,1,2,3,3,3-heptachloropropane:

C_{2}HCl_{3} + CCl_{4} → C_{3}HCl_{7}

== Safety ==
=== Chemical instability ===
Despite its widespread use as a metal degreaser, trichloroethylene itself is unstable in the presence of metal over prolonged exposure. As early as 1961 this phenomenon was recognized by the manufacturing industry when stabilizing additives were added to the commercial formulation. Since the reactive instability is accentuated by higher temperatures, the search for stabilizing additives was conducted by heating trichloroethylene to its boiling point under a reflux condenser and observing decomposition. Definitive documentation of 1,4-dioxane as a stabilizing agent for TCE is scant due to the lack of specificity in early patent literature describing TCE formulations. Epichlorohydrin, butylene oxide, N-methylpyrrole and ethyl acetate are common stabilisers for TCE, with epichlorohydrin being the most persistent and effective. Other chemical stabilizers include ketones such as methyl ethyl ketone.

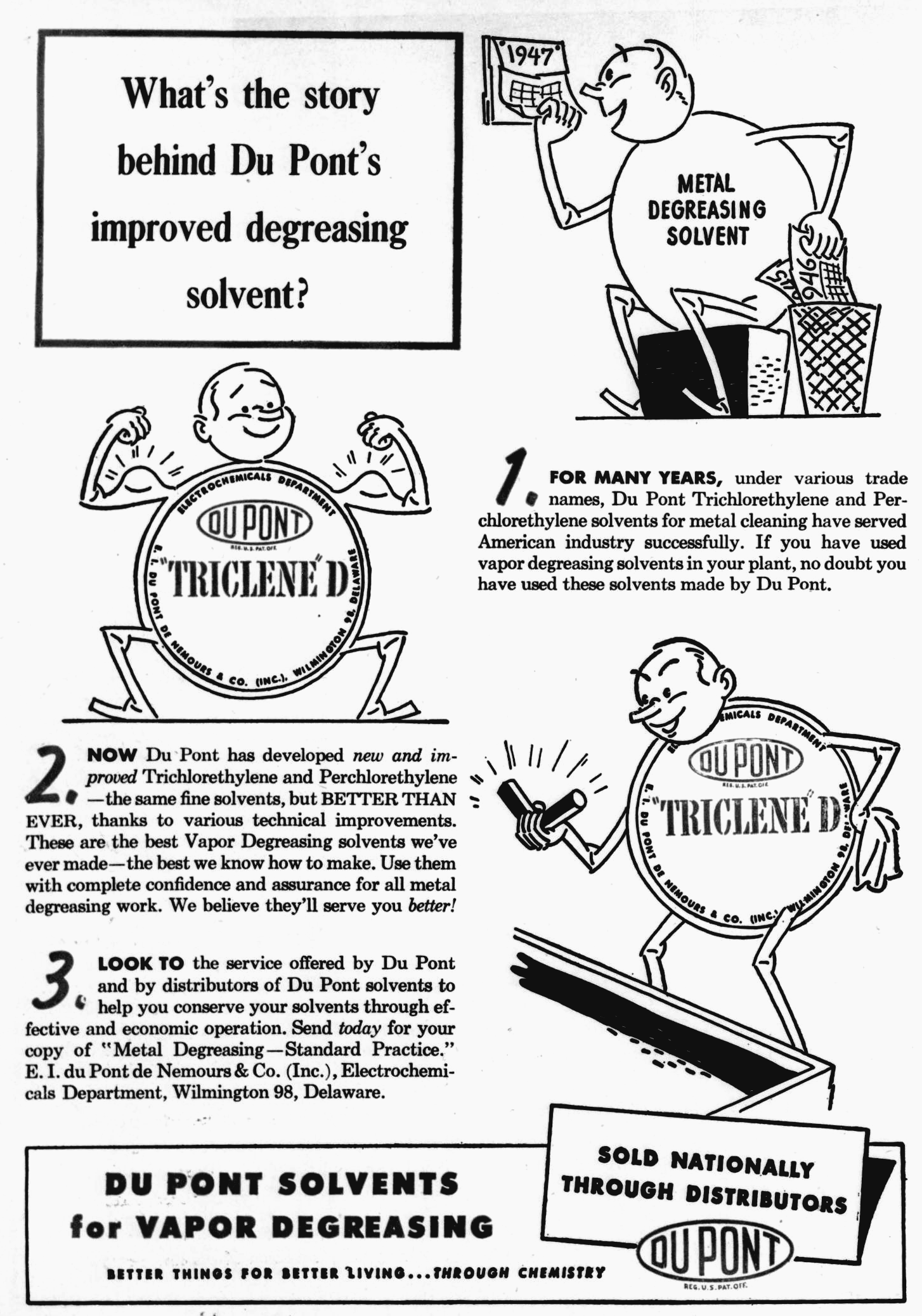
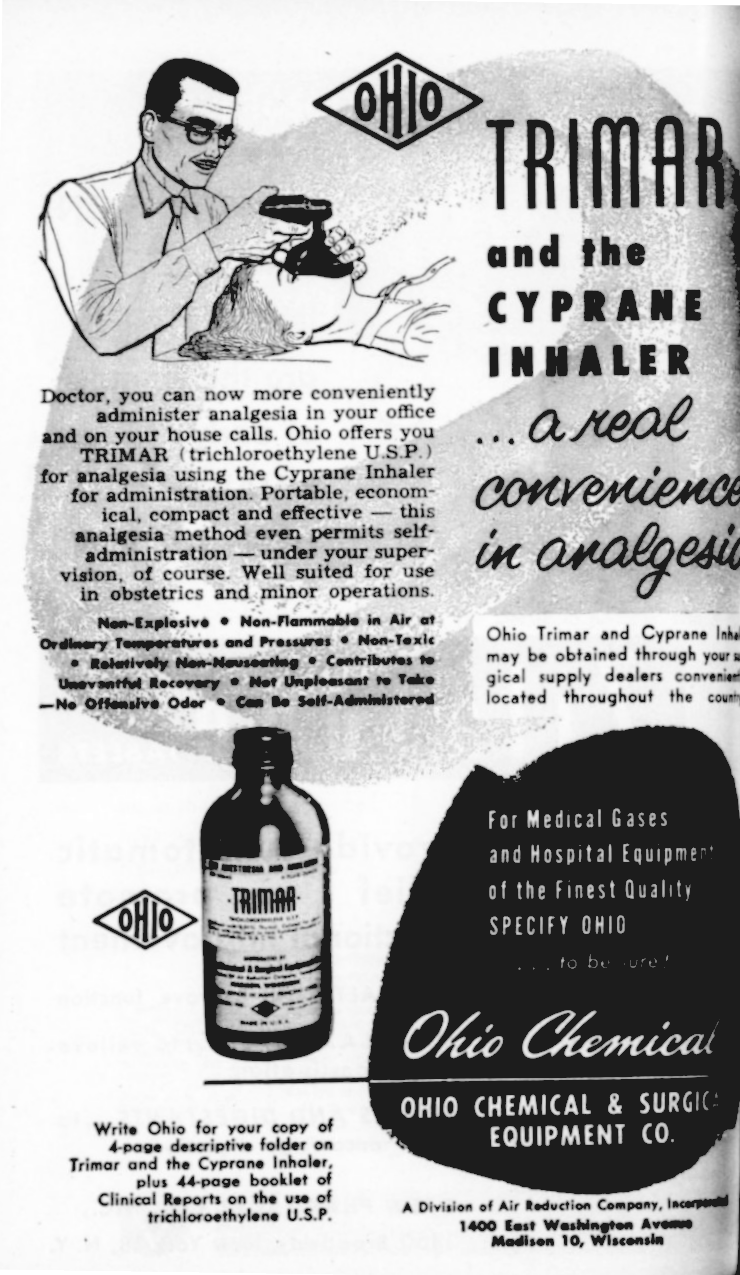
Two advertisements for trichloroethylene in two different uses, metal degreasing (1947) and anaesthesia (1952)

=== Physiological effects ===
==== Neurological ====
When inhaled, trichloroethylene produces central nervous system depression resulting in general anesthesia. These effects may be mediated by trichloroethylene acting as a positive allosteric modulator of inhibitory GABA_{A} and glycine receptors. Its high blood solubility results in a less desirable slower induction of anesthesia. At low concentrations, it is relatively non-irritating to the respiratory tract. Higher concentrations result in tachypnea. Many types of cardiac arrhythmias can occur and are exacerbated by epinephrine (adrenaline).

It was noted in the 1940s that TCE reacted with carbon dioxide (CO_{2}) absorbing systems (soda lime) to produce dichloroacetylene by dehydrochlorination and phosgene. Cranial nerve dysfunction (especially the fifth cranial nerve) was common when TCE anesthesia was given using CO_{2} absorbing systems. Muscle relaxation with TCE anesthesia sufficient for surgery was poor. For these reasons as well as problems with hepatotoxicity, TCE lost popularity in North America and Europe to more potent anesthetics such as halothane by the 1960s.

The symptoms of acute non-medical exposure are similar to those of alcohol intoxication, beginning with sleepiness, dizziness, and confusion and progressing with increasing exposure to unconsciousness. Much of what is known about the chronic human health effects of trichloroethylene is based on occupational exposures. Besides its effects on the central nervous system, industrial exposure to trichloroethylene is correlated with toxic effects in the liver and kidney.

Long-term industrial or ambient environmental exposure to trichloroethylene is suspected to elevate the risk of developing Parkinson's disease.

=== Carcinogenicity ===
Trichloroethylene has been classified as "Group 1: Carcinogenic to Humans" by the International Agency for Research on Cancer (IARC) due to sufficient evidence in humans and experimental animals for cancer of the kidney and a positive association between exposures to trichloroethylene and development of non-Hodgkin lymphoma and liver cancer in humans, and limited evidence in humans and experimental animals for increased incidence of leukemia, lymphoma, reproductive cancers, and respiratory cancers.

Epidemiologic research on exposed populations showed mixed results. For example, a research conducted on a group of 803 workers exposed to TCE in Denmark showed no overall increase in cancer incidence. Another research study on kidney cancer incidence in another group of exposed workers showed an increase. TCE was not found to be teratogenic in humans.

One review of the epidemiology of kidney cancer rated cigarette smoking and obesity as more important risk factors for kidney cancer than exposure to solvents such as trichloroethylene. In contrast, one overall assessment of human health risks associated with trichloroethylene states, "there is concordance between animal and human studies, which supports the conclusion that trichloroethylene is a potential kidney carcinogen". The evidence appears to be less certain in this study regarding the relationship between humans and liver cancer observed in mice, with the US NAS suggesting that low-level exposure might not represent a significant liver cancer risk in the general population.

=== Metabolism ===
Trichloroethylene is metabolised to trichloroepoxyethane (TCE oxide) which rapidly isomerises to trichloroacetaldehyde (chloral). Chloral hydrates to chloral hydrate in the body. Chloral hydrate is either reduced to 2,2,2-trichloroethanol or oxidised to trichloroacetic acid. Monochloroacetic acid, dichloroacetic acid and trichloromethane were also detected as minor metabolites of TCE.

=== Exposure and regulations ===
With a specific gravity greater than 1 (denser than water), trichloroethylene can be present as a dense non-aqueous phase liquid (DNAPL) if sufficient quantities are spilt in the environment.

The first known report of TCE in groundwater was given in 1949 by two English public chemists who described two separate instances of well contamination by industrial releases of TCE. Based on available federal and state surveys, between 9% and 34% of the drinking water supply sources tested in the US may have some TCE contamination, though EPA has reported that most water supplies comply with the maximum contaminant level (MCL) of 5 ppb.

Generally, atmospheric levels of TCE are highest in areas of concentrated industry and population. Atmospheric levels tend to be lowest in rural and remote regions. Average TCE concentrations measured in air across the United States are generally between 0.01 ppb and 0.3 ppb, although mean levels as high as 3.4 ppb have been reported. TCE levels in the low parts per billion range have been measured in food; however, levels as high as 140 ppb were measured in a few samples of food. TCE levels above background have been found in homes undergoing renovation.

==== Existing regulations ====
State, federal, and international agencies classify trichloroethylene as a known or probable carcinogen for humans. In 2014, the International Agency for Research on Cancer updated its classification of trichloroethylene to Group 1, indicating that sufficient evidence exists that it can cause cancer of the kidney in humans as well as some evidence of cancer of the liver and non-Hodgkin's lymphoma.

In the European Union, the Scientific Committee on Occupational Exposure Limit Values (SCOEL) recommends an exposure limit for workers exposed to trichloroethylene of 10 ppm (54.7 mg/m^{3}) for 8-hour TWA and of 30 ppm (164.1 mg/m^{3}) for STEL (15 minutes).

Existing EU legislation aimed at protection of workers against risks to their health (including Chemical Agents Directive 98/24/EC and Carcinogens Directive 2004/37/EC) currently do not impose binding minimum requirements for controlling risks to workers' health during the use phase or throughout the life cycle of trichloroethylene.

In 2023, the United States United States Environmental Protection Agency (EPA) determined that trichloroethylene presents a risk of injury to human health in various uses, including during manufacturing, processing, mixing, recycling, vapor degreasing, as a lubricant, adhesive, sealant, cleaning product, and spray. EPA states that TCE is "dangerous from both inhalation and dermal exposure and was most strongly associated with immunosuppressive effects for acute exposure, as well as autoimmune effects for chronic exposures." Chronic exposure to trichloroethylene has also been linked to an increased risk of Parkinson's disease by some researchers. As of June 1, 2023, two US states (Minnesota and New York) have acted on the EPA's findings and banned trichloroethylene in all cases but research and development.

According to the US EPA, in October 2023 it "proposed to ban the manufacture (including import), processing, and distribution in commerce of TCE for all uses, with longer compliance time frames and workplace controls (including an exposure limit) for some processing and industrial and commercial uses until the prohibitions come into effect" to "protect everyone including bystanders from the harmful health effects of TCE". Following the EPA's recommendation the Biden Administration announced a proposal to ban trichloroethylene later that month.

In December 2024 the EPA issued a final ruling on the regulation of trichloroethylene, with the rule taking effect on January 16, 2025. The rule bans the manufacture (including import), processing, and distribution in commerce of trichloroethylene for all uses, with longer compliance timeframes and stringent worker protections for some processing and industrial and commercial uses until the prohibitions come into effect. The EPA is prohibiting most uses of trichloroethylene within one year of the rule taking effect including manufacture and processing for most commercial and all consumer products, with only a limited number of commercial uses being allowed after January 16, 2026. These uses will eventually be phased out as well, though an exact timeframe hasn't been determined yet, but until they have been phased out more stringent worker protections will be required with a lower inhalation exposure limit for airborne trichloroethylene being put in place.

Many of the trichloroethylene uses that are continuing for longer than one year occur in highly industrialized settings with critical uses such as the cleaning of parts used in medical devices, aircraft & other transportation, security and defense systems and the manufacture of battery separators and refrigerants. These uses will ultimately be prohibited as well but are temporarily being allowed to continue in order to avoid negative impacts to national security or critical infrastructure, and to allow time to transition to alternative chemicals and methods.

== Remediation ==
Research has focused on the in-place remediation of trichloroethylene in soil and groundwater using potassium permanganate instead of removal for off-site treatment and disposal. Naturally occurring bacteria have been identified with the ability to degrade TCE. Dehalococcoides sp. degrade trichloroethylene by reductive dechlorination under anaerobic conditions. Under aerobic conditions, Pseudomonas fluorescens can co-metabolize TCE. Soil and groundwater contamination by TCE has also been successfully remediated by chemical treatment and extraction. The bacteria Nitrosomonas europaea can degrade a variety of halogenated compounds including trichloroethylene. Toluene dioxygenase has been reported to be involved in TCE degradation by Pseudomonas putida. In some cases, Xanthobacter autotrophicus can convert up to 51% of TCE to CO and CO_{2}.

== Society and culture ==
Trichloroethylene has been used as a recreational drug. Reported methods of TCE abuse include inhalation and drinking. It was abused for its euphoriant and slight hallucinogenic effect by mostly young people and workers who used the chemical. Some industrial workers had become addicted to TCE.

Groundwater and drinking water contamination from industrial discharge including trichloroethylene is a major concern for human health and has precipitated numerous incidents and lawsuits in the United States. One notable example is that of Woburn, Massachusetts, (Anderson v. Cryovac) where improper disposal of industrial solvents including trichloroethylene by local companies led to the contamination of two municipal wells. Families blamed the supposed local increase in leukemia cases on trichloroethylene pollution, although trichloroethylene does not cause leukemia in humans. The incident gained national attention in the 1980s and was the subject of extensive litigation, culminating in a settlement between the companies and affected families It later served as the basis for the book A Civil Action by Jonathan Harr, which was adapted to cinema in 1998.

== See also ==
- TaClo
