= Groundwater pollution =

Ground released seep into groundwater

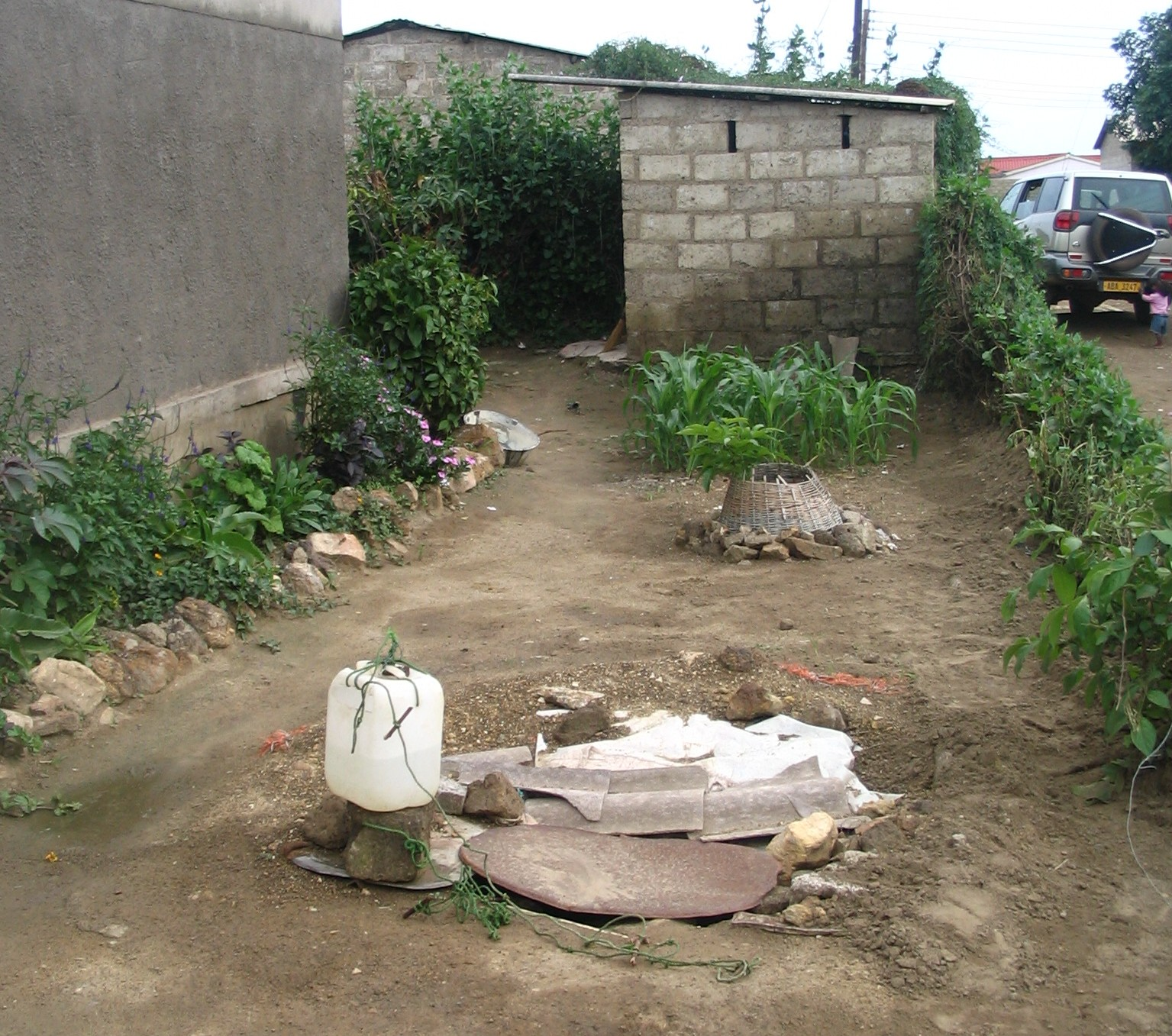
Groundwater pollution in Lusaka, Zambia, where the pit latrine in the background is polluting the shallow well in the foreground with pathogens and nitrate

Groundwater pollution (also called groundwater contamination) occurs when pollutants are released to the ground and make their way into groundwater. This type of water pollution can also occur naturally due to the presence of a minor and unwanted constituent, contaminant, or impurity in the groundwater, in which case it is more likely referred to as contamination rather than pollution. Groundwater pollution can occur from on-site sanitation systems, landfill leachate, effluent from wastewater treatment plants, leaking sewers, petrol filling stations, hydraulic fracturing (fracking), or from over application of fertilizers in agriculture. Pollution (or contamination) can also occur from naturally occurring contaminants, such as arsenic or fluoride. Using polluted groundwater causes hazards to public health through poisoning or the spread of disease (water-borne diseases).

The pollutant often produces a contaminant plume within an aquifer. Movement of water and dispersion within the aquifer spreads the pollutant over a wider area. Its advancing boundary, often called a plume edge, can intersect with groundwater wells and surface water, such as seeps and springs, making the water supplies unsafe for humans and wildlife. The movement of the plume, called a plume front, may be analyzed through a hydrological transport model or groundwater model. Analysis of groundwater pollution may focus on soil characteristics and site geology, hydrogeology, hydrology, and the nature of the contaminants. Different mechanisms have influence on the transport of pollutants, e.g. diffusion, adsorption, precipitation, decay, in the groundwater.

The interaction of groundwater contamination with surface waters is analyzed by use of hydrology transport models. Interactions between groundwater and surface water are complex. For example, many rivers and lakes are fed by groundwater. This means that damage to groundwater aquifers e.g. by fracking or over abstraction, could therefore affect the rivers and lakes that rely on it. Saltwater intrusion into coastal aquifers is an example of such interactions. Prevention methods include: applying the precautionary principle, groundwater quality monitoring, land zoning for groundwater protection, locating on-site sanitation systems correctly and applying legislation. When pollution has occurred, management approaches include point-of-use water treatment, groundwater remediation, or as a last resort, abandonment.

== Pollutant types ==
Contaminants found in groundwater cover a broad range of physical, inorganic chemical, organic chemical, bacteriological, and radioactive parameters. Principally, many of the same pollutants that play a role in surface water pollution may also be found in polluted groundwater, although their respective importance may differ.

=== Arsenic and fluoride ===
Arsenic and fluoride have been recognized by the World Health Organization (WHO) as the most serious inorganic contaminants in drinking-water on a worldwide basis.

Inorganic arsenic is the most common type of arsenic in soil and water. The metalloid arsenic can occur naturally in groundwater, as seen most frequently in Asia, including in China, India and Bangladesh. In the Ganges Plain of northern India and Bangladesh, severe contamination of groundwater by naturally occurring arsenic affects 25% of water wells in the shallower of two regional aquifers. Groundwater in these areas is also contaminated by the use of arsenic-based pesticides.

Arsenic in groundwater can also be present where there are mining operations or mine waste dumps that will leach arsenic.

Natural fluoride in groundwater is of growing concern as deeper groundwater is being used, "with more than 200 million people at risk of drinking water with elevated concentrations." Fluoride can especially be released from acidic volcanic rocks and dispersed volcanic ash when water hardness is low. High levels of fluoride in groundwater is a serious problem in the Argentinean Pampas, Chile, Mexico, India, Pakistan, the East African Rift, and some volcanic islands (Tenerife)

In areas that have naturally occurring high levels of fluoride in groundwater which is used for drinking water, both dental and skeletal fluorosis can be prevalent and severe.

=== Pathogens ===
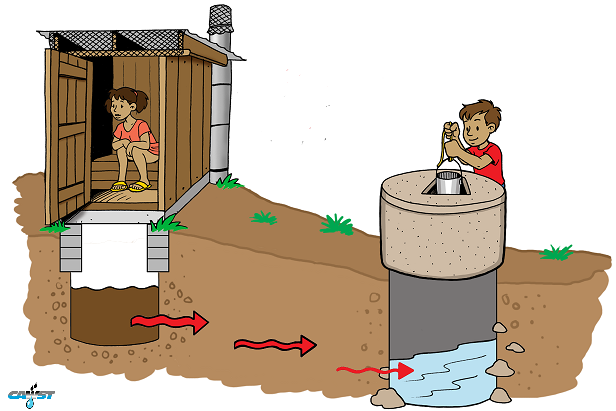
Waterborne diseases can be spread via a groundwater well which is contaminated with fecal pathogens from pit latrines.

The lack of proper sanitation measures, as well as improperly placed wells, can lead to drinking water contaminated with pathogens carried in feces and urine. Such fecal–oral transmitted diseases include typhoid, cholera and diarrhea. Of the four pathogen types that are present in feces (bacteria, viruses, protozoa, and helminths or helminth eggs), the first three can be commonly found in polluted groundwater, whereas the relatively large helminth eggs are usually filtered out by the soil matrix.

Deep, confined aquifers are usually considered the safest source of drinking water with respect to pathogens. Pathogens from treated or untreated wastewater can contaminate certain, especially shallow, aquifers.

=== Nitrate ===
Nitrate is the most common chemical contaminant in the world's groundwater and aquifers. In some low-income countries, nitrate levels in groundwater are extremely high, causing significant health problems. It is also stable (it does not degrade) under high oxygen conditions.

Elevated nitrate levels in groundwater can be caused by on-site sanitation, sewage sludge disposal and agricultural activities. It can therefore have an urban or agricultural origin.

Nitrate levels above 10 mg/L (10 ppm) in groundwater can cause "blue baby syndrome" (acquired methemoglobinemia). Drinking water quality standards in the European Union stipulate less than 50 mg/L for nitrate in drinking water.

The linkages between nitrates in drinking water and blue baby syndrome have been disputed in other studies. The syndrome outbreaks might be due to other factors than elevated nitrate concentrations in drinking water.

=== Organic compounds ===
Volatile organic compounds (VOCs) are a dangerous contaminant of groundwater. They are generally introduced to the environment through careless industrial practices. Many of these compounds were not known to be harmful until the late 1960s and it was some time before regular testing of groundwater identified these substances in drinking water sources.

Primary VOC pollutants found in groundwater include aromatic hydrocarbons such as BTEX compounds (benzene, toluene, ethylbenzene and xylenes), and chlorinated solvents including tetrachloroethylene (PCE), trichloroethylene (TCE), and vinyl chloride (VC). BTEX are important components of gasoline. PCE and TCE are industrial solvents used in dry cleaning processes and as a metal degreaser, respectively.

Other organic pollutants present in groundwater and derived from industrial operations are the polycyclic aromatic hydrocarbons (PAHs). Due to its molecular weight, naphthalene is the most soluble and mobile PAH found in groundwater, whereas benzo(a)pyrene is the most toxic one. PAHs are generally produced as byproducts by incomplete combustion of organic matter.

Organic pollutants can also be found in groundwater as insecticides and herbicides. As many other synthetic organic compounds, most pesticides have very complex molecular structures. This complexity determines the water solubility, adsorption capacity, and mobility of pesticides in the groundwater system. Thus, some types of pesticides are more mobile than others so they can more easily reach a drinking-water source.

=== Metals ===
Several trace metals occur naturally in certain rock formations and can enter in the environment from natural processes such as weathering. However, industrial activities such as mining, metallurgy, solid waste disposal, paint and enamel works, etc. can lead to elevated concentrations of toxic metals including lead, cadmium and chromium. These contaminants have the potential to make their way into groundwater.

The migration of metals (and metalloids) in groundwater will be affected by several factors, in particular by chemical reactions which determine the partitioning of contaminants among different phases and species. Thus, the mobility of metals primarily depends on the pH and redox state of groundwater.

=== Pharmaceuticals ===
Trace amounts of pharmaceuticals from treated wastewater infiltrating into the aquifer are among emerging ground-water contaminants being studied throughout the United States. Popular pharmaceuticals such as antibiotics, anti-inflammatories, antidepressants, decongestants, tranquilizers, etc. are normally found in treated wastewater. This wastewater is discharged from the treatment facility, and often makes its way into the aquifer or source of surface water used for drinking water.

Trace amounts of pharmaceuticals in both groundwater and surface water are far below what is considered dangerous or of concern in most areas, but it could be an increasing problem as population grows and more reclaimed wastewater is utilized for municipal water supplies.

=== Others ===
Other organic pollutants include a range of organohalides and other chemical compounds, petroleum hydrocarbons, various chemical compounds found in personal hygiene and cosmetic products, drug pollution involving pharmaceutical drugs and their metabolites. Inorganic pollutants might include other nutrients such as ammonia and phosphate, and radionuclides such as uranium (U) or radon (Rn) naturally present in some geological formations. Saltwater intrusion is also an example of natural contamination, but is very often intensified by human activities.

Groundwater pollution is a worldwide issue. A study of the groundwater quality of the principal aquifers of the United States conducted between 1991 and 2004, showed that 23% of domestic wells had contaminants at levels greater than human-health benchmarks. Another study suggested that the major groundwater pollution problems in Africa, considering the order of importance are: (1) nitrate pollution, (2) pathogenic agents, (3) organic pollution, (4) salinization, and (5) acid mine drainage.

== Causes ==
Causes of groundwater pollution include (further details below):

- Naturally occurring (geogenic)
- On-site sanitation systems
- Sewage and sewage sludge
- Fertilizers and pesticides
- Commercial and industrial leaks
- Hydraulic fracturing
- Landfill leachate
- Other

=== Naturally-occurring (geogenic) ===
"Geogenic" refers to naturally occurring as a result from geological processes.

The natural arsenic pollution occurs because aquifer sediments contain organic matter that generates anaerobic conditions in the aquifer. These conditions result in the microbial dissolution of iron oxides in the sediment and, thus, the release of the arsenic, normally strongly bound to iron oxides, into the water. As a consequence, arsenic-rich groundwater is often iron-rich, although secondary processes often obscure the association of dissolved arsenic and dissolved iron. Arsenic is found in groundwater most commonly as the reduced species arsenite and the oxidized species arsenate, the acute toxicity of arsenite being somewhat greater than that of arsenate. Investigations by WHO indicated that 20% of 25,000 boreholes tested in Bangladesh had arsenic concentrations exceeding 50 μg/L.

The occurrence of fluoride is close related to the abundance and solubility of fluoride-containing minerals such as fluorite (CaF_{2}). Considerably high concentrations of fluoride in groundwater are typically caused by a lack of calcium in the aquifer. Health problems associated with dental fluorosis may occur when fluoride concentrations in groundwater exceed 1.5 mg/L, which is the WHO guideline value since 1984.

The Swiss Federal Institute of Aquatic Science and Technology (EAWAG) has recently developed the interactive Groundwater Assessment Platform (GAP), where the geogenic risk of contamination in a given area can be estimated using geological, topographical and other environmental data without having to test samples from every single groundwater resource. This tool also allows the user to produce probability risk mapping for both arsenic and fluoride.

High concentrations of parameters like salinity, iron, manganese, uranium, radon and chromium, in groundwater, may also be of geogenic origin. This contaminants can be important locally but they are not as widespread as arsenic and fluoride.

=== On-site sanitation systems ===
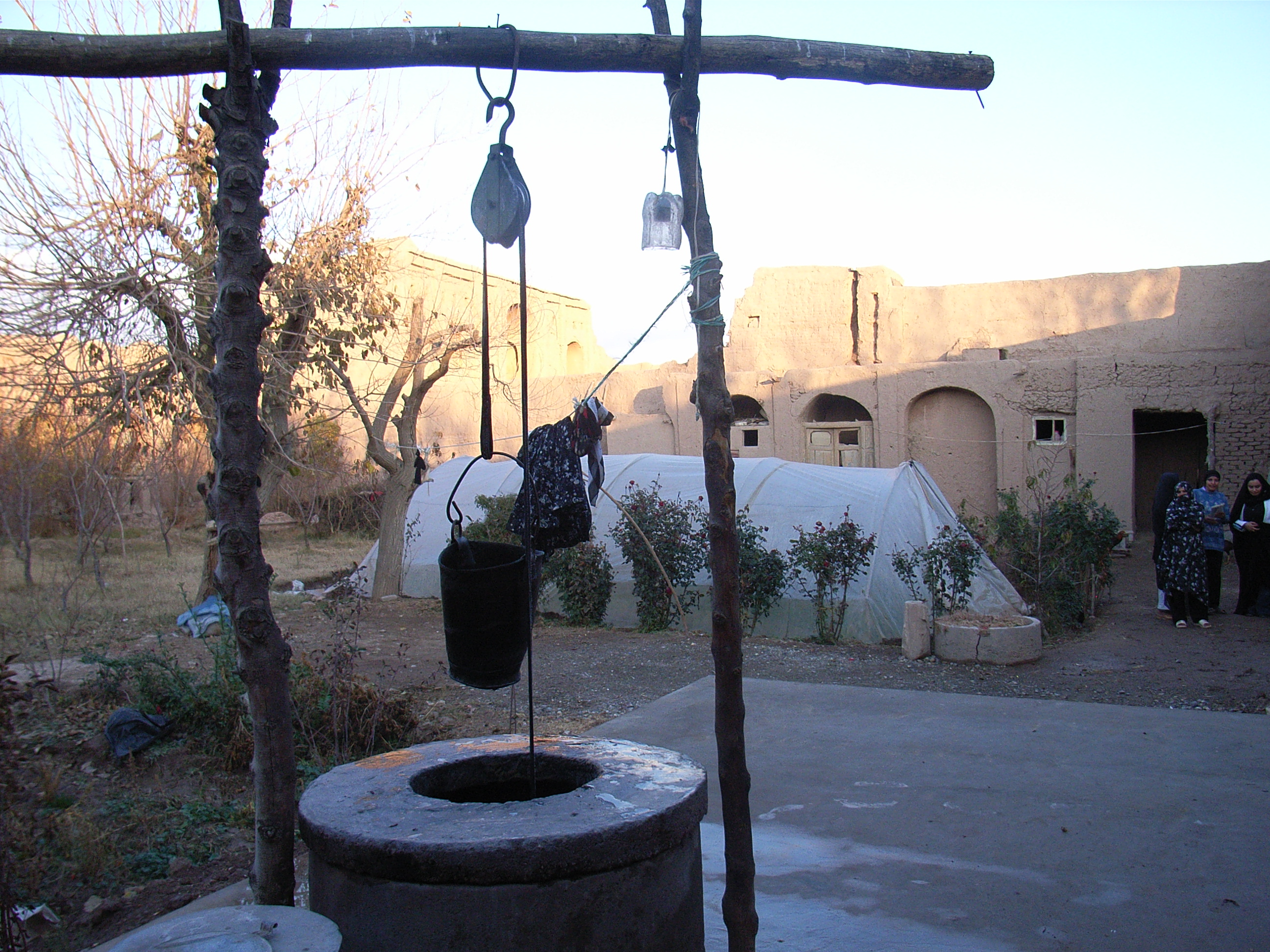
A traditional housing compound near Herat, Afghanistan, where a shallow water supply well (foreground) is in close proximity to the pit latrine (behind the white greenhouse) leading to contamination of the groundwater.

Groundwater pollution with pathogens and nitrate can also occur from the liquids infiltrating into the ground from on-site sanitation systems such as pit latrines and septic tanks, depending on the population density and the hydrogeological conditions.

Factors controlling the fate and transport of pathogens are quite complex and the interaction among them is not well understood. If the local hydrogeological conditions (which can vary within a space of a few square kilometers) are ignored, simple on-site sanitation infrastructures such as pit latrines can cause significant public health risks via contaminated groundwater.

Liquids leach from the pit and pass the unsaturated soil zone (which is not completely filled with water). Subsequently, these liquids from the pit enter the groundwater where they may lead to groundwater pollution. This is a problem if a nearby water well is used to supply groundwater for drinking water purposes. During the passage in the soil, pathogens can die off or be adsorbed significantly, mostly depending on the travel time between the pit and the well. Most, but not all pathogens die within 50 days of travel through the subsurface.

The degree of pathogen removal strongly varies with soil type, aquifer type, distance and other environmental factors. For example, the unsaturated zone becomes "washed" during extended periods of heavy rain, providing hydraulic pathway for the quick pass of pathogens. It is difficult to estimate the safe distance between a pit latrine or a septic tank and a water source. In any case, such recommendations about the safe distance are mostly ignored by those building pit latrines. In addition, household plots are of a limited size and therefore pit latrines are often built much closer to groundwater wells than what can be regarded as safe. This results in groundwater pollution and household members falling sick when using this groundwater as a source of drinking water.

=== Sewage and sewage sludge ===
Groundwater pollution can be caused by untreated waste discharge leading to diseases like skin lesions, bloody diarrhea and dermatitis. This is more common in locations having limited wastewater treatment infrastructure, or where there are systematic failures of the on-site sewage disposal system. Along with pathogens and nutrients, untreated sewage can also have an important load of heavy metals that may seep into the groundwater system.

The treated effluent from sewage treatment plants may also reach the aquifer if the effluent is infiltrated or discharged to local surface water bodies. Therefore, those substances that are not removed in conventional sewage treatment plants may reach the groundwater as well. For example, detected concentrations of pharmaceutical residues in groundwater were in the order of 50 mg/L in several locations in Germany. This is because in conventional sewage treatment plants, micropollutants such as hormones, pharmaceutical residues and other micropollutants contained in urine and feces are only partially removed and the remainder is discharged into surface water, from where it may also reach the groundwater.

Groundwater pollution can also occur from leaking sewers which has been observed for example in Germany. This can also lead to potential cross-contamination of drinking-water supplies.

Spreading wastewater or sewage sludge in agriculture may also be included as sources of fecal contamination in groundwater.

=== Fertilizers and pesticides ===
Nitrate can also enter the groundwater via excessive use of fertilizers, including manure spreading. This is because only a fraction of the nitrogen-based fertilizers is converted to produce and other plant matter. The remainder accumulates in the soil or lost as run-off. High application rates of nitrogen-containing fertilizers combined with the high water-solubility of nitrate leads to increased runoff into surface water as well as leaching into groundwater, thereby causing groundwater pollution. The excessive use of nitrogen-containing fertilizers (be they synthetic or natural) is particularly damaging, as much of the nitrogen that is not taken up by plants is transformed into nitrate which is easily leached.

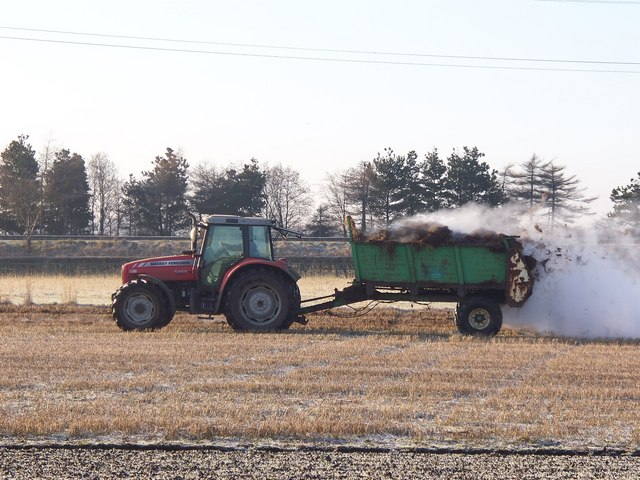
Poor management practices in manure spreading can introduce both pathogens and nutrients (nitrate) in the groundwater system.

The nutrients, especially nitrates, in fertilizers can cause problems for natural habitats and for human health if they are washed off soil into watercourses or leached through soil into groundwater. The heavy use of nitrogenous fertilizers in cropping systems is the largest contributor to anthropogenic nitrogen in groundwater worldwide.

Feedlots/animal corrals can also lead to the potential leaching of nitrogen and metals to groundwater. Over application of animal manure may also result in groundwater pollution with pharmaceutical residues derived from veterinary drugs.

The US Environmental Protection Agency (EPA) and the European Commission are seriously dealing with the nitrate problem related to agricultural development, as a major water supply problem that requires appropriate management and governance.

Runoff of pesticides may leach into groundwater causing human health problems from contaminated water wells. Pesticide concentrations found in groundwater are typically low, and often the regulatory human health-based limits exceeded are also very low. The organophosphorus insecticide monocrotophos (MCP) appears to be one of a few hazardous, persistent, soluble and mobile (it does not bind with minerals in soils) pesticides able to reach a drinking-water source. In general, more pesticide compounds are being detected as groundwater quality monitoring programs have become more extensive. However, much less monitoring has been conducted in developing countries due to the high analysis costs.

=== Commercial and industrial leaks ===
A wide variety of both inorganic and organic pollutants have been found in aquifers underlying commercial and industrial activities.

Ore mining and metal processing facilities are the primary responsible of the presence of metals in groundwater of anthropogenic origin, including arsenic. The low pH associated with acid mine drainage (AMD) contributes to the solubility of potential toxic metals that can eventually enter the groundwater system.

Oil spills associated with underground pipelines and tanks can release benzene and other soluble petroleum hydrocarbons that rapidly percolate down into the aquifer.

There is an increasing concern over the groundwater pollution by gasoline leaked from petroleum underground storage tanks (USTs) of gas stations. BTEX compounds are the most common additives of the gasoline. BTEX compounds, including benzene, have densities lower than water (1 g/mL). Similar to the oil spills on the sea, the non-miscible phase, referred to as Light Non-Aqueous Phase Liquid (LNAPL), will "float" upon the water table in the aquifer.

Chlorinated solvents are used in nearly any industrial practice where degreasing removers are required. PCE is a highly utilized solvent in the dry cleaning industry because of its cleaning effectiveness and relatively low cost. It has also been used for metal-degreasing operations. Because it is highly volatile, it is more frequently found in groundwater than in surface water. TCE has historically been used as a metal cleaning. The military facility Anniston Army Depot (ANAD) in the United States was placed on the EPA Superfund National Priorities List (NPL) because of groundwater contamination with as much as 27 million pounds of TCE. Both PCE and TCE may degrade to vinyl chloride (VC), the most toxic chlorinated hydrocarbon.

Many types of solvents may have also been disposed illegally, leaking over time to the groundwater system.

Chlorinated solvents such as PCE and TCE have densities higher than water and the non-miscible phase is referred to as Dense Non-Aqueous Phase Liquids (DNAPL). Once they reach the aquifer, they will "sink" and eventually accumulate on the top of low-permeability layers. Historically, wood-treating facilities have also release insecticides such as pentachlorophenol (PCP) and creosote into the environment, impacting the groundwater resources. PCP is a highly soluble and toxic obsolete pesticide recently listed in the Stockholm Convention on Persistent Organic Pollutants. PAHs and other semi-VOCs are the common contaminants associated with creosote.

Although non-miscible, both LNAPLs and DNAPLs still have the potential to slowly dissolve into the aqueous (miscible) phase to create a plume and thus become a long-term source of contamination. DNAPLs (chlorinated solvents, heavy PAHs, creosote, PCBs) tend to be difficult to manage as they can reside very deep in the groundwater system.

=== Hydraulic fracturing ===
The recent growth of hydraulic fracturing ("Fracking") wells in the United States has raised concerns regarding its potential risks of contaminating groundwater resources. EPA, along with many other researchers, has been delegated to study the relationship between hydraulic fracturing and drinking water resources. While it is possible to perform hydraulic fracturing without having a relevant impact on groundwater resources if stringent controls and quality management measures are in place, there are a number of cases where groundwater pollution due to improper handling or technical failures was observed.

While the EPA has not found significant evidence of a widespread, systematic impact on drinking water by hydraulic fracturing, this may be due to insufficient systematic pre- and post- hydraulic fracturing data on drinking water quality, and the presence of other agents of contamination that preclude the link between tight oil and shale gas extraction and its impact.

Despite the EPA's lack of profound widespread evidence, other researchers have made significant observations of rising groundwater contamination in close proximity to major shale oil/gas drilling sites located in Marcellus (British Columbia, Canada). Within one kilometer of these specific sites, a subset of shallow drinking water consistently showed higher concentration levels of methane, ethane, and propane concentrations than normal. An evaluation of higher Helium and other noble gas concentration along with the rise of hydrocarbon levels supports the distinction between hydraulic fracturing fugitive gas and naturally occurring "background" hydrocarbon content. This contamination is speculated to be the result of leaky, failing, or improperly installed gas well casings.

Furthermore, it is theorized that contamination could also result from the capillary migration of deep residual hyper-saline water and hydraulic fracturing fluid, slowly flowing through faults and fractures until finally making contact with groundwater resources; however, many researchers argue that the permeability of rocks overlying shale formations are too low to allow this to ever happen sufficiently. To ultimately prove this theory, there would have to be traces of toxic trihalomethanes (THM) since they are often associated with the presence of stray gas contamination, and typically co-occur with high halogen concentrations in hyper-saline waters. Besides, highly saline waters are a common natural feature in deep groundwater systems.

While conclusions regarding groundwater pollution as the result of hydraulic fracturing fluid flow is restricted in both space and time, researchers have hypothesized that the potential for systematic stray gas contamination depends mainly on the integrity of the shale oil/gas well structure, along with its relative geological location to local fracture systems that could potentially provide flow paths for fugitive gas migration.

Though widespread, systematic contamination by hydraulic fracturing has been heavily disputed, one major source of contamination that has the most consensus among researchers of being the most problematic is site-specific accidental spillage of hydraulic fracturing fluid and produced water. So far, a significant majority of groundwater contamination events are derived from surface-level anthropogenic routes rather than the subsurface flow from underlying shale formations. While the damage can be obvious, and much more effort is being done to prevent these accidents from occurring so frequently, the lack of data from fracking oil spills continue to leave researchers in the dark. In many of these events, the data acquired from the leakage or spillage is often very vague, and thus would lead researchers to lacking conclusions.

Researchers from the Federal Institute for Geosciences and Natural Resources (BGR) conducted a model study for a deep shale-gas formation in the North German Basin. They concluded that the probability is small that the rise of fracking fluids through the geological underground to the surface will impact shallow groundwater.

=== Landfill leachate ===
Leachate from sanitary landfills can lead to groundwater pollution. Chemicals can reach into ground water through precipitation and runoff. New landfills are required to be lined with clay or another synthetic material, along with leachate to protect surrounding ground water. However, older landfills do not have these measures and are often close to surface waters and in permeable soils. Closed landfills can still pose a threat to ground water if they are not capped by an impermeable material before closure to prevent leaking of contaminants.

Love Canal was one of the most widely known examples of groundwater pollution. In 1978, residents of the Love Canal neighborhood in upstate New York noticed high rates of cancer and an alarming number of birth defects. This was eventually traced to organic solvents and dioxins from an industrial landfill that the neighborhood had been built over and around, which had then infiltrated into the water supply and evaporated in basements to further contaminate the air. Eight hundred families were reimbursed for their homes and moved, after extensive legal battles and media coverage.

=== Over-pumping ===
Satellite data in the Mekong Delta in Vietnam have provided evidence that over-pumping of groundwater leads to land subsidence as well as consequential release of arsenic and possibly other heavy metals. Arsenic is found in clay strata due to their high surface area to volume ratio relative to sand-sized particles. Most pumped groundwater travels through sands and gravels with low arsenic concentration. However, during over-pumping, a high vertical gradient pulls water from less-permeable clays, thus promoting arsenic release into the water.

=== Other ===
Groundwater pollution can be caused by chemical spills from commercial or industrial operations, chemical spills occurring during transport (e.g. spillage of diesel fuels), illegal waste dumping, infiltration from urban runoff or mining operations, road salts, de-icing chemicals from airports and even atmospheric contaminants since groundwater is part of the hydrologic cycle.

Herbicide use can contribute to groundwater contamination through arsenic infiltration. Herbicides contribute to arsenic desorption through mobilization and transportation of the contaminant. Chlorinated herbicides exhibit a lower impact on arsenic desorption than phosphate type herbicides. This can help to prevent arsenic contamination through choosing herbicides appropriate for different concentrations of arsenic present in certain soils.

The burial of corpses and their subsequent degradation may also pose a risk of pollution to groundwater.

== Mechanisms ==
The passage of water through the subsurface can provide a reliable natural barrier to contamination but it only works under favorable conditions.

The stratigraphy of the area plays an important role in the transport of pollutants. An area can have layers of sandy soil, fractured bedrock, clay, or hardpan. Areas of karst topography on limestone bedrock are sometimes vulnerable to surface pollution from groundwater. Earthquake faults can also be entry routes for downward contaminant entry. Water table conditions are of great importance for drinking water supplies, agricultural irrigation, waste disposal (including nuclear waste), wildlife habitat, and other ecological issues.

Many chemicals undergo reactive decay or chemical change, especially over long periods of time in groundwater reservoirs. A noteworthy class of such chemicals is the chlorinated hydrocarbons such as trichloroethylene (used in industrial metal degreasing and electronics manufacturing) and tetrachloroethylene used in the dry cleaning industry. Both of these chemicals, which are thought to be carcinogens themselves, undergo partial decomposition reactions, leading to new hazardous chemicals (including dichloroethylene and vinyl chloride).

=== Interactions with surface water ===
Although interrelated, surface water and groundwater have often been studied and managed as separate resources. Interactions between groundwater and surface water are complex. Surface water seeps through the soil and becomes groundwater. Conversely, groundwater can also feed surface water sources. For example, many rivers and lakes are fed by groundwater. This means that damage to groundwater aquifers e.g. by fracking or over abstraction, could therefore affect the rivers and lakes that rely on it. Saltwater intrusion into coastal aquifers is an example of such interactions.

A spill or ongoing release of chemical or radionuclide contaminants into soil (located away from a surface water body) may not create point or non-point source pollution but can contaminate the aquifer below, creating a toxic plume. The movement of the plume, may be analyzed through a hydrological transport model or groundwater model.

== Prevention ==
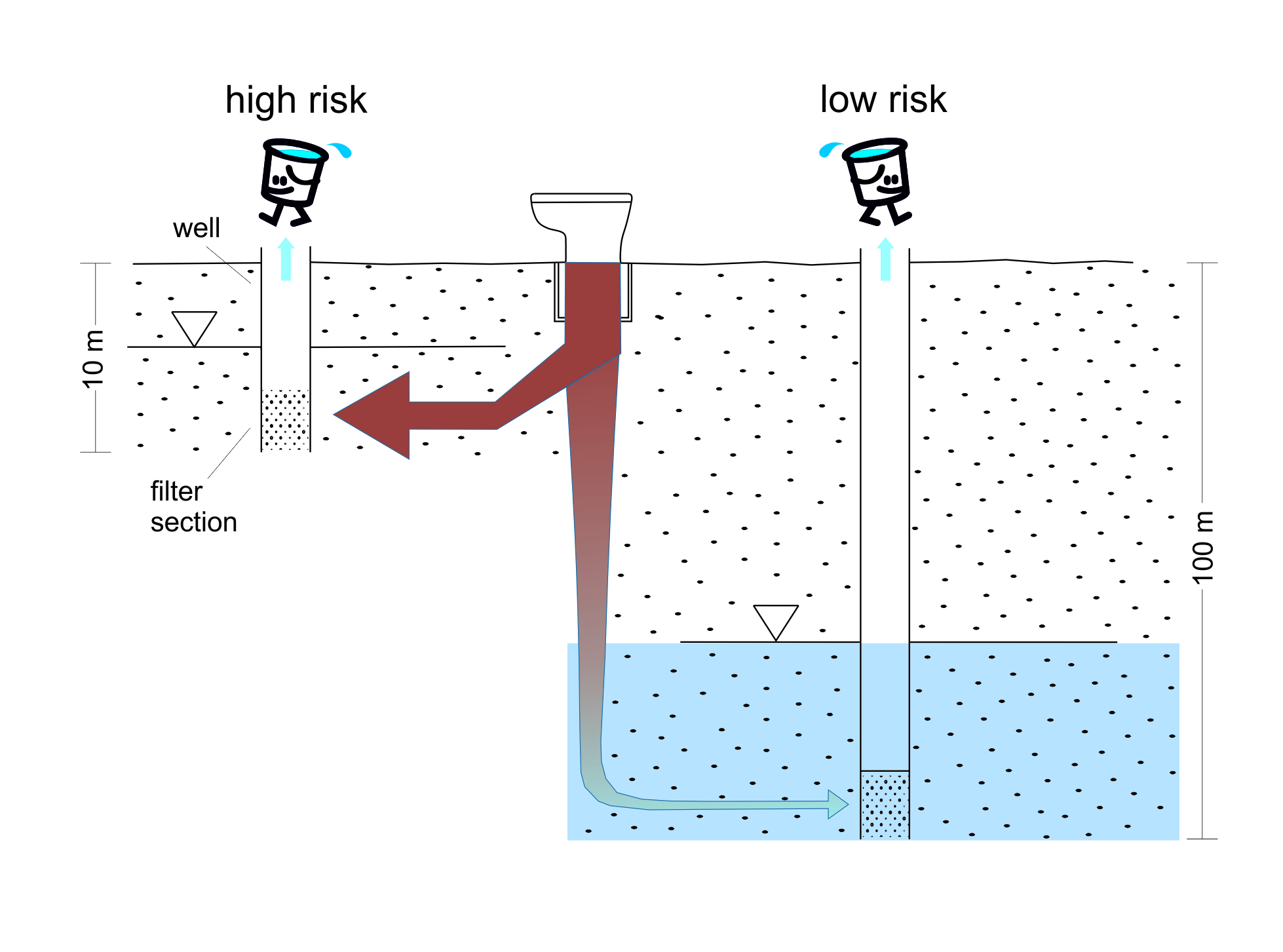
Schematic showing that there is a lower risk of groundwater pollution with greater depth of the water well

=== Precautionary principle ===
The precautionary principle, evolved from Principle 15 of the Rio Declaration on Environment and Development, is important in protecting groundwater resources from pollution. The precautionary principle provides that "where there are threats of irreversible damage, lack of full scientific certainty shall not be used as reason for postponing cost-effective measures to prevent environmental degradation."

One of the six basic principles of the European Union (EU) water policy is the application of the precautionary principle.

=== Groundwater quality monitoring ===
Groundwater quality monitoring programs have been implemented regularly in many countries around the world. They are important components to understand the hydrogeological system, and for the development of conceptual models and aquifer vulnerability maps.

Groundwater quality must be regularly monitored across the aquifer to determine trends. Effective groundwater monitoring should be driven by a specific objective, for example, a specific contaminant of concern. Contaminant levels can be compared to the World Health Organization (WHO) guidelines for drinking-water quality. It is not rare that limits of contaminants are reduced as more medical experience is gained.

Sufficient investment should be given to continue monitoring over the long term. When a problem is found, action should be taken to correct it. Waterborne outbreaks in the United States decreased with the introduction of more stringent monitoring (and treatment) requirements in the early 90s.

The community can also help monitor the groundwater quality.

Scientists have developed methods by which hazard maps could be produced for geogenic toxic substances in groundwater. This provides an efficient way of determining which wells should be tested.

=== Land zoning for groundwater protection ===
The development of land-use zoning maps has been implemented by several water authorities at different scales around the world. There are two types of zoning maps: aquifer vulnerability maps and source protection maps.

==== Aquifer vulnerability map ====
It refers to the intrinsic (or natural) vulnerability of a groundwater system to pollution. Intrinsically, some aquifers are more vulnerable to pollution than other aquifers. Shallow unconfined aquifers are more at risk of pollution because there are fewer layers to filter out contaminants.

The unsaturated zone can play an important role in retarding (and in some cases eliminating) pathogens and so must be considered when assessing aquifer vulnerability. The biological activity is greatest in the top soil layers where the attenuation of pathogens is generally most effective.

Preparation of the vulnerability maps typically involves overlaying several thematic maps of physical factors that have been selected to describe the aquifer vulnerability. The index-based parametric mapping method GOD developed by Foster and Hirata (1988) uses three generally available or readily estimated parameters, the degree of Groundwater hydraulic confinement, geological nature of the Overlying strata and Depth to groundwater. A further approach developed by EPA, a rating system named "DRASTIC", employs seven hydrogeological factors to develop an index of vulnerability: Depth to water table, net Recharge, Aquifer media, Soil media, Topography (slope), Impact on the vadose zone, and hydraulic Conductivity.

There is a particular debate among hydrogeologists as to whether aquifer vulnerability should be established in a general (intrinsic) way for all contaminants, or specifically for each pollutant.

==== Source protection map ====
It refers to the capture areas around an individual groundwater source, such as a water well or a spring, to especially protect them from pollution. Thus, potential sources of degradable pollutants, such as pathogens, can be located at distances which travel times along the flowpaths are long enough for the pollutant to be eliminated through filtration or adsorption.

Analytical methods using equations to define groundwater flow and contaminant transport are the most widely used. The WHPA is a semi-analytical groundwater flow simulation program developed by the US EPA for delineating capture zones in a wellhead protection area.

The simplest form of zoning employs fixed-distance methods where activities are excluded within a uniformly applied specified distance around abstraction points.

=== Locating on-site sanitation systems ===
As the health effects of most toxic chemicals arise after prolonged exposure, risk to health from chemicals is generally lower than that from pathogens. Thus, the quality of the source protection measures is an important component in controlling whether pathogens may be present in the final drinking-water.

On-site sanitation systems can be designed in such a way that groundwater pollution from these sanitation systems is prevented from occurring. Detailed guidelines have been developed to estimate safe distances to protect groundwater sources from pollution from on-site sanitation. The following criteria have been proposed for safe siting (i.e. deciding on the location) of on-site sanitation systems:

- Horizontal distance between the drinking water source and the sanitation system
  - Guideline values for horizontal separation distances between on-site sanitation systems and water sources vary widely (e.g. 15 to 100 m horizontal distance between pit latrine and groundwater wells)
- Vertical distance between drinking water well and sanitation system
- Aquifer type
- Groundwater flow direction
- Impermeable layers
- Slope and surface drainage
- Volume of leaking wastewater
- Superposition, i.e. the need to consider a larger planning area

As a very general guideline it is recommended that the bottom of the pit should be at least 2 m above groundwater level, and a minimum horizontal distance of 30 m between a pit and a water source is normally recommended to limit exposure to microbial contamination.^{[1]}However, no general statement should be made regarding the minimum lateral separation distances required to prevent contamination of a well from a pit latrine. For example, even 50 m lateral separation distance might not be sufficient in a strongly karstified system with a downgradient supply well or spring, while 10 m lateral separation distance is completely sufficient if there is a well developed clay cover layer and the annular space of the groundwater well is well sealed.

=== Legislation ===
Institutional and legal issues are critical in determining the success or failure of groundwater protection policies and strategies. In the United States the Resource Conservation and Recovery Act protects groundwater by regulating the disposal of solid waste and hazardous waste, and the Comprehensive Environmental Response, Compensation, and Liability Act, also known as "Superfund", requires remediation of abandoned hazardous waste sites.

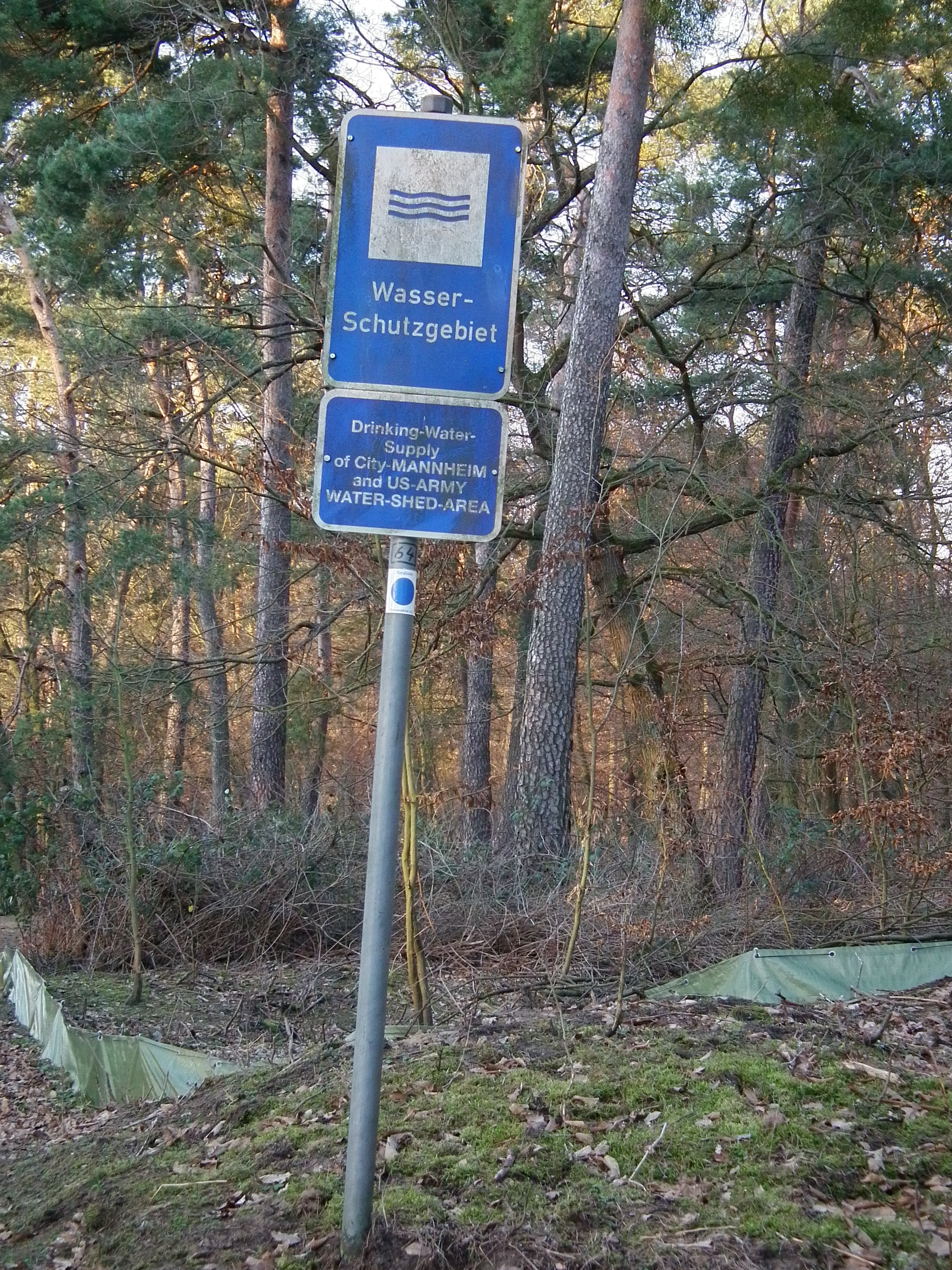
Sign near Mannheim, Germany, indicating a zone as a dedicated "groundwater protection zone".

== Management ==
Options for remediation of contaminated groundwater can be grouped into the following categories:

- containing the pollutants to prevent them from migrating further
- removing the pollutants from the aquifer
- remediating the aquifer by either immobilizing or detoxifying the contaminants while they are still in the aquifer (in-situ)
- treating the groundwater at its point of use
- abandoning the use of this aquifer's groundwater and finding an alternative source of water.

=== Point-of-use treatment ===
Portable water purification devices or "point-of-use" (POU) water treatment systems and field water disinfection techniques can be used to remove some forms of groundwater pollution prior to drinking, namely any fecal pollution. Many commercial portable water purification systems or chemical additives are available which can remove pathogens, chlorine, bad taste, odors, and heavy metals like lead and mercury.

Techniques include boiling, filtration, activated charcoal absorption, chemical disinfection, ultraviolet purification, ozone water disinfection, solar water disinfection, solar distillation, homemade water filters.

Arsenic removal filters (ARF) are dedicated technologies typically installed to remove arsenic. Many of these technologies require a capital investment and long-term maintenance. Filters in Bangladesh are usually abandoned by the users due to their high cost and complicated maintenance, which is also quite expensive.

=== Groundwater remediation ===
Groundwater pollution is much more difficult to abate than surface pollution because groundwater can move great distances through unseen aquifers. Non-porous aquifers such as clays partially purify water of bacteria by simple filtration (adsorption and absorption), dilution, and, in some cases, chemical reactions and biological activity; however, in some cases, the pollutants merely transform to soil contaminants. Groundwater that moves through open fractures and caverns is not filtered and can be transported as easily as surface water. In fact, this can be aggravated by the human tendency to use natural sinkholes as dumps in areas of karst topography.

Pollutants and contaminants can be removed from ground water by applying various techniques thereby making it safe for use. Ground water treatment (or remediation) techniques span biological, chemical, and physical treatment technologies. Most ground water treatment techniques utilize a combination of technologies. Some of the biological treatment techniques include bioaugmentation, bioventing, biosparging, bioslurping, and phytoremediation. Some chemical treatment techniques include ozone and oxygen gas injection, chemical precipitation, membrane separation, ion exchange, carbon absorption, aqueous chemical oxidation, and surfactant-enhanced recovery. Some chemical techniques may be implemented using nanomaterials. Physical treatment techniques include, but are not limited to, pump and treat, air sparging, and dual phase extraction.

=== Abandonment ===
If treatment or remediation of the polluted groundwater is deemed to be too difficult or expensive, then abandoning the use of this aquifer's groundwater and finding an alternative source of water is the only other option.

== Examples ==
=== Africa ===
==== Lusaka, Zambia ====
The peri-urban areas of Lusaka, the capital of Zambia, have ground conditions which are strongly karstified and for this reason – together with the increasing population density in these peri-urban areas – pollution of water wells from pit latrines is a major public health threat there.

==== Babati town, Tanzania ====
In Tanzania, many residents rely on groundwater sources, mainly from shallow on-site wells, for drinking and other domestic purposes. The cost of the official water supply has resulted in many households relying on private wells rather than Babati's urban water and sanitation facilities. The consumption of water from temporary water sources of unknown quality (mainly shallow wells) has resulted in large numbers of people suffering from water-borne diseases. In Tanzania, 23,900 children under the age of 5 are reported to die each year from dysentery and diarrhoea associated with drinking unsafe water.

=== Asia ===
==== India ====
The Ganga River Basin (GRB) which is a sacred body of water for the Hindus is facing severe arsenic contamination. India covers 79% of the GRB, and thus numerous states have been affected. Affected states include Uttarakhand, Uttar Pradesh, Delhi, Madhya Pradesh, Bihar, Jharkhand, Rajasthan, Chhattisgarh, Punjab, Haryana, and West Bengal. The arsenic levels are up to 4730 μg/L in the groundwater, ~1000 μg/L in irrigation water, and up to 3947 μg/kg in food materials all of which all exceed the United Nations Food and Agricultural Organization's standard for irrigation water and the World Health Organization's standards for drinking water. As a result, individuals who are exposed suffer from diseases that affect their dermal, neurological, reproductive and cognitive functioning, and can even result in cancer.

In India the government has proceeded to promote sanitation development in order to combat the rise in ground water contamination in several regions of the country. The effort has proved to show results and has decreased the groundwater pollution and has decreased the chance of sickness for mothers and children who were mainly affected by this issue. This was something greatly needed as according to the study, over 117,000 children under five die every year due to consuming polluted water. The countries effort has seen success in the more economically developed sections of the country.

=== North America ===
==== Hinkley, U.S. ====
The town of Hinkley, California (U.S.), had its groundwater contaminated with hexavalent chromium starting in 1952, resulting in a legal case against Pacific Gas & Electric (PG&E) and a multimillion-dollar settlement in 1996. The legal case was dramatized in the film Erin Brockovich, released in 2000.

==== San Joaquin, U.S. ====
Intensive pumping in San Joaquin county, California, has resulted in arsenic pollution. San Joaquin county has faced serious intensive pumping which has caused the ground below San Joaquin to sink and in turn damaged infrastructure. This intensive pumping into groundwater has allowed arsenic to move into groundwater aquifers which supply drinking water to at least a million residents and used in irrigation for crops in some of the richest farmland in the US. Aquifers are made up of sand and gravel that are separated by thin layers of clay which acts as a sponge that holds onto water and arsenic. When water is pumped intensively, the aquifer compresses and ground sinks which leads to the clay releasing arsenic. Study shows that aquifers contaminated as a result from over pumping, they can recover if withdrawals stop.

=== Norco, California ===
The town of Norco, California was affected by Trichloroethylene and Hydrazine groundwater contamination as a result of improper and negligent hazardous material handling and disposal practices from the Wyle Laboratories facility, which was located next to the Norco High School. Trichlorethylene levels were detected as high as 128 times higher than the states safe limit for drinking water and Hydrazine was found in 2 nearby wells.

The site is no longer in operation, and is an active hazmat cleanup site.

==== Walkerton, Canada ====
In the year 2000, groundwater pollution occurred in the small town of Walkerton, Canada leading to seven deaths in what is known as the Walkerton E. Coli outbreak. The water supply which was drawn from groundwater became contaminated with the highly dangerous O157:H7 strain of E. coli bacteria. This contamination was due to farm runoff into an adjacent water well that was vulnerable to groundwater pollution.
