= Senator Fumaroles =

- Interactive map of Senator Fumaroles
- Location: Nevada, United States
- Coordinates: 39°59′08″N 117°51′55″W
- Elevation: 3,858 ft (1,176 m)

The Senator Fumaroles are a group of two fumaroles in Churchill County of the U.S. state of Nevada. Both fumaroles are outgassing steam and hydrogen sulfide.
