= Bughole =

Construction term

A bughole (or pinhole) is a small hole in the surface of a concrete structure caused by the expansion and eventual outgassing of trapped pockets of air in setting concrete. Bugholes are undesirable, as they may compromise the structural integrity of concrete emplacements.

Bughole-induced outgassing is a phenomenon occurring when applying a protective coating (or lining) to concrete (predominantly vertically cast-in-place) where air becomes trapped within bughole cavities and releases into or through the protective coating, thereby causing pinholes and holidays in the coating film.
