= New car smell =

Common odor found in new cars

The new car smell is a scent that is commonly encountered in the interiors of new automobiles and other vehicles. The smell is caused by gases emitted from various manufactured materials, such as leather, plastics and textiles. Some people find the smell pleasant, which has led some automobile manufacturers to mimic the desired scents and utilize them to attract customers in show rooms. However, concerns have been raised about the potential health risks of the chemicals associated with new car smell. For example, a study in 2023 found that formaldehyde and acetaldehyde gases exceeded Chinese government safety standards in new car interiors, and researchers recommended that new car owners drive with windows open.

== Chemical composition ==
Both the scent and its origins vary among different kinds of cars, depending on the materials found in the interior—for example, leather versus cloth seats. Typically, however, most of the interior of an automobile consists of plastic held together with a number of adhesives and sealers, and such materials are known to release volatile organic compounds via off-gassing. These fumes are generally attributed to mixtures of many different gases as well as plasticizers, (although DEHP, widely used in PVC, is not very volatile).

Researchers tested more than 200 U.S. vehicles of model years 2011–2012 for chemicals such as organobromine compounds (associated with brominated flame retardants, or BFRs), organochlorine compounds (e.g., polyvinyl chloride, or PVC), and heavy metals that off-gas from various parts such as the steering wheel, dashboard, armrests, and seats.

It is recommended to keep new cars well-ventilated while driving, especially during the summer. A 1995 analysis of the air from a new Lincoln Continental found over 50 volatile organic compounds, which were identified as coming from sources such as cleaning and lubricating compounds, paint, carpeting, leather and vinyl treatments, latex glue, and gasoline and exhaust fumes. An analysis two months after the initial one found a significant reduction in the chemicals. The researchers observed that the potential toxicity of many of these compounds could pose a danger to human health.

In a 2005 study, over sixty chemical compounds were identified inside the interiors of four tested vehicles, with the total volatile organic compound levels in one vehicle reaching 7,500 micrograms per cubic meter. Concentrations decayed by approximately 90% over a three-week period.

In some instances, the odor results from a manufacturing defect. According to official documents of Bentley Motors (BT26), an "obnoxious odor" in Bentley cars for model years 1999–2002 was traced to a rust inhibitor. In some cultures, e.g. the Chinese culture, the new car smell is not considered desirable and manufacturers work to eliminate it.

== Artificial recreation ==
Although the characteristic new car smell is primarily the result of off-gassing from interior materials, automobile dealerships and professional detailers commonly apply commercial fragrance products designed to mimic or enhance the scent. These products are used on both used vehicles (to recreate a sense of newness) and sometimes on new vehicles for consistency.

The products are typically sold as aerosol sprays, single-use cabin foggers, gels, or liquid concentrates. Common application methods include spraying interior surfaces or activating a self-dispensing fogger inside a closed vehicle with the air-conditioning system set to recirculate.

One long-established product is Ozium. Originally formulated in the 1940s as an air sanitizer, it later became widely used by dealerships and detailers. Cans of the product have been marketed with the phrase “That New Car Smell.” According to a 2003 report in Car and Driver, dealerships use Ozium to freshen used cars and detailers also employ it for the same purpose. Other commercial formulations marketed as “new car smell” or “new car scent” include products from Chemical Guys and Meguiar’s.

These artificial scents are fragrance compositions intended to approximate the chemical notes associated with new plastics, vinyl, adhesives, and treated leather. They generally consist of blended synthetic aroma chemicals in a carrier solvent or propellant, sometimes combined with odor-neutralizing agents. They do not replicate the exact mixture of volatile organic compounds released by factory materials.

Many used-car dealers apply such scents as part of vehicle preparation.

== Health hazards ==
The chemicals responsible for new car smell may pose health risks to the occupants of new vehicles.

A two-year study released in 2001 by the CSIRO in Australia found several health problems associated with these chemicals. CSIRO research scientist, Dr. Stephen Brown, reported anecdotal accounts of disorientation, headache, and irritation in some drivers of new cars. He measured pollutant levels in new cars that were sufficient to cause similar effects within minutes in controlled experiments by other researchers. Chemicals found in the cars included the carcinogen benzene, two other possible carcinogens cyclohexanone and styrene, and several other toxic chemicals.

A more recent study in Japan found that the volatile organic chemicals in a new minivan were over 35 times the health limit the day after its delivery. After four months, levels had fallen under the limit, but they increased again in the hot summer months, taking three years to permanently remain below the limit. The limits were set by the Japanese health ministry in response to more car owners suffering from sick building syndrome. A Daily Telegraph article on the study described the enjoyment of new car smell as "akin to glue-sniffing".

The most common side effects of the new car smell are headaches, sore throats, nausea, and drowsiness.

=== Other studies ===
However, a study in 2007 showed no toxicity from new car odors in lab grown cells, though odors did trigger an immune system reaction.

== See also ==
- Indoor air quality
- Sensory branding
