= VOC contamination of groundwater =

Volatile Organic Compounds (VOCs) are dangerous contaminants of groundwater, leading to groundwater pollution. They are generally introduced to the environment through careless industrial practices.

== Overview ==
VOCs are responsible for a number of adverse health effects, especially for nursing and pregnant mothers. Many of these compounds were not known to be harmful until the late 1960s, and it was some time before regular testing of groundwater identified these substances in drinking water sources.

== Specific VOCs ==
=== PCE ===
Tetrachloroethylene is used in metal degreasing and dry cleaning. It is suspected to cause cancer and a host of other health problems.

=== TCE ===
Trichloroethylene is used in cleaning metal parts and was widely believed to be harmless before being linked to birth defects. It is suspected to cause cancer and a host of other health problems.

=== Toluene ===
Toluene is an organic compound that is mostly harmless to adults and is sometimes abused as an inhalant. Fetal toluene syndrome has been defined and resembles fetal alcohol syndrome with resultant birth defects, but the U.S. Centers for Disease Control and Prevention have identified differentiating features between the two syndromes including FTS having the additional facial features of micrognathia, large anterior fontanel, down-turned mouth corners, hair patterning abnormalities, bifrontal narrowing of the face, and ear abnormalities.

== History ==
=== Camp Lejeune ===
U.S. Marine Corps Base Camp Lejeune was built near Jacksonville, North Carolina in 1942. In 1982, the Marine Corps discovered volatile organic compounds (VOCs) in several drinking water wells that fed into two of the eight water systems. The sources were traced to tetrachloroethylene (PCE) from two dry cleaners – one on base, the other off the base, and trichloroethylene which had been used in vehicle maintenance on the basis. These problems were addressed, but concerns remained regarding nursing and pregnant mothers who may have been previously exposed. It was not until the late 1990s that the federal government tried to track down people who may have been exposed.

=== Love Canal ===
Love Canal was an abandoned canal near Niagara Falls, New York which was used by the U.S. military and Occidental Petroleum as a chemical waste dumping ground. Numerous cases of cancer and birth defects were found from the 1950s to the 1970s. The primary VOC at Love Canal is toluene, which is found along with dioxins and other pollutants.

=== Valley of the Drums ===
The Valley of the Drums is a 23-acre (93,000 m^{2}) toxic waste site in northern Bullitt County, Kentucky, near Louisville, named after the waste-containing drums strewn across the area. Contaminants include xylene, methyl ethyl ketone, methylene chloride, acetone, phthalates, anthracene, toluene, fluoranthene, alkyl benzene, vinyl chloride, dichloroethylene, and aliphatic acids.

It is known as one of the primary motivations for the passage of the Comprehensive Environmental Response, Compensation, and Liability Act, or Superfund Act of 1980.

== See also ==
- Groundwater pollution
- Water quality
