= Marcellus natural gas trend =

Natural gas extraction area in the United States

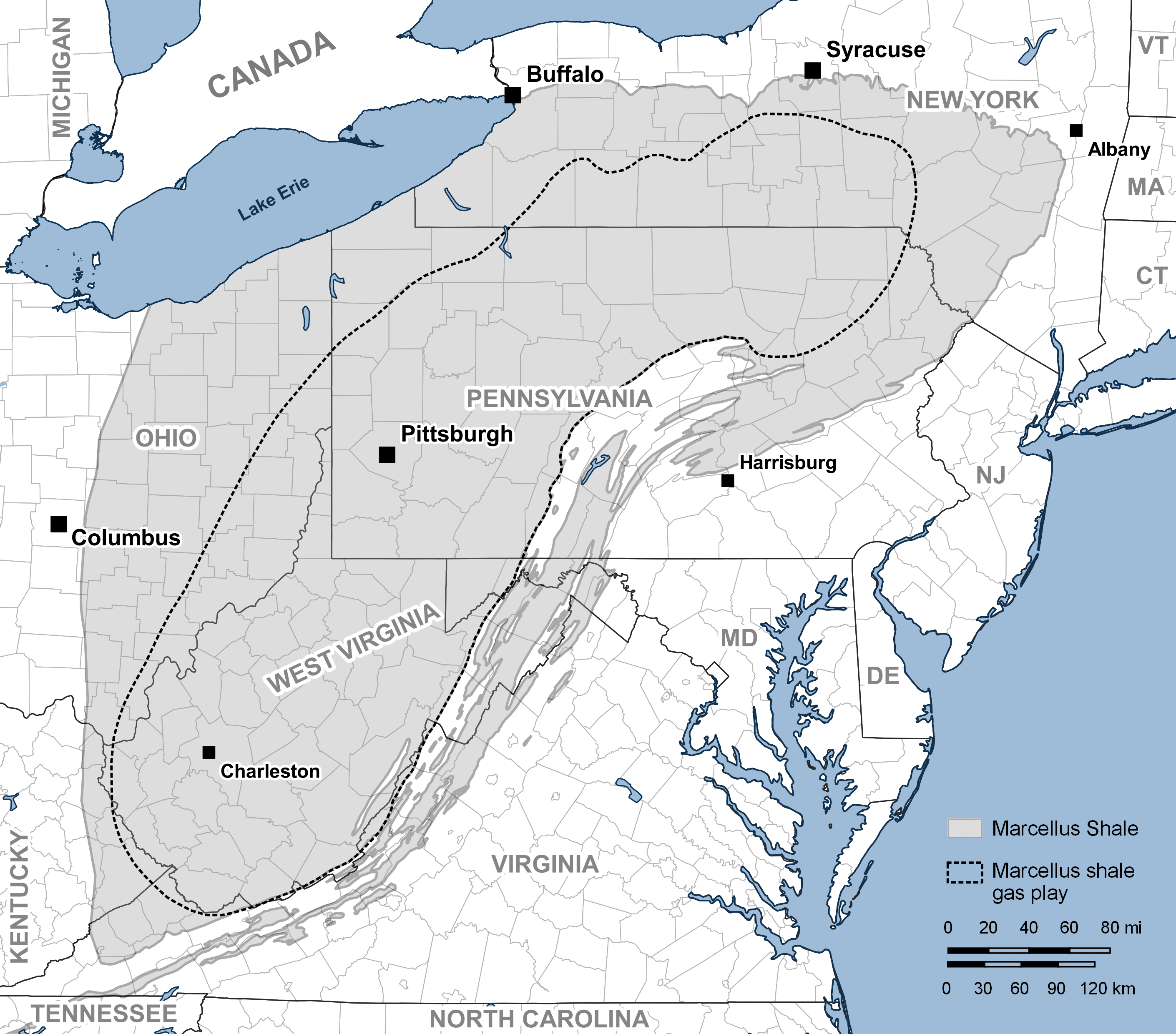
Extent of Marcellus Shale

The Marcellus natural gas trend is a large geographic area of prolific shale gas extraction from the Marcellus Shale or Marcellus Formation, of Devonian age, in the eastern United States. The shale play encompasses 104,000 square miles and stretches across Pennsylvania and West Virginia, and into eastern Ohio and western New York. In 2012, it was the largest source of natural gas in the United States, and production was still growing rapidly in 2013. The natural gas is trapped in low-permeability shale, and requires the well completion method of hydraulic fracturing to allow the gas to flow to the well bore. The surge in drilling activity in the Marcellus Shale since 2008 has generated both economic benefits and considerable controversy.

Although before 2008 the Marcellus Shale was considered to have inconsequential natural gas potential, it is now believed to hold the largest volume of recoverable natural gas in the United States. In 2011, the U.S. Geological Survey estimated that the Marcellus Shale contained 42.954 to 144.145 trillion cubic feet (TCF) of undiscovered, technically recoverable natural gas; the USGS upgraded its estimate to 214 TCF in 2019. The speculated total volume of the Marcellus field is even greater; Chesapeake Energy places its estimate at 410 TCF of shale gas. In September 2012, the Marcellus Shale overtook the Haynesville Shale of northwest Louisiana as the leading producer of both shale gas and overall natural gas in the United States. In February 2014, Marcellus gas wells produced 14.0 billion cubic feet per day (BFCD), a 42 percent increase over the year previous, and comprising 21 percent of all the dry gas produced that month in the United States; this increased to 14.4 BCFD and 36% of all shale gas nationwide in 2015. By 2018, production had grown further from an average of 19.4 BCFD and reached more than 21 BCFD in December 2018. This increase in production, from the most productive basin in the U.S., has been a major contributor to the significant decline in price for natural gas but continued investment of production appears to be waning in the face of price weakness

== Geological formation ==
The impervious limestone layers of the Onondaga directly below the Marcellus, and the Tully Limestone at the top of the Hamilton Group, have trapped valuable natural gas reserves in this formation. The gas is produced by thermogenic decomposition of organic materials in the sediments under the high temperature and pressure generated after the formation was buried deep below the surface of the earth. The rock holds most of the gas in the pore spaces of the shale, with vertical fractures or joints providing additional storage as well as pathways for the gas to flow; gas is also adsorbed on mineral grains, and the carbon in the shale.

== Development history ==
Gas production from the Marcellus Shale

The industry was long aware there was gas in the Marcellus, but it "occurred in pockets and flows that could not be sustained to make a well." Before 2000, some low production gas wells were completed to the Marcellus, but these had a low rate of return and a relatively long capital recovery period. There are wells in Tioga and Broome County, New York which are 50 years old or more.

From 1976 to 1992, the U.S. Department of Energy funded the Eastern Gas Shales Project, which studied many eastern shale formations. The project drilled and cored five wells in the Marcellus in Pennsylvania. The cores established that there were enormous amounts of gas in the Marcellus, and defined fracture directions that were used in later Marcellus well drilling. Although the great volumes of trapped gas found by the project in the Marcellus and other eastern shales created excitement, the project was less successful at finding ways to recover the gas economically during the low gas prices of the 1980s.

Range Resources drilled an unsuccessful well to the Oriskany Sandstone in 2003. Hoping to save some value by finding producible gas in the shallower formations in the wellbore, Range geologists noted that the Marcellus Formation had some of the same properties as the Barnett Shale of North Texas, which was a prolific source of gas. In late 2004 Range completed the well in the Marcellus, using hydraulic fracturing techniques developed for the Barnett, and started producing the well in 2005.

To extract the shale gas at more commercially viable rates, directional drilling is done to depths of 7,000 to 10,000 ft (2,100 to 3,000 m) underground to reach the formation, and then water and a mixture of chemicals is pumped into the rock under high pressure in a process known as hydraulic fracturing to release the gas from the low permeability shale. Drilling horizontally through the Marcellus shale perpendicular to the vertical fractures better connected the natural pathways for gas flow. Early results show that horizontal wells in this formation are producing gas at a rate more than double that of vertical wells, and at slightly lower cost overall, despite the much higher initial cost of drilling. Since parts of this region have been producing gas from wells drilled to the deeper Oriskany Formation sandstone, older wells that are no longer viable can be reused, either by fracturing the Marcellus layer in the existing well bore, or by refinishing the bore using horizontal drilling into the Marcellus. Re-use of the existing infrastructure has both environmental as well as economic benefits, because in addition to avoiding development of new drilling sites and wells, existing transportation facilities can be reused.

By 2008 the Marcellus Formation had become the focus of shale gas development, starting in Pennsylvania. Leasing agents aggressively sought out acreages to lease mineral rights in Pennsylvania. The price for leasing rose from $300 per acre in February to $2,100 in April, 2008. Only four Marcellus wells were drilled in Pennsylvania in 2005, but by 2010 1,446 Marcellus wells were drilled in Pennsylvania.

In 2010, Range Resources was the first company to voluntarily disclose the chemicals used at each of their fracking sites. Early experiments in Mount Pleasant Township led to lengthy legal battles over pollution of well water and air. Range Resources spokesperson claimed that more than 2,100 Marcellus wells had been drilled in Pennsylvania by 2010 and at that time of there were "thousands of landowners across the state who have signed leases allowing gas companies to produce on or under their properties" who had not complained and "numerous happy landowners among the hundreds of Range leaseholders in Washington County... are enjoying the economic benefits".

=== Mergers and acquisitions ===
In November 2008, Chesapeake Energy, which held 1.8 million net acres of oil and gas leases in the Marcellus trend, sold a 32.5% interest in its leases to Statoil of Norway, for $3.375 billion.

Royal Dutch Shell's $4.7 billion acquisition of East Resources in 2010, with acreage in four Marcellus states, stood out amongst a flurry of acquisitions.

=== Infrastructure ===
Building for infrastructure projects was reported in West Virginia, Pennsylvania, and Ohio to accommodate the growth during 2008–2009, including for pipeline and water treatment services.

In 2010, Warren, Ohio's water treatment facility announced plans to become the first in the state to accept waste water from shale drilling, while at the 2010 Marcellus Summit in State College, Pennsylvania, state officials announced they were working with local officials on bonding issues for new infrastructure. In August 2010, Kinder Morgan announced plans to construct a 230-240 mile-long underground pipeline, which would transport recovered natural gas supplies in Western Pennsylvania from West Virginia to Toledo, ultimately connecting with existing pipelines in Michigan and Southern Ontario. The project, named the Rover Pipeline, has had numerous spills during its construction process. The Ohio Environmental Protection Agency has fined the company for over $2.3 million in damages, but the fines have yet to be paid.

Several pipeline projects completed in 2013 carry Marcellus gas to New York and New Jersey, and were expected to result in lower gas prices to consumers in those areas. The Algonquin Incremental Market and Salem Lateral pipeline extensions will carry natural gas from the Marcellus into New England where consumer natural gas prices are higher.

The Atlantic Coast Pipeline is a 600 miles (970 km) pipeline that is planned to enter service in 2019 and will draw gas from the Marcellus formation in West Virginia and run south to North Carolina.

== Estimates of resources and reserves ==
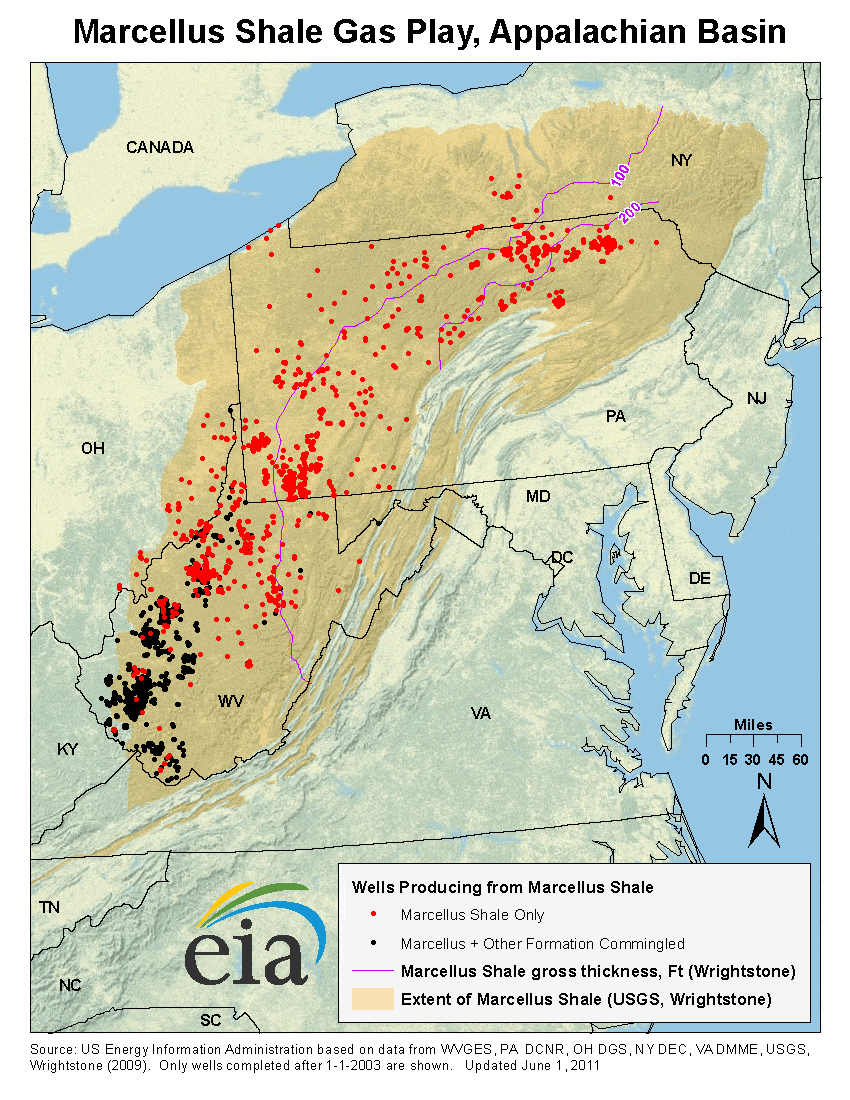
Producing gas wells in the Marcellus Shale gas play

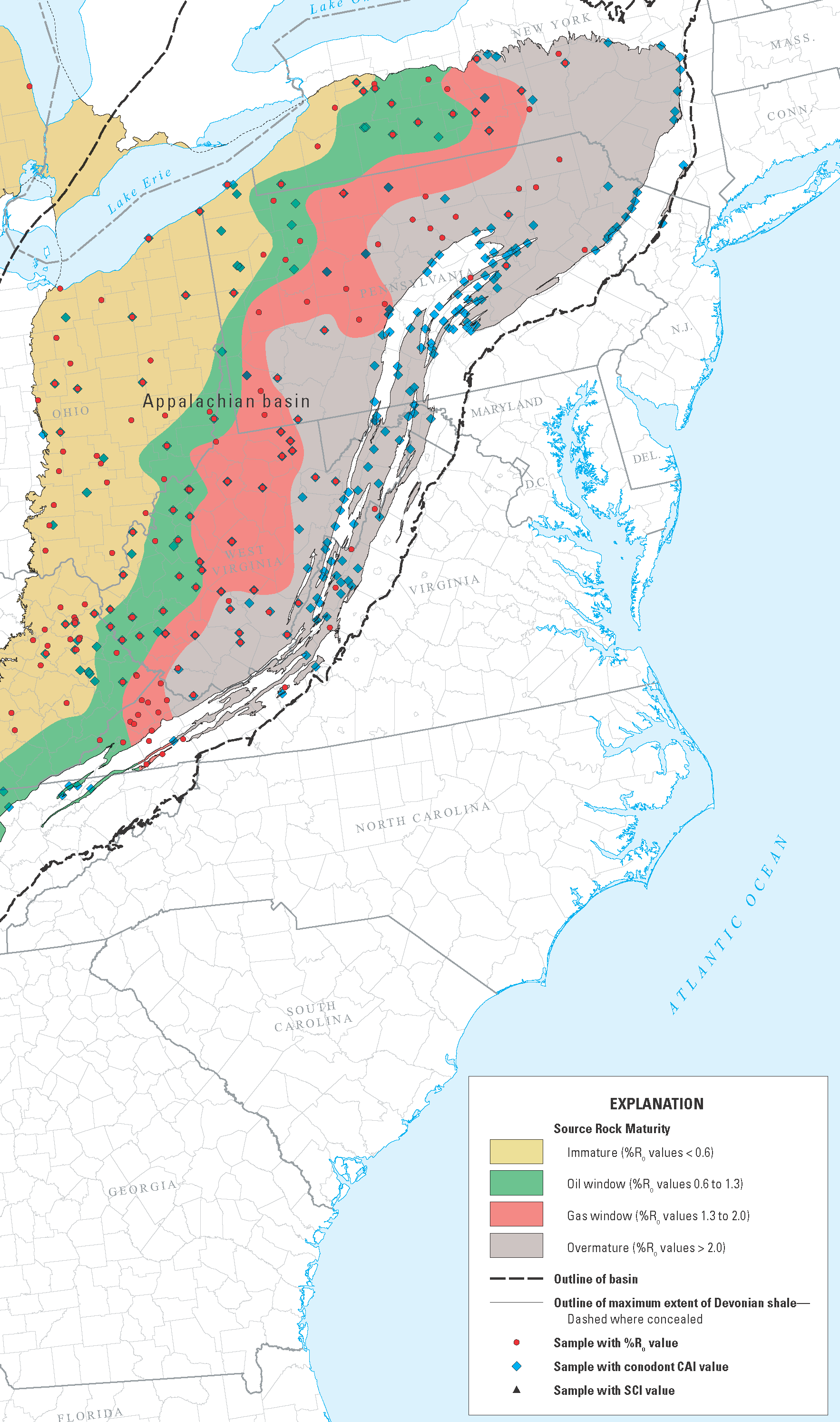
Thermal maturity of the Marcellus Shale

Estimates of recoverable natural gas in the Marcellus Shale have, and still do, vary greatly. Note that "resources" and "reserves" have different definitions, and are calculated differently. Nevertheless, the first to come forward with an enormous number was Terry Engelder (a Pennsylvania State University geosciences professor, and also co-principal with Gary G. Lash of the company Appalachian Fracture Systems Inc., a consulting firm) who announced his startling calculation of natural gas in 2008.

=== Estimated recoverable gas ===
- 2002, United States Geological Survey: 0.8 to 3.7 trillion cubic feet (TCF) of undiscovered, technically recoverable natural gas
- 2008, Terry Engelder, Pennsylvania State University geosciences professor (and also co-principal with Gary Lash of the company Appalachian Fracture Systems Inc., a consulting firm): 363 trillion cubic feet (10.3 trillion cubic metres) of recoverable natural gas
- 2008, Gary G. Lash, State University of New York at Fredonia geology professor (and also co-principal with Terry Engelder of the company Appalachian Fracture Systems Inc., a consulting firm): 49 TCF recoverable
- 2009, United States Department of Energy: 262 TCF of recoverable gas.
- 2011 United States Geological Survey: 42.954 to 144.145 trillion cubic feet (TCF) of undiscovered, technically recoverable natural gas
- 2011, US Energy Information Administration: 410 trillion cubic feet technically recoverable gas
- 2012, US Energy Information Administration: 141 trillion cubic feet technically recoverable gas

=== Proved reserves ===
- 2010, US Energy Information Administration: 13.2 trillion cubic feet of gas
- 2011, US Energy Information Administration: 31.9 trillion cubic feet of gas
- 2012, US Energy Information Administration: 42.8 trillion cubic feet of gas
- 2015, US Energy Information Administration: 148.7 trillion cubic feet of gas

=== Recoverable Gas and Energy Content relative to Area ===
148.7 trillion cubic feet of gas (4210 km3) of proven reserves (2015) divided by the Marcellus gas shale's total area of 104,000 square miles (270,000 square kilometers) is equivalent to a layer of 15.6 meter (51 feet) of natural gas being produced in average over the whole area. This corresponds to an energy density of around 160 kWh per square meter (15 kWh per square foot), assuming a typical energy content of natural gas. This energy density is a little smaller than the power production of a solar farm, relative to area occupied, in one year in this part of the US.

== Economic effects ==
=== Employment ===
According to the Financial Post, the boom in US shale oil production, using horizontal drilling and hydraulic fracturing, created thousands of jobs and reduced United States dependence on imported gas. During the 2012 presidential campaign, GOP Primary Candidate Rick Perry cited a study funded by the Marcellus Shale Coalition that fracking the Marcellus Formation is expected to create a quarter million jobs under the current policies of the Obama administration. New York state reported oil and natural gas drilling permit growth doubling from 2000 to 2008, contributing to 36,000 employment positions and an $8 billion economic impact in 2008. West Virginia's economy grew $1.3 billion in 2009 as a result of the rush. In 2010, Range Resources' Marcellus Shale Division reported producing 200 million cubic feet (5.7 million cubic metres) of gas. benefits of leasing mineral rights on their properties". In July of that year, the U.S. Department of Labor announced a $5 million grant to train workers for Marcellus shale drilling. By the end of 2010, it was reported that more drilling rigs were moving into Ohio, where the shale is more shallow.

The number of permits issued by Pennsylvania tripled between 2008 and 2009, including $3.5 billion in land acquisitions. An industry-sponsored study by Pennsylvania State University estimates there will be 200,000 new jobs in Pennsylvania by 2020 if shale is developed to its full potential. On the other hand, figures from the Pennsylvania Department of Labor and Industry show that only about 30,000 jobs were created during the 2008-2009 gas boom. It has also been found that companies are not hiring local workers, instead hiring experienced crews from Texas and Oklahoma for the high-paying work on drilling rigs.

=== Gas prices ===
Marcellus gas production has lowered the price of natural gas in the Mid-Atlantic states of the US, which previously were almost entirely dependent on gas pipelined in from the US Gulf Coast. From 2005 through 2008, wholesale gas prices at Mid-Atlantic states were $0.23 to $0.33 per million BTU above prices of the main Gulf Coast trading point, the Henry Hub. The US Energy Information Administration reported in 2012 that Marcellus production had lowered regional gas prices to nearly par with Henry Hub, and in October 2013, reported that future markets were predicting Appalachian gas prices to dip to $0.30 below Henry Hub in 2016. Unexpectedly, Henry Hub average price for natural gas in 2016 averaged $2.36 per million BTU.

A June 2011 New York Times investigation of industrial emails and internal documents found that the financial benefits of unconventional shale gas extraction may be less than previously thought, due to companies intentionally overstating the productivity of their wells and the size of their reserves. Drilling slowed in 2012 when gas prices dropped but the Nature Conservancy predicts that up to 60,000 wells will be drilled in Pennsylvania by 2030. A 2017 report by the International Energy Agency predicts that Marcellus gas extraction will increase up to 45% between 2016 and 2022 due to increased efficiency in spite of lower predicted gas prices.

== Policy ==
=== Federal ===
In 2005, the Energy Policy Act was passed by Congress, which exempted hydraulic fracturing from the regulations defined in the Safe Drinking Water Act, except where it involved the injection of diesel fuel. In 2009, the Fracturing Responsibility and Awareness of Chemicals (FRAC) Act was introduced to Congress to modify the 2005 Energy Policy Act. Its aim was to subject fracking fluid to the Safe Drinking Water Act, but additionally would have made companies have to disclose chemical constituents of the fracking fluid. The FRAC Act did not make it past committee review.

=== State ===
A large portion of the Marcellus formation underlies the environmentally sensitive Chesapeake Bay Watershed as well as the Delaware River Basin. The Delaware River Basin Commission, which holds regulatory jurisdiction over water usage, extraction, or potential contamination, has made a "determination" that requires that any component of a hydro-fracking operation within the boundaries of their Special Protection Waters must be permitted by the DRBC, regardless of whether or not the operation was previously subject to permitting. Faced with opposition to hydraulic fracturing in the New York City watershed area, Chesapeake Energy made a no-drilling pledge for five miles around the watershed; but the company opposed any legislation like that presented by Jim Brennan (D-Brooklyn), October 2009.

The Pennsylvania Department of Environmental Protection (PA DEP) has made many changes since 2008, including doubling the number of oil and gas inspection staff and implementing new water quality standards. In 2010, amendments to Pennsylvania law regarding casing and cementing requirements for wells were revised and routine inspections of existing wells are now required. Gas companies are also required to submit pre-drilling water test results to the PA DEP and to water supply owners under these new amendments. Also in 2010, the Pennsylvania Environmental Quality Board revised regulations regarding wastewater treatment and disposal. Only wastewater that is treated at a centralized wastewater treatment facility and that meets certain quality standards can be disposed of in surface waters.

New York City under the New York City Gas Fuel Code made it illegal to drill within city limits. In 2010 Pittsburgh banned hydraulic fracturing within city limits.

As of 2017, New York, Vermont, and Maryland have banned hydraulic fracturing from being used in their state.

== Environmental issues ==
The environmental impacts of fracking the Marcellus Shale are diverse. Effects on surface water, groundwater, traffic, earthquake activity, and human health are discussed here. Other associated issues include disposal of produced water, drilling safety, forest fragmentation, encroachment on residential communities, methane emissions, and land reclamation.

=== Water use ===
The massive hydraulic fracturing in the Marcellus uses three to five million gallons of water per well, usually taken from surface water. In Pennsylvania, withdrawals for Marcellus fracking make up 0.2% of the total water use statewide. Due to large withdrawals of surface water many water bodies may experience increased salinization and warming.

The Susquehanna River Basin Commission, which oversees this other portion of the watershed, and the Pennsylvania Department of Environmental Protection, issued orders to suspend operations at several wells in May 2008 because surface water was being diverted by the drillers without the necessary permits, and precautions to protect streams from contaminated runoff were questioned.

=== Surface water ===
The three main pathways of surface water contamination from shale gas extraction are spills of produced water, illegal dumping of wastewater, and inadequate treatment before discharge of produced water. The two most common pollutants associated with spills are total dissolved solids and conductivity; the increase in conductivity can be mostly attributed to bromide and chloride concentrations.

=== Groundwater ===
Fugitive gas emissions can infiltrate into local aquifers around hydraulic fracturing well pads through natural underground fractures, as well as those created during the hydraulic fracturing process. In many cases, there is a significant lack of baseline data to determine if methane migration can be attributed to gas extraction or if it is naturally occurring. Recent studies evaluating noble gas concentrations, hydrocarbon stable isotopes, and molecular carbon ratios have been used to determine if the source of methane contamination is due to gas extraction. Analyses have also been done to test for the presence of diesel fuel compounds to understand if aquifer contamination came from surface infiltration or underground migration. Destabilization of surrounding rock can cause the unintended migration of hydraulic fracking materials or wastewater in injection wells. A 2013 study which evaluated data from 1701 water wells throughout Susquehanna County in northeastern Pennsylvania, concluded that methane was common in water wells, and that the presence of methane is best correlated with topography and groundwater geochemistry, rather than shale-gas extraction activities. The authors concluded that "This finding suggests that shale-gas extraction in northeastern Pennsylvania has not resulted in regional gas impacts on drinking water resources".

The Pennsylvania Department of Environmental Protection concluded that Marcellus gas wells caused dissolved methane to contaminate up to 15 domestic water wells in Dimock Township, Susquehanna County, Pennsylvania. This conclusion is disputed by Cabot Oil & Gas Corp., which was cited for causing the contamination. It is also disputed by other long-term area residents who noted that high methane levels had been present for more than 60 years prior to hydraulic fracturing in Dimock. Pennsylvania state law sets a "rebuttable presumption" for contamination occurring in water supply wells near oil and gas wells, meaning that the law automatically holds oil and gas operators responsible for contamination in nearby water wells, unless the companies can demonstrate that they were not responsible. The new Pennsylvania oil and gas law passed in February 2012 increased the rebuttable presumption distance around each oil and gas well, from 1,000 feet to 2,500 feet, and increased the time period from 6 months to one year following drilling, completion, or alteration of a well bore.

=== Methane emissions ===
In 2018, Environmental Defense Fund scientists found that the Marcellus shale industry in Pennsylvania emits twice as much methane as is reported to the Pennsylvania Department of Environmental Protection. One study indicated that the large Marcellus shale wells lost .3 percent of their gas, while the 70,000 conventional gas wells in Pennsylvania drilled into shallow formations were losing about 23 percent of their gas; however, the total amount of methane emissions in 2015 was roughly equivalent for the two types of wells. New state standards will require periodic monitoring of wells to prevent super-emitters.

=== Traffic ===
There are also impacts from heavier traffic and construction around extraction and injection wells that can increase erosion and result in sedimentation in surrounding streams. Engineers in the Pennsylvania Department of Transportation have documented damage caused by the heavy trucks and tankers. Damage includes crushing of drain pipes, potholes, rutting, and pavement fatigue failure. The cost of these repairs are often much higher than the Pennsylvania Department of Transportation is allowed to charge for road use. In addition to causing road damage, when heavy trucks and tankers drive over farmland, they compact the subsoil, which increases runoff and decreases crop productivity for years. Ecologists also have concerns about the ecological impact on forests when trees are cut down to make way for access roads.

=== Earthquake activity ===
Youngstown, Ohio experienced a 4.0-magnitude earthquake on December 31, 2011, the area's 11th earthquake in 10 months. Experts believe that these were induced seismicity triggered by disposal of wastewater from Marcellus gas wells into Class II underground injection wells. The Ohio Department of Natural Resources Ohio Seismic Network (OhioSeis) determined that the 2011 earthquakes are distinct from previous seismic activity in the region because of their proximity to the Northstar 1, a Class II deep injection well. All of the earthquakes were clustered less than a mile around the well. ODNR then ordered the company to shut down operations and plug the well. ODNR has continued to report increased seismic activity through 2017 in eastern Ohio in near proximity to injection wells.

=== Potential carbon impact ===
In 2022, a team of researchers in a paper published in Energy Policy identified the Marcellus Shale as a "carbon bomb," a fossil fuel project that would result in more than one gigaton of carbon dioxide emissions if fully extracted and burnt. The Marcellus Shale is the second-largest carbon bomb in the United States the researchers identified, with a total of 26.7 gigatons of CO_{2} if full developed and used.

== Social issues ==
=== Human health impacts ===
The reliance on untreated well water in the rural regions of the Marcellus leaves communities at a strong disadvantage if aquifer contamination were to occur. It has been found that methane concentrations in well water within one kilometer from an active gas well were 17 times higher than in those outside of active gas production areas. Produced water includes naturally occurring radioactive materials, as well as high levels of brine, barium, strontium, and radium. At high exposure levels, these contaminants have been shown to cause skin rashes, nausea, abdominal pain, breathing difficulties, headaches, dizziness, eye irritations, throat irritations, and nosebleeds. Residents are also exposed to a myriad of air pollutants through mechanisms such as well-venting and flaring. Volatile organic compounds, diesel particulate matter, and methane are found in elevated levels around producing wells, often in concentrations that exceed EPA guidelines for carcinogenic health risks. Unfortunately, there have been no studies to try and quantify the cumulative impacts of multiple low dose exposures.

Additionally, there are negative mental health impacts. Gas field community members experience increased anxiety, depression, concern about lifestyle, health of children, safety, financial security, landscape changes, and exposure to toxins.

=== Legal cases ===
List of current cases identified in "Hydraulic Fracturing Tort Litigation Summary" on October 28, 2017.

Year Filled	Case Name	Status	State
2009	Maring v. Nalbone	Pending	NY
2011	Baker v. Anschutz Exploration Corp	Closed	NY
2008	Siers v. John D. Oil and Gas Co	Settled	OH
2009	Payne v. Ohio Valley Energy Systems Corp.	Settled	OH
2010	Alford v. East Gas Ohio Co.	Jury Verdict Affirmed	OH
2012	Boggs v. Landmark 4 LLC	Settled	OH
2012	Mangan v. Landmark 4, LLC	Settled	OH
2016	Crothers v. Statoil USA Onshore Properties	Settled	OH
2009	Zimmermann v. Atlas America, LLC	Settled	PA
2009	Fiorentino (Ely) v. Cabot Oil and Gas Corp.	Jury Verdict/Settled	PA
2010	Stephanie Hallowich, H/W, v. Range Resources Corporation	Settled	PA
2010	Berish v. Southwestern Energy Production Co.	Closed	PA
2010	Armstrong v. Chesapeake Appalachia, LLC	Settled	PA
2010	Bidlack v. Chesapeake Appalachia, LLC	Closed	PA
2010	Otis v. Chesapeake Appalachia, LLC	Closed	PA
2011	Burnett v. Chesapeake Appalachia, LLC	Dismissed	PA
2011	Phillips v. Chesapeake Appalachia, LLC	Settled	PA
2011	Becka v. Antero Resources	Settled	PA
2011	Dillon v. Antero Resources	Settled	PA
2011	Kamuck v. Shell Energy Holdings GP, LLC	Decided	PA
2012	Roth v. Cabot Oil & Gas Corporation	Settled	PA
2012	Manning v. WPX Energy Inc.	Settled	PA
2012	Kalp v. WPX Energy Appalachia, LLC	Settled	PA
2012	Haney v. Range Resources	Settled	PA
2012	Butts v. Southwestern Energy Production Company	Settled	PA
2013	Bezjak v. Chevron Appalachia LLC	Settled	PA
2013	Leighton v. Chesapeake Appalachia, LLC	Settled	PA
2013	Brown v. WPX Appalachia LLC	Settled	PA
2013	Russell v. Chesapeake Appalachia	Dismissed	PA
2014	Arbitration between J. Place and Chesapeake	Decided	PA
2014	Chaffee v. Talisman Energy USA Inc.	Decided	PA
2014	Tiongco v. Southwestern Energy Production Co.	Pending	PA
2014	Lauff v. Range Resources - Appalachia LLC	Pending	PA
2014	Chito v. Hilcorp Energy Company	Dismissed	PA
2015	Dubrasky v. Hilcorp Energy Company	Closed	PA
2015	Baumgardner v. Chesapeake Appalachia	Pending	PA
2017	Kemble v. Cabot Oil & Gas Corporation	Dismissed	PA
2017	Cabot Oil & Gas Corporation v. Speer	Pending	PA
2010	Magers v. Chesapeake Appalachia, LLC	Settled	WV
2010	Hagy v. Equitable Production Co.	Dismissed; Affirmed	WV
2010	Teel v. Chesapeake Appalachia, LLC	Dismissed; Affirmed	WV
2011	Whiteman v. Chesapeake Appalachia, LLC	Decided; Affirmed	WV
2011	Rine v. Chesapeake Appalachia, LLC	Settled	WV
2011	Bombardiere v. Schlumberger Technology Corp	Dismissed	WV
2011	Cain v. XTO Energy Inc	Settled	WV
2011	Perna v. Reserve Oil & Gas, Inc	Dismissed	WV
2010	Dent v. Chesapeake Appalachia, LL	Settled	WV
2013	Dytko v. Chesapeake Appalachia, LLC	Dismissed	WV
2014	Locker v. Encana Oil and Gas (USA) Inc.	Pending	WV
2014	Bertrand v. Gastar Exploration	Pending	WV
2016	Easthom v. EQT Production Co.	Settled	WV

Other federal cases regarding gas extraction in the Marcellus can be found here.
