= Volatile organic compound =

Chemical with a high vapor pressure at room temperature

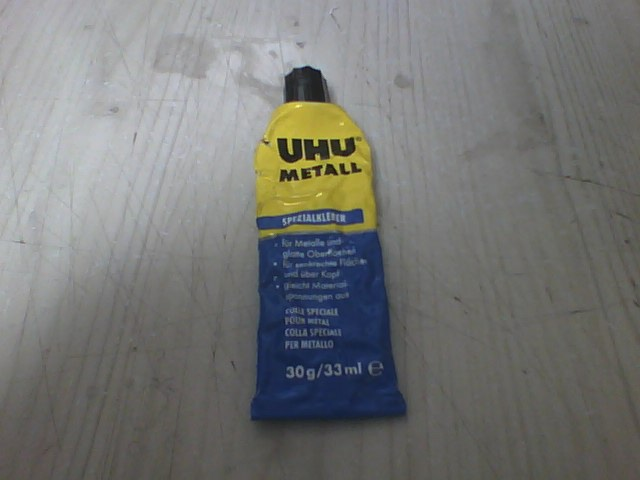
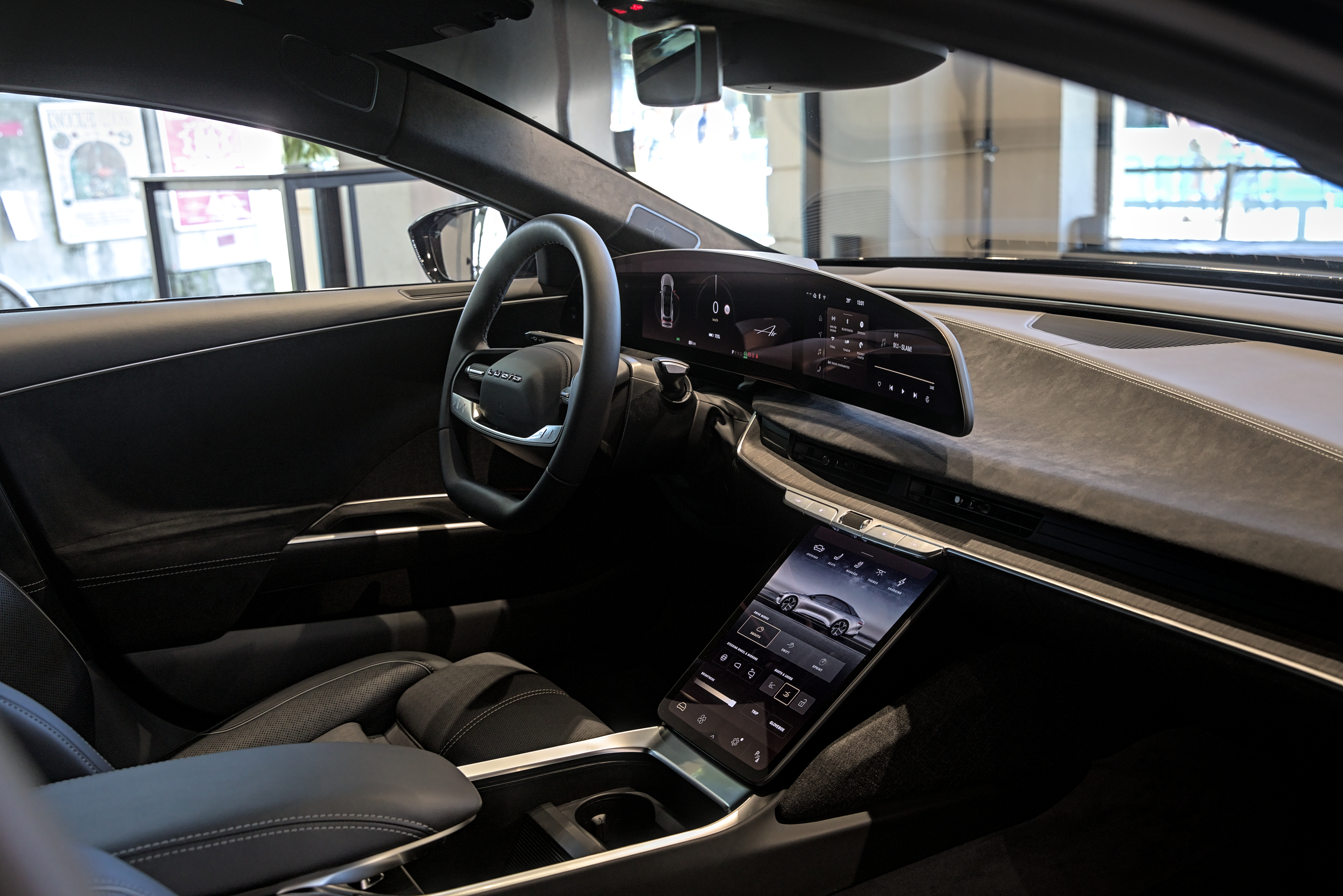
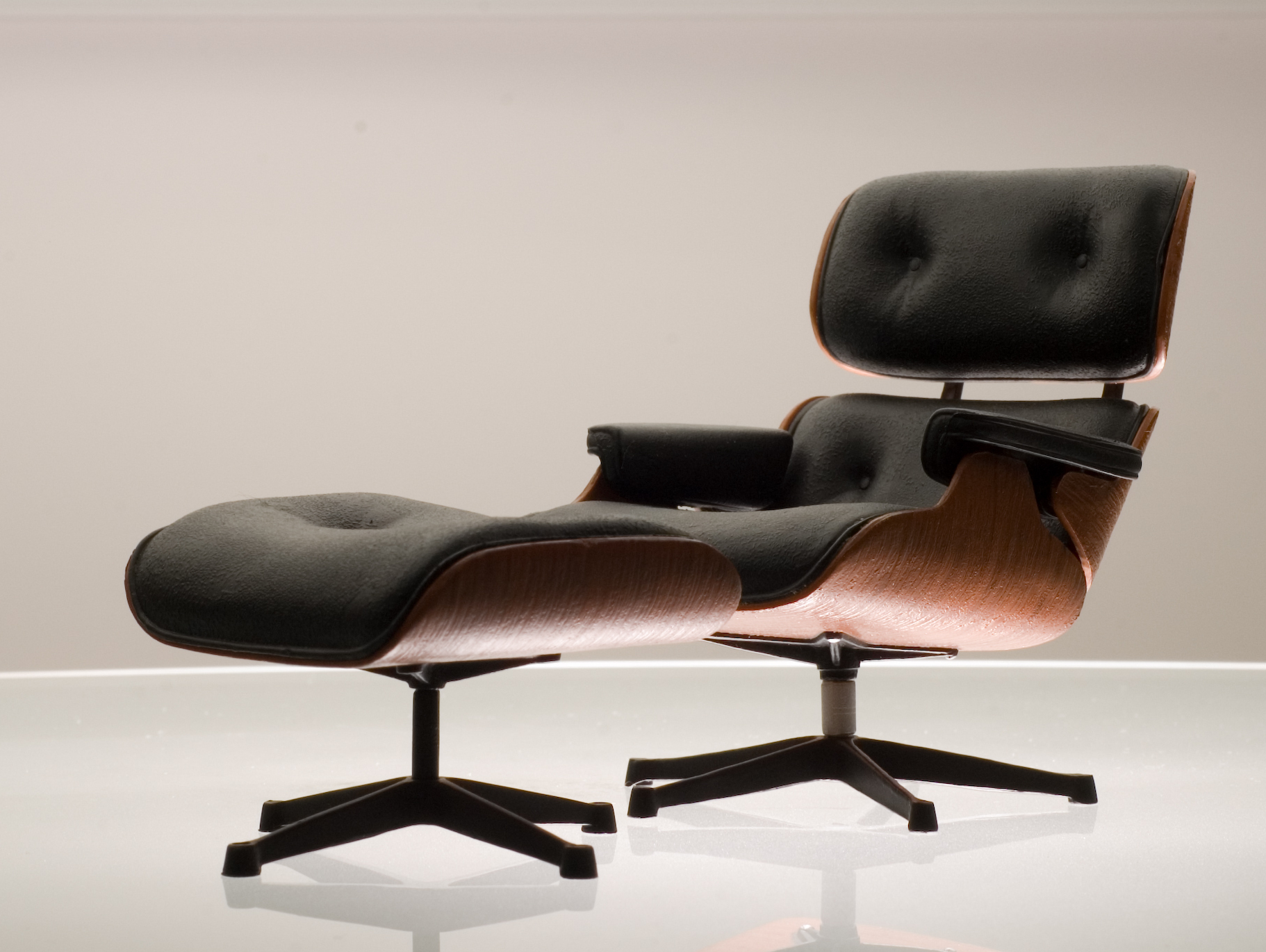
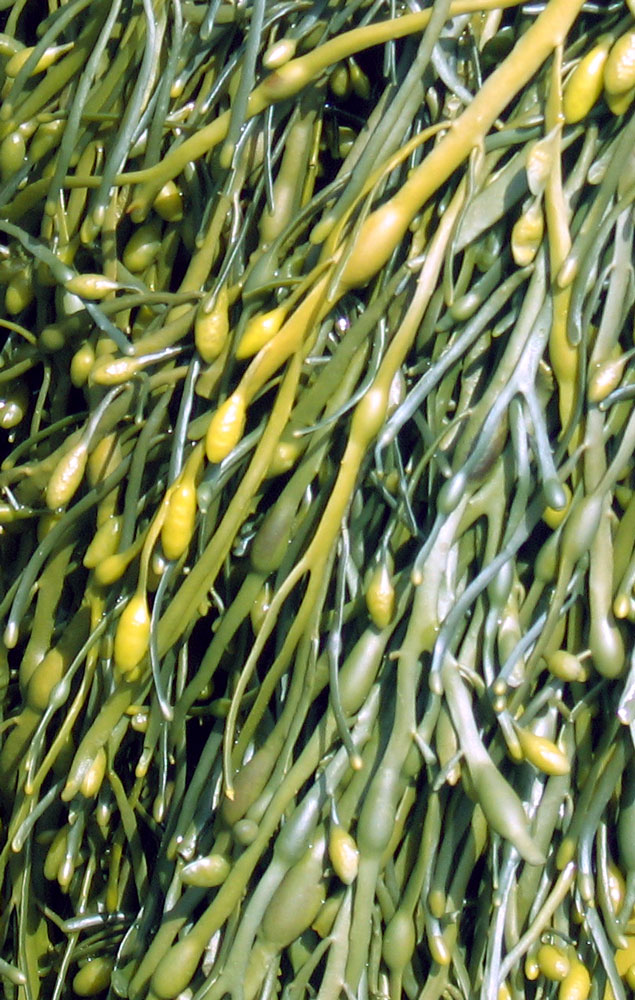
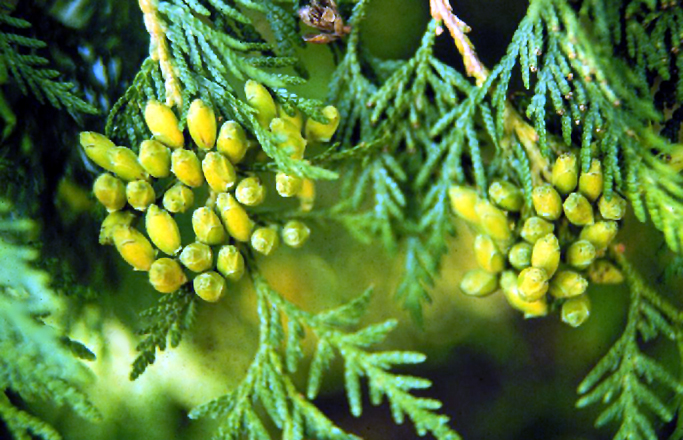
VOCs are found in many things, including glue, new car interiors, upholstered furniture, sea weed, and trees.

Volatile organic compounds (VOCs) are organic compounds that have a high vapor pressure at room temperature. They are common and exist in a variety of settings and products, not limited to upholstered furniture, arts and crafts supplies, dry cleaned clothing, and cleaning supplies. VOCs are responsible for the odor of scents and perfumes as well as pollutants. They play an important role in communication between animals and plants, such as attractants for pollinators, protection from predation, and even inter-plant interactions. Some VOCs are dangerous to human health or cause harm to the environment, often despite the odor being perceived as pleasant, such as "new car smell".

Anthropogenic VOCs are regulated by law, especially indoors, where concentrations are the highest. Most VOCs are not acutely toxic, but may have long-term chronic health effects. Some VOCs have been used in pharmaceutical settings, while others are the target of administrative controls because of their recreational use. The high vapor pressure of VOCs correlates with a low boiling point, which relates to the number of the sample's molecules in the surrounding air, a trait known as volatility.

== Definitions ==
Diverse definitions of the term VOC are in use. Some examples are presented below.

=== Canada ===
Health Canada classifies VOCs as organic compounds that have boiling points roughly in the range of 50 to 250 °C (122 to 482 °F). The emphasis is placed on commonly encountered VOCs that would have an effect on air quality.

=== European Union ===
The European Union defines a VOC as "any organic compound as well as the fraction of creosote, having at 293.15 K a vapour pressure of 0.01 kPa or more, or having a corresponding volatility under the particular conditions of use;". The VOC Solvents Emissions Directive was the main policy instrument for the reduction of industrial emissions of volatile organic compounds (VOCs) in the European Union. It covers a wide range of solvent-using activities, e.g. printing, surface cleaning, vehicle coating, dry cleaning and manufacture of footwear and pharmaceutical products. The VOC Solvents Emissions Directive requires installations in which such activities are applied to comply either with the emission limit values set out in the Directive or with the requirements of the so-called reduction scheme. Article 13 of The Paints Directive, approved in 2004, amended the original VOC Solvents Emissions Directive and limits the use of organic solvents in decorative paints and varnishes and in vehicle finishing products. The Paints Directive sets out maximum VOC content limit values for paints and varnishes in certain applications. The Solvents Emissions Directive was replaced by the Industrial Emissions Directive from 2013.

=== Switzerland ===
Organic compounds with a vapor pressure of at least 0.1 mbar at 20 °C or with a boiling point of no more than 240 °C at 1013.25 mbar.

=== China ===
The People's Republic of China defines a VOC as those compounds that have "originated from automobiles, industrial production and civilian use, burning of all types of fuels, storage and transportation of oils, fitment finish, coating for furniture and machines, cooking oil fume and fine particles (PM 2.5)", and similar sources. In July 2018, the State Council released the "Three-Year Action Plan for Winning the Blue Sky Defence War", planning to reduce 2015 VOC emissions 10% by 2020.

=== India ===
The Central Pollution Control Board of India released the Air (Prevention and Control of Pollution) Act in 1981, amended in 1987, to address concerns about air pollution in India. While the document does not differentiate between VOCs and other air pollutants, the CPCB monitors "oxides of nitrogen (NO_{x}), sulphur dioxide (SO_{2}), fine particulate matter (PM10) and suspended particulate matter (SPM)".

=== United States ===
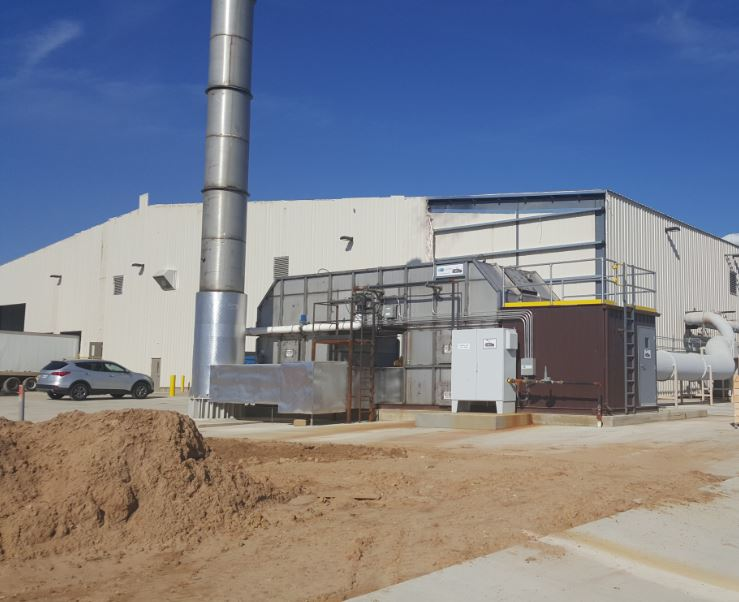
Thermal oxidizers provide an air pollution abatement option for VOCs from industrial air flows. A thermal oxidizer is an EPA-approved device to treat VOCs.

The definitions of VOCs used for control of precursors of photochemical smog used by the U.S. Environmental Protection Agency (EPA) and state agencies in the US with independent outdoor air pollution regulations include exemptions for VOCs that are determined to be non-reactive, or of low-reactivity in the smog formation process. Prominent is the VOC regulation issued by the South Coast Air Quality Management District in California and by the California Air Resources Board (CARB). However, this specific use of the term VOCs can be misleading, especially when applied to indoor air quality because many chemicals that are not regulated as outdoor air pollution can still be important for indoor air pollution.

Following a public hearing in September 1995, California's ARB uses the term "reactive organic gases" (ROG) to measure organic gases. The CARB revised the definition of "Volatile Organic Compounds" used in their consumer products regulations, based on the committee's findings.

In addition to drinking water, VOCs are regulated in pollutant discharges to surface waters (both directly and via sewage treatment plants) as hazardous waste, but not in non-industrial indoor air. The Occupational Safety and Health Administration (OSHA) regulates VOC exposure in the workplace. Volatile organic compounds that are classified as hazardous materials are regulated by the Pipeline and Hazardous Materials Safety Administration while being transported.

== Biologically generated VOCs ==
Limonene, a common biogenic VOC, is emitted into the atmosphere primarily by trees which grow in coniferous forests.

Most VOCs in Earth's atmosphere are biogenic, largely emitted by plants.

Major biogenic VOCs
compound	relative contribution	amount emitted (Tg/y)
isoprene	62.2%	594±34
terpenes	10.9%	95±3
pinene isomers	5.6%	48.7±0.8
sesquiterpenes	2.4%	20±1
methanol	6.4%	130±4

Biogenic volatile organic compounds (BVOCs) encompass VOCs emitted by plants, animals, or microorganisms, and while extremely diverse, are most commonly terpenoids, alcohols, and carbonyls (methane and carbon monoxide are generally not considered). Not counting methane, biological sources emit an estimated 760 teragrams of carbon per year in the form of VOCs. The majority of VOCs are produced by plants, the main compound being isoprene. Small amounts of VOCs are produced by animals and microbes. Many VOCs are considered secondary metabolites, which often help organisms in defense, such as plant defense against herbivory. The strong odor emitted by many plants consists of green leaf volatiles, a subset of VOCs.

Emissions are affected by a variety of factors, such as temperature, which determines rates of volatilization and growth, and sunlight, which determines rates of biosynthesis. Emission occurs almost exclusively from the leaves, the stomata in particular. VOCs emitted by terrestrial forests are often oxidized by hydroxyl radicals in the atmosphere; in the absence of NO_{x} pollutants, VOC photochemistry recycles hydroxyl radicals to create a sustainable biosphere–atmosphere balance. Due to recent climate change developments, such as warming and greater UV radiation, BVOC emissions from plants are generally predicted to increase, thus upsetting the biosphere–atmosphere interaction and damaging major ecosystems. A major class of VOCs is the terpene class of compounds, such as myrcene.

Providing a sense of scale, a forest 62,000 square kilometres (24,000 sq mi) in area, the size of the U.S. state of Pennsylvania, is estimated to emit 3.4 million kg (7.5 million lb) of terpenes on a typical August day during the growing season. Maize produces the VOC (Z)-3-hexen-1-ol and other plant hormones. The taste of bitterness, found in foods such as olives, coffee and dark chocolate is caused by detection of VOCs by taste receptors.

== Anthropogenic sources ==
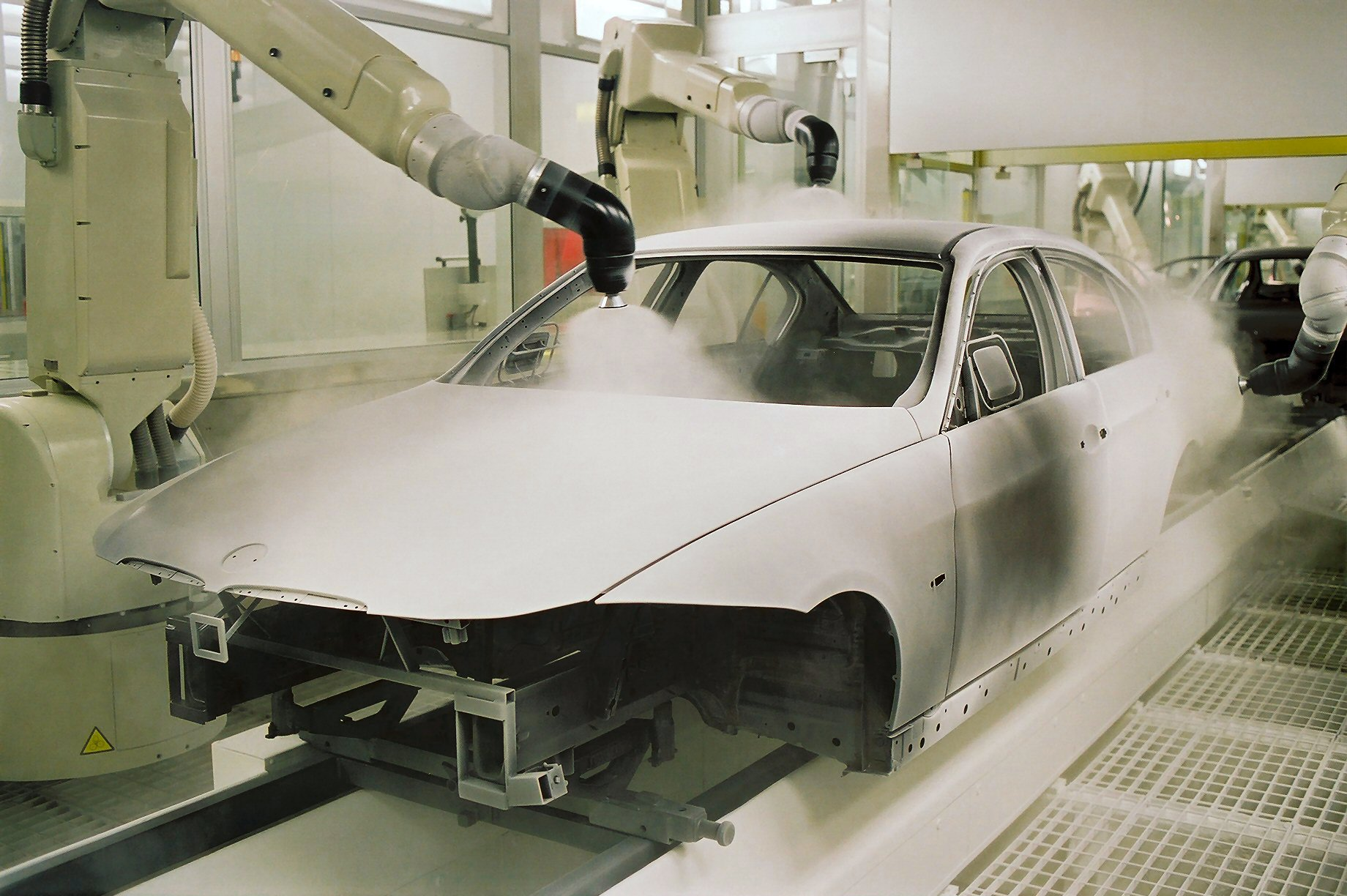
Paints and coatings are major anthropogenic sources of VOCs.

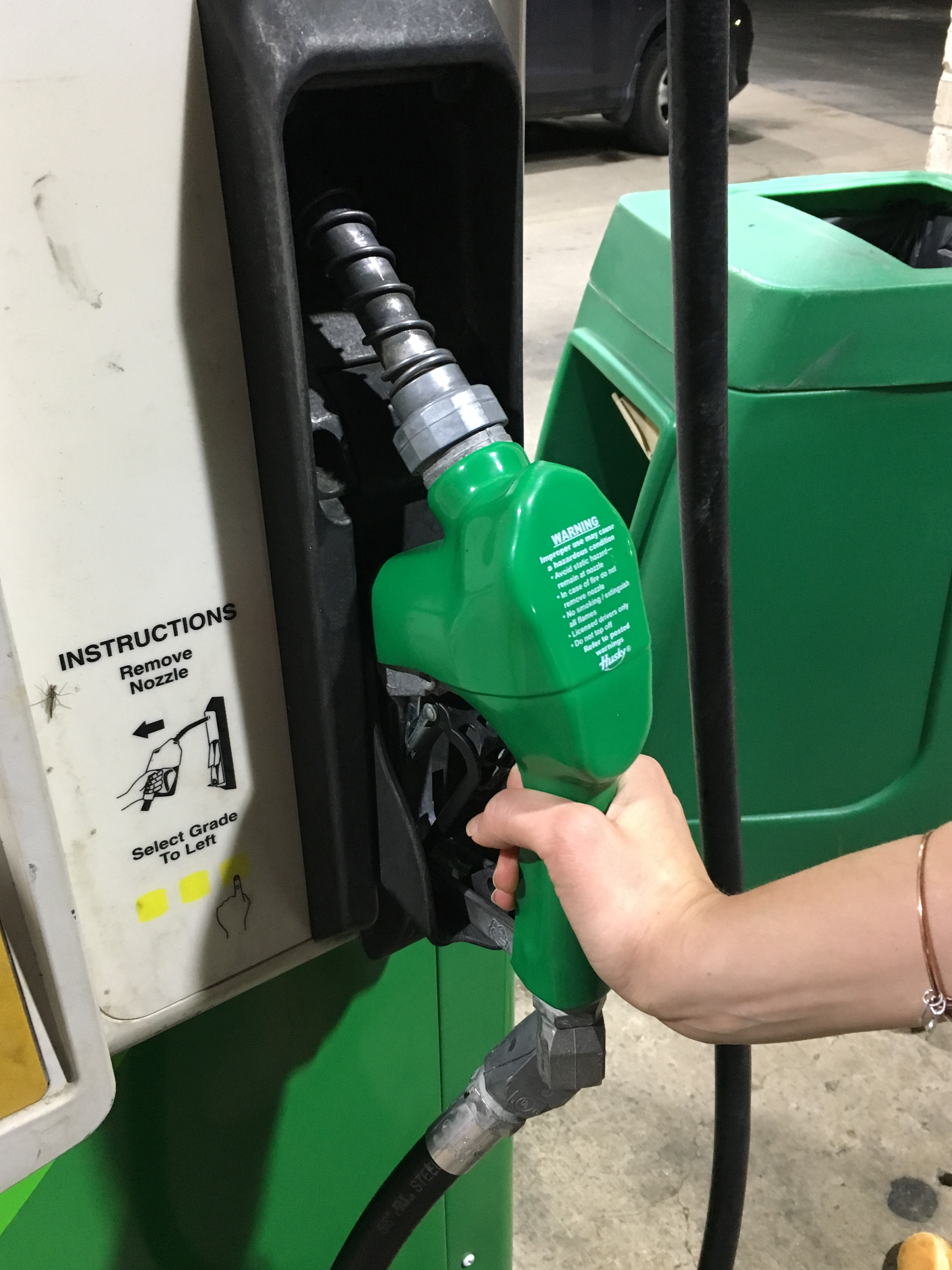
The handling of petroleum-based fuels is a major source of VOCs.

Anthropogenic sources emit about 142 teragrams (1.42 × 10^{11} kg, or 142 billion kg) of carbon per year in the form of VOCs.

The major source of man-made VOCs are:

- Fossil fuel use and production, e.g. incompletely combusted fossil fuels or unintended evaporation of fuels. The most prevalent VOC is ethane, a relatively inert compound.
- Solvents used in coatings, paints, and inks. Approximately 12 billion litres of paint are produced annually. Typical solvents include aliphatic hydrocarbons, ethyl acetate, glycol ethers and acetone. Motivated by cost, environmental concerns, and regulation, the paint and coating industries are increasingly shifting toward aqueous solvents.
- Compressed aerosol products, mainly butane and propane, estimated to contribute 1.3 million tonnes of VOC emissions per year globally.
- Biofuel use, e.g., cooking oils in Asia and bioethanol in Brazil.
- Biomass combustion, especially from rain forests. Although combustion principally releases carbon dioxide and water, incomplete combustion affords a variety of VOCs.

== Indoor VOCs ==
Due to their numerous sources indoors, concentrations of VOCs indoors are consistently higher (up to ten times higher) than outdoors. VOCs are emitted by thousands of indoor products. Examples include: paints, varnishes, waxes and lacquers, paint strippers, cleaning and personal care products, pesticides, building materials and furnishings, office equipment such as copiers and printers, correction fluids and carbonless copy paper, graphics and craft materials including glues and adhesives, permanent markers, and photographic solutions. Human activities such as cooking and cleaning can also emit VOCs. Cooking can release long-chain aldehydes and alkanes when oil is heated and terpenes can be released when spices are prepared and/or cooked. Cleaning products contain a range of VOCs, including monoterpenes, sesquiterpenes, alcohols and esters. Once released into the air, VOCs can undergo reactions with ozone and hydroxyl radicals to produce other VOCs, such as formaldehyde.

Some VOCs are emitted directly indoors, and some are formed through the subsequent chemical reactions. The total concentration of all VOCs (TVOC) indoors can be up to five times higher than that of outdoor levels.

New buildings experience particularly high levels of VOC off-gassing indoors because of the abundant new materials (building materials, fittings, surface coverings and treatments such as glues, paints and sealants) exposed to the indoor air, emitting multiple VOC gases. This off-gassing has a multi-exponential decay trend that is discernible over at least two years, with the most volatile compounds decaying with a time-constant of a few days, and the least volatile compounds decaying with a time-constant of a few years.

New buildings may require intensive ventilation for the first few months, or a bake-out treatment. Existing buildings may be replenished with new VOC sources, such as new furniture, consumer products, and redecoration of indoor surfaces, all of which lead to a continuous background emission of TVOCs, and requiring improved ventilation.

There are strong seasonal variations in indoors VOC emissions, with emission rates increasing in summer. This is largely due to the rate of diffusion of VOC species through materials to the surface, increasing with temperature. This leads to generally higher concentrations of TVOCs indoors in summer.

=== Indoor air-quality measurements ===
Measurement of VOCs from the indoor air is done with sorption tubes e. g. Tenax (for VOCs and SVOCs) or DNPH-cartridges (for carbonyl-compounds) or air detector. The VOCs adsorb on these materials and are afterwards desorbed either thermally (Tenax) or by elution (DNPH) and then analyzed by GC–MS/FID or HPLC. Reference gas mixtures are required for quality control of these VOC measurements. Furthermore, VOC emitting products used indoors, e.g. building products and furniture, are investigated in emission test chambers under controlled climatic conditions. For quality control of these measurements round robin tests are carried out, therefore reproducibly emitting reference materials are ideally required. Other methods have used proprietary Silcosteel-coated canisters with constant flow inlets to collect samples over several days. These methods are not limited by the adsorbing properties of materials like Tenax.

=== Regulation of indoor VOC emissions ===
In most countries, a separate definition of VOCs is used with regard to indoor air quality that comprises each organic chemical compound that can be measured as follows: adsorption from air on Tenax TA, thermal desorption, gas chromatographic separation over a 100% nonpolar column (dimethylpolysiloxane). VOC (volatile organic compounds) are all compounds that appear in the gas chromatogram between and including n-hexane and n-hexadecane. Compounds appearing earlier are called VVOC (very volatile organic compounds); compounds appearing later are called SVOC (semi-volatile organic compounds).

France, Germany (AgBB/DIBt), Belgium, Norway (TEK regulation) and Italy (CAM Edilizia) have enacted regulations to limit VOC emissions from commercial products. European industry has developed numerous voluntary ecolabels and rating systems, such as EMICODE, M1, Blue Angel, GuT (textile floor coverings), Nordic Swan Ecolabel, EU Ecolabel, and Indoor Air Comfort. In the United States, several standards exist; California Standard CDPH Section 01350 is the most common one. These regulations and standards changed the marketplace, leading to an increasing number of low-emitting products.

=== Health risks ===
Respiratory, allergic, or immune effects in infants or children are associated with man-made VOCs and other indoor or outdoor air pollutants.

Some VOCs, such as styrene and limonene, can react with nitrogen oxides or with ozone to produce new oxidation products and secondary aerosols, which can cause sensory irritation symptoms. VOCs contribute to the formation of tropospheric ozone and smog.

Health effects include eye, nose, and throat irritation; headaches, loss of coordination, nausea, hearing disorders and damage to the liver, kidney, and central nervous system. Some VOCs are suspected or known to cause cancer in humans. Key signs or symptoms associated with exposure to VOCs include conjunctival irritation, nose and throat discomfort, headache, allergic skin reaction, dyspnea, declines in serum cholinesterase levels, nausea, vomiting, nose bleeding, fatigue, dizziness.

The ability of organic chemicals to cause health effects varies greatly from those that are highly toxic to those with no known health effects. As with other pollutants, the extent and nature of the health effect will depend on many factors including level of exposure and length of time exposed. Eye and respiratory tract irritation, headaches, dizziness, visual disorders, and memory impairment are among the immediate symptoms that some people have experienced soon after exposure to some organics. At present, not much is known about what health effects occur from the levels of organics usually found in homes.

==== Ingestion ====
While null in comparison to the concentrations found in indoor air, benzene, toluene, and methyl tert-butyl ether (MTBE) were found in samples of human milk and increase the concentrations of VOCs that we are exposed to throughout the day. A study notes the difference between VOCs in alveolar breath and inspired air suggesting that VOCs are ingested, metabolized, and excreted via the extra-pulmonary pathway. VOCs are also ingested by drinking water in varying concentrations. Some VOC concentrations were over the EPA's National Primary Drinking Water Regulations and China's National Drinking Water Standards set by the Ministry of Ecology and Environment.

==== Dermal absorption ====
The presence of VOCs in the air and in groundwater has prompted more studies. Several studies have been performed to measure the effects of dermal absorption of specific VOCs. Dermal exposure to VOCs like formaldehyde and toluene downregulate antimicrobial peptides on the skin like cathelicidin LL-37, human β-defensin 2 and 3. Xylene and formaldehyde worsen allergic inflammation in animal models. Toluene also increases the dysregulation of filaggrin: a key protein in dermal regulation. this was confirmed by immunofluorescence to confirm protein loss and western blotting to confirm mRNA loss. These experiments were done on human skin samples. Toluene exposure also decreased the water in the trans-epidermal layer allowing for vulnerability in the skin's layers.

=== Limit values for VOC emissions ===
Limit values for VOC emissions into indoor air are published by AgBB, AFSSET, California Department of Public Health, and others. These regulations have prompted several companies in the paint and adhesive industries to adapt with VOC level reductions their products. VOC labels and certification programs may not properly assess all of the VOCs emitted from the product, including some chemical compounds that may be relevant for indoor air quality. Each ounce of colorant added to tint paint may contain between 5 and 20 grams of VOCs. A dark color, however, could require 5–15 ounces of colorant, adding up to 300 or more grams of VOCs per gallon of paint.

=== VOCs in healthcare settings ===
VOCs are also found in hospital and health care environments. In these settings, these chemicals are widely used for cleaning, disinfection, and hygiene of the different areas. Thus, health professionals such as nurses, doctors, sanitation staff, etc., may present with adverse health effects such as asthma; however, further evaluation is required to determine the exact levels and determinants that influence the exposure to these compounds.

Concentration levels of individual VOCs such as halogenated and aromatic hydrocarbons vary substantially between areas of the same hospital. Generally, ethanol, isopropanol, ether, and acetone are the main compounds in the interior of the site. Following the same line, in a study conducted in the United States, it was established that nursing assistants are the most exposed to compounds such as ethanol, while medical equipment preparers are most exposed to 2-propanol.

In relation to exposure to VOCs by cleaning and hygiene personnel, a study conducted in 4 hospitals in the United States established that sterilization and disinfection workers are linked to exposures to d-limonene and 2-propanol, while those responsible for cleaning with chlorine-containing products are more likely to have higher levels of exposure to α-pinene and chloroform. Those who perform floor and other surface cleaning tasks (e.g., floor waxing) and who use quaternary ammonium, alcohol, and chlorine-based products are associated with a higher VOC exposure than the two previous groups, that is, they are particularly linked to exposure to acetone, chloroform, α-pinene, 2-propanol or d-limonene.

Other healthcare environments such as nursing and age care homes have been rarely a subject of study, even though the elderly and vulnerable populations may spend considerable time in these indoor settings where they might be exposed to VOCs, derived from the common use of cleaning agents, sprays and fresheners. In one study, more than 200 chemicals were identified, of which 41 have adverse health effects, 37 of them being VOCs. The health effects include skin sensitization, reproductive and organ-specific toxicity, carcinogenicity, mutagenicity, and endocrine-disrupting properties. Furthermore, in another study carried out in the same European country, it was found that there is a significant association between breathlessness in the elderly population and elevated exposure to VOCs such as toluene and o-xylene, unlike the remainder of the population.

=== VOCs in hospitality and retail ===
Workers in hospitality are also exposed to VOCs from a variety of sources including cleaning products (air fresheners, floor cleaners, disinfectants, etc.), building materials and furnishings, as well as fragrances. One of the most common VOC found in hospitality settings are alkanes, which are a major ingredient in cleaning products (35%). Other products present in hospitality that contain alkanes are laundry detergents, paints, and lubricants. Housekeepers in particular may also be exposed to formaldehyde, which is present in some fabrics used to make towels and bedding, however exposure decreases after several washes. Some hotels still use bleach to clean, and this bleach can form chloroform and carbon tetrachloride. Fragrances are often used in hotels and are composed of many different chemicals.

There are many negative health outcomes associated with VOC exposure in hospitality. VOCs present in cleaning supplies can cause skin, eye, nose, and throat irritation, which can develop into dermatitis. VOCs in cleaning supplies can also cause more serious conditions, such as respiratory diseases and cancer. One study found that n-nonane and formaldehyde were the main drivers of eye and upper respiratory tract irritation while cancer risks were driven by chloroform and formaldehyde. Some solvent-based products have also been shown to cause damage to the kidneys and reproductive organs. One study showed that the star rating of the hotel may influence VOC exposure, as hotels with lower star ratings tend to have lower quality materials for the furnishings. Additionally, due to a movement among higher-end hotels to be more environmentally friendly, there has been a shift to using less harsh cleaning agents.

Another similar environment that exposes workers to VOCs are retail spaces. Studies have shown that retail spaces have the highest VOC concentrations compared to all other indoor spaces such as residences, offices, and vehicles. The concentration of VOCs present as well as the types depend on the type of store, but common sources of VOCs in retail spaces include motor vehicle exhaust, building materials, cleaning products, products, and fragrances. One study found that VOC concentrations were higher in retail storage spaces compared to the sales areas, particularly formaldehyde. In retail spaces, formaldehyde concentrations ranged from 8.0 to 19.4 μg/m^{3} compared to 14.2 to 45.0 μg/m^{3} in storage spaces. Occupational exposure to VOCs also depends on the task. One study found that workers were exposed to peak total VOC concentrations when they were removing the plastic film off of new products. This peak was 7 times higher than total VOC concentration peaks of all other tasks, contributing greatly to retail workers' exposure to VOCs despite being a relatively short task.

One way that VOC concentrations can be kept minimal within retail and hospitality is by ensuring there is proper air ventilation. Employers can ensure proper ventilation by placing furniture in a way that enhances air circulation, as well as checking that the HVAC (heating, ventilation, and air conditioning) system is working properly to remove pollutants from the air. Workers can make sure that air vents are not blocked.

== Analytical methods ==
=== Sampling ===
Obtaining samples for analysis is challenging. VOCs, even when at dangerous levels, are dilute, so preconcentration is typically required. Many components of the atmosphere are mutually incompatible, e.g. ozone and organic compounds, peroxyacyl nitrates and many organic compounds. Furthermore, collection of VOCs by condensation in cold traps also accumulates a large amount of water, which generally must be removed selectively, depending on the analytical techniques to be employed. Solid-phase microextraction (SPME) techniques are used to collect VOCs at low concentrations for analysis. As applied to breath analysis, the following modalities are employed for sampling: gas sampling bags, syringes, evacuated steel and glass containers.

=== Principle and measurement methods ===
In the U.S., standard methods have been established by the National Institute for Occupational Safety and Health (NIOSH) and another by U.S. OSHA. Each method uses a single component solvent; butanol and hexane cannot be sampled, however, on the same sample matrix using the NIOSH or OSHA method.

VOCs are quantified and identified by two broad techniques. The major technique is gas chromatography (GC). GC instruments allow the separation of gaseous components. When coupled to a flame ionization detector (FID) GCs can detect hydrocarbons at the parts per trillion levels. Using electron capture detectors, GCs are also effective for organohalide such as chlorocarbons.

The second major technique associated with VOC analysis is mass spectrometry, which is usually coupled with GC, giving the hyphenated technique of GC-MS.

Direct injection mass spectrometry techniques are frequently utilized for the rapid detection and accurate quantification of VOCs. PTR-MS is among the methods that have been used most extensively for the on-line analysis of biogenic and anthropogenic VOCs. PTR-MS instruments based on time-of-flight mass spectrometry have been reported to reach detection limits of 20 pptv after 100 ms and 750 ppqv after 1 min. measurement (signal integration) time. The mass resolution of these devices is between 7000 and 10,500 m/Δm, thus it is possible to separate most common isobaric VOCs and quantify them independently.

=== Chemical fingerprinting and breath analysis ===
The exhaled human breath contains a few thousand volatile organic compounds and is used in breath biopsy and is used in breath biopsy as a biomarker to test for diseases, such as lung cancer. One study has shown that "volatile organic compounds ... are mainly blood borne and therefore enable monitoring of different processes in the body." And it appears that VOC compounds in the body "may be either produced by metabolic processes or inhaled/absorbed from exogenous sources" such as environmental tobacco smoke. Chemical fingerprinting and breath analysis of volatile organic compounds has also been demonstrated with chemical sensor arrays, which utilize pattern recognition for detection of component volatile organics in complex mixtures such as breath gas.

=== Metrology for VOC measurements ===
To achieve comparability of VOC measurements, reference standards traceable to SI units are required. For a number of VOCs gaseous reference standards are available from specialty gas suppliers or national metrology institutes, either in the form of cylinders or dynamic generation methods. However, for many VOCs, such as oxygenated VOCs, monoterpenes, or formaldehyde, no standards are available at the appropriate amount of fraction due to the chemical reactivity or adsorption of these molecules. Currently, several national metrology institutes are working on the lacking standard gas mixtures at trace level concentration, minimising adsorption processes, and improving the zero gas. The final scopes are for the traceability and the long-term stability of the standard gases to be in accordance with the data quality objectives (DQO, maximum uncertainty of 20% in this case) required by the WMO/GAW program.

== See also ==
- Aroma compound
- Criteria air contaminants
- Fugitive emission
- Non-methane volatile organic compound
- Organic compound
- Trichloroethylene
- Vapor intrusion
- VOC contamination of groundwater
- Volatile Organic Compounds Protocol
