= Outgassing =

Release of a gas that was inside of some material

Outgassing (sometimes called offgassing, particularly when in reference to indoor air quality) is the release of a gas that was dissolved, trapped, frozen, or absorbed in some material. Outgassing can include sublimation and evaporation (which are phase transitions of a substance into a gas), as well as desorption, seepage from cracks or internal volumes, and gaseous products of slow chemical reactions. Boiling is generally thought of as a separate phenomenon from outgassing because it consists of a phase transition of a liquid into a vapor of the same substance.

== In a vacuum ==
Outgassing is a challenge to creating and maintaining clean high-vacuum environments. NASA and ESA maintain lists of materials with low-outgassing properties suitable for use in spacecraft, as outgassing products can condense onto optical elements, thermal radiators, or solar cells and obscure them. Materials not normally considered absorbent can release enough lightweight molecules to interfere with industrial or scientific vacuum processes. Moisture, sealants, lubricants, and adhesives are the most common sources, but even metals and glasses can release gases from cracks or impurities. The rate of outgassing increases at higher temperatures because the vapor pressure and rate of chemical reaction increases. For most solid materials, the method of manufacture and preparation can reduce the level of outgassing significantly. Cleaning of surfaces, or heating of individual components or the entire assembly (a process called "bake-out") can drive off volatiles.

NASA's Stardust space probe suffered reduced image quality due to an unknown contaminant that had condensed on the CCD sensor of the navigation camera. A similar problem affected the Cassini space probe's Narrow Angle Camera, but was corrected by repeatedly heating the system to 4 °C. A comprehensive characterisation of outgassing effects using mass spectrometers could be obtained for ESA's Rosetta spacecraft.

Natural outgassing is commonplace in comets.

== From rock ==
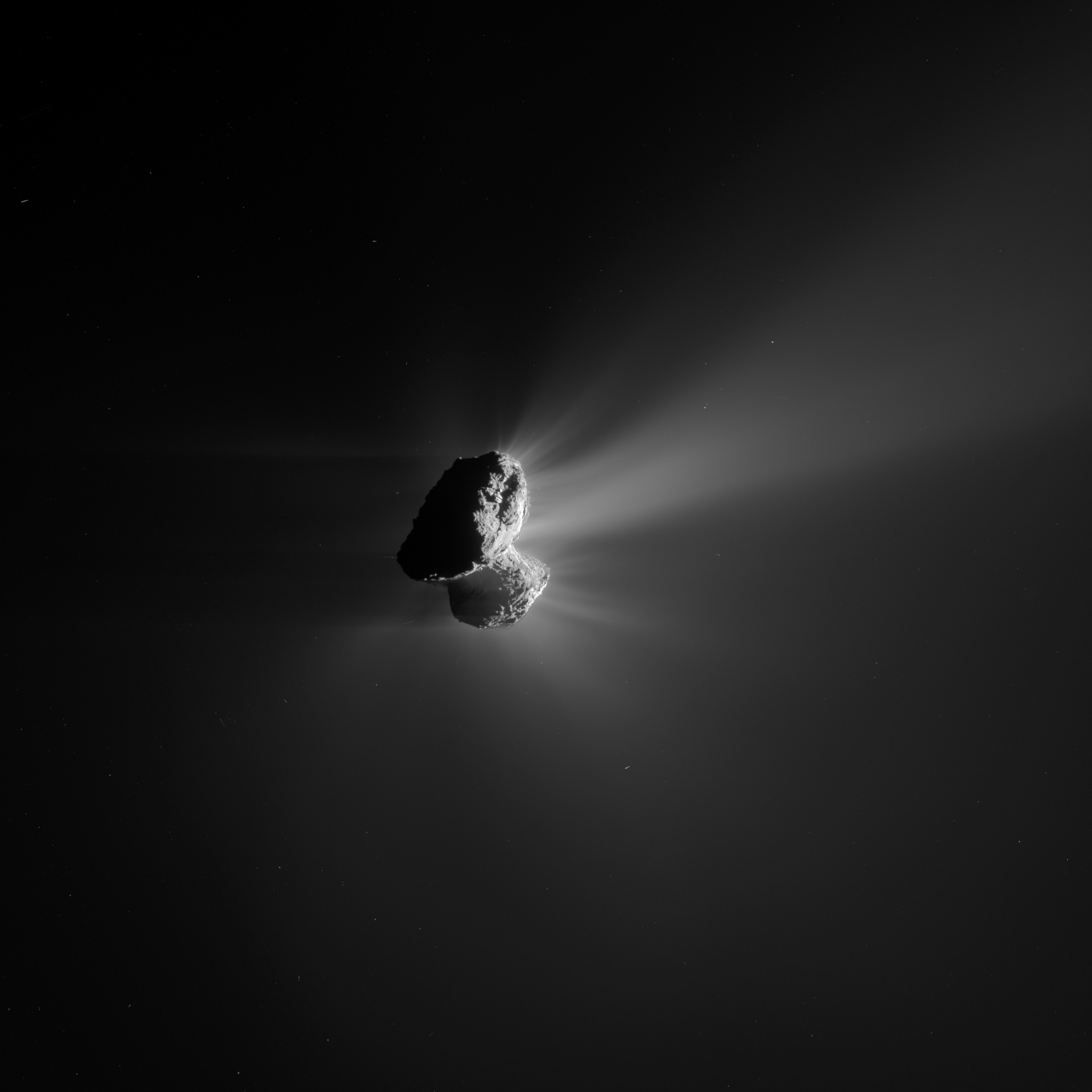
Comet 67P outgassing jets of gas and dust.

Outgassing is a possible source of many tenuous atmospheres of terrestrial planets or moons. Many materials are volatile relative to the extreme vacuum of outer space, and may evaporate or even boil at ambient temperature. Materials on the lunar surface have completely outgassed and been blown away by the solar wind long ago, but volatile materials may remain at depth. The lunar atmosphere probably originates from outgassing of warm material below the surface.

Once released, gases almost always are less dense than the surrounding rocks and sand and seep toward the surface. Explosive eruptions of volcanoes result from water or other volatiles outgassed from magma being trapped, for example by a lava dome. At the Earth's tectonic divergent boundaries where new crust is being created, helium and carbon dioxide are some of the volatiles being outgassed from mantle magma. Alpha decay of primordial radionuclides (and their decay products) produces the vast majority of the helium that continues to gas out of rocks on terrestrial planets.

Rocks containing radium-226 such as uranium ores, phosphate rock, shales, igneous and metamorphic rocks such as granite, gneiss, and schist may outgas radioactive radon necessitating radon mitigation.

== In a closed environment ==
Outgassing can be significant if it collects in a closed environment where air is stagnant or recirculated. For example, new car smell consists of outgassed chemicals released by heat in a closed automobile. Even a nearly odorless material such as wood may build up a strong smell if kept in a closed box for months. There is some concern that plasticizers and solvents released from many industrial products, especially plastics, may be harmful to human health. Long-term exposure to solvent vapors can cause chronic solvent-induced encephalopathy (CSE). Outgassing toxic gases are of great concern in the design of submarines and space stations, which must have self-contained recirculated atmospheres.

== In construction ==
The outgassing of small pockets of air near the surface of setting concrete can lead to permanent holes in the structure (called bugholes) that may compromise its structural integrity.

== See also ==
- Lake Nyos Disaster
- Materials for use in vacuum
- Volatile organic compound
- Comet
