= Gary G. Lash =

American geologist and member of AAPG

Gary George Lash
- Education: Kutztown University; Lehigh University (MS and PhD)
- Known for: Marcellus Shale calculations
- Spouse: Eileen Lash
- Awards: FP Top 100 Global Thinkers; John T. Galey Memorial Award
- Scientific career
- Fields: Geoscience

Gary Lash is an American geologist and member of AAPG. He was a professor emeritus at SUNY Fredonia and former adjunct professor at the University at Buffalo. He nominated by Foreign Policy for 2011 FP Top 100 Global Thinkers with Dr. Terry Engelder. In 2019, Dr. Lash received the John T. Galey Memorial Award from the American Association of Petroleum Geologists.
