= 1,2,3-Trichloropropane =

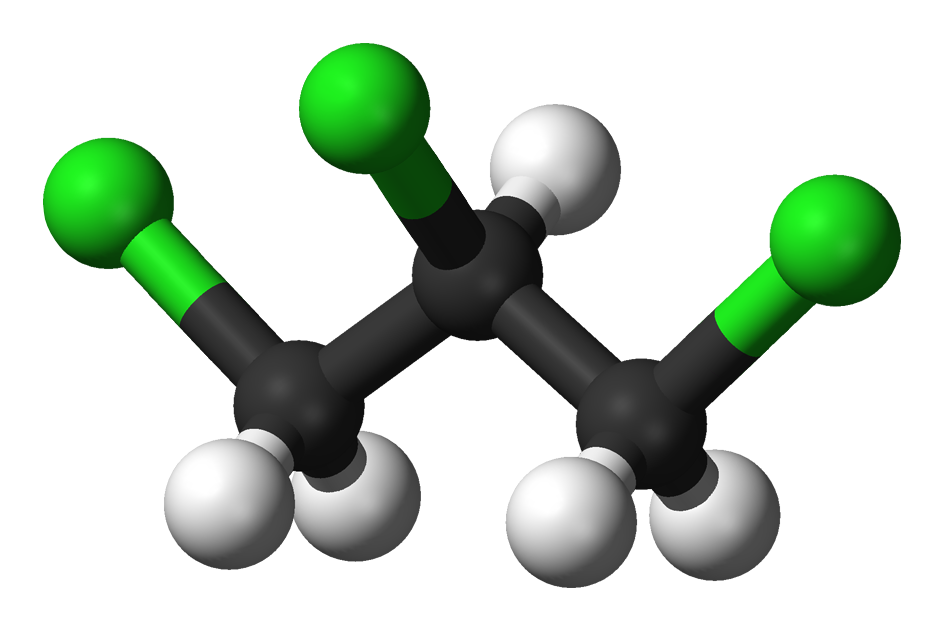

Names
- Preferred IUPAC name 1,2,3-Trichloropropane
- Other names TCP; Allyl trichloride Glycerol trichlorohydrin Trichlorohydrin

Identifiers
CAS Number	96-18-4
3D model (JSmol)	Interactive image
Abbreviations	TCP
ChEBI	CHEBI:34036
ChEMBL	ChEMBL346933
ChemSpider	7013
ECHA InfoCard	100.002.261
EC Number	202-486-1
KEGG	C14400
PubChem CID	7285
RTECS number	TZ9275000
UNII	3MJ7QCK0Z0
UN number	2810
CompTox Dashboard (EPA)	DTXSID9021390
- InChI: InChI=1S/C3H5Cl3/c4-1-3(6)2-5/h3H,1-2H2 Key: CFXQEHVMCRXUSD-UHFFFAOYSA-N
- SMILES: ClCC(Cl)CCl

Properties
Chemical formula	C_{3}H_{5}Cl_{3}
Molar mass	147.43 g
Appearance	colorless or straw yellow transparent liquid
Odor	chloroform-like
Density	1.387g/mL
Melting point	−14 °C (7 °F; 259 K)
Boiling point	156.85 °C (314.33 °F; 430.00 K)
Solubility in water	1,750 mg/L
log P	2.27
Vapor pressure	3 mmHg (20°C)
Henry's law constant (k_{H})	4.087 x 10^{−4}

Hazards
- GHS labelling
Pictograms	(GHS07: Exclamation mark) (GHS08: Health hazard)
Signal word	Warning
Hazard statements	H302, H312, H332, H350, H360F
Precautionary statements	P201, P202, P261, P264, P270, P271, P280, P281, P301+P312, P302+P352, P304+P312, P304+P340, P308+P313, P312, P322, P330, P363, P405, P501
Flash point	71 °C; 160 °F; 344 K
Explosive limits	3.2%-12.6%
- Lethal dose or concentration (LD, LC)
LC_{50} (median concentration)	555 ppm (mouse, 2 hr)
LC_{Lo} (lowest published)	5000 ppm (mouse, 20 min)
- NIOSH (US health exposure limits)
PEL (Permissible)	TWA 50 ppm (300 mg/m^{3})
REL (Recommended)	Ca TWA 10 ppm (60 mg/m^{3}) [skin]
IDLH (Immediate danger)	Ca [100 ppm]
- Except where otherwise noted, data are given for materials in their standard state (at 25 °C [77 °F], 100 kPa). verify (what is ?) Infobox references

1,2,3-Trichloropropane (TCP) is an organic compound with the formula CHCl(CH_{2}Cl)_{2}. It is a colorless liquid that is used as a solvent and in other specialty applications.

== Production ==
1,2,3-Trichloropropane is produced by the addition of chlorine to allyl chloride. TCP also may be produced as a by-product also is produced in significant quantities as an unwanted by-product of the production of other chlorinated compounds such as epichlorohydrin and dichloropropene.

== Uses ==
Historically, TCP has been used as a paint or varnish remover, a cleaning and degreasing agent, an anaesthetic and a solvent. It is also used as an intermediate in the production of hexafluoropropylene. It is a crosslinking agent for polysulfide polymers and sealants.

== Effects of exposure ==
Humans can be exposed to TCP by inhaling its fumes or through skin contact and ingestion. TCP is recognized in California as a human carcinogen, and extensive animal studies have shown that it causes cancer. Short term exposure to TCP can cause throat and eye irritation and can affect muscle coordination and concentration. Long term exposure can affect body weight and kidney function.

== Regulation ==
=== United States ===
==== Proposed federal regulation ====
As of 2013 TCP was not regulated as a contaminant by the federal government, but research shows that it could have severe health effects; only the state of California had significant regulation of this compound.

In a drinking water project proposed by the United States Environmental Protection Agency (EPA), TCP was one of sixteen suspected human carcinogens being considered for regulation in 2011.

==== State regulation ====
Pre-1980s, agricultural use of chloropropane-containing soil fumigants for use as pesticides and nematicides was prevalent in the United States. Some soil fumigants, which contained a mixture of primarily 1,3-dichloropropene and 1,2-dichloropropane, and in which 1,2,3-TCP was a minor component, e.g., trade name of D-D, were marketed for the cultivation of various crops including citrus fruits, pineapples, soy beans, cotton, tomatoes, and potatoes. D-D was first marketed in 1943, but is no longer available in the United States, and has been replaced with Telone II, which was first available in 1956. Telone II reportedly contains as much as 99 percent 1,3-dichloropropene and up to 0.17 percent by weight 1,2,3-TCP (Zebarth et al., 1998). Before 1978, approximately 55 million pounds/year of 1,3-dichloropropene were produced annually in the United States, and approximately 20 million pounds/year of 1,2-dichloropropane and 1,2,3-TCP were produced as by-products in the production of 1,3-dichloropropene. Over 2 million pounds of pesticides containing 1,3-dichloropropene were used in California alone in 1978. Telone II is still used for vegetables, field crops, fruit and nut trees, grapes, nursery crops, and cotton.

The California State Water Resources Control Board's Division of Drinking Water established an enforceable Maximum Contaminant Level (MCL) of 5 ng/L (parts per trillion). The state of Alaska has promulgated standards establishing cleanup levels for 1,2,3-trichloropropane contamination in soils and groundwater. The state of California considers 1,2,3-trichloropropane to be a regulated contaminant that must be monitored. The state of Colorado has also promulgated a groundwater standard although there is no drinking water standard. Although there is not much regulation on this substance, it has proved that TCP is a carcinogen in laboratory mice, and most likely a human carcinogen as well. On a federal scale, there is no MCL for this contaminant. The Permissible Exposure Limit (PEL) in occupational setting for air is 50 ppm or 300 mg/m^{3}. The concentration in air at which TCP becomes an Immediate Danger to Life and Health (IDLH) is at 100 ppm. These regulations were reviewed in 2009.

== TCP as an emerging contaminant ==
TCP does not readily adsorb to soil based on its low soil organic carbon-water partition coefficient (K_{oc}). Instead, it is likely to rapidly either leach from soil into groundwater or evaporate from soil surfaces. Because TCP is more dense than water, in groundwater aquifers, it would be more likely found at the interface with shallower higher permeability soil stratum and the next deeper low permeability soil stratum. This makes TCP in its pure form a DNAPL (Dense Nonaqueous Phase Liquid) and it can be more difficult to remediate groundwater. TCP has been shown to undergo biodegradation under anaerobic conditions via reductive dechlorination by Dehalogenimonas (Dhg) species. However, the degradation is typically slower than for other volatile organic compounds. Groundwater remediation of TCP can occur through in situ chemical oxidation, permeable reactive barriers, and other remediation techniques. Several TCP remediation strategies have been studied and/or applied with varying degrees of success. These include extraction with granular activated carbon, in situ chemical oxidation, and in situ chemical reduction. Recent studies suggest that reduction with zerovalent metals, particularly zerovalent zinc, may be particularly effective in TCP remediation. Bioremediation may also be a promising clean-up technique.
