= Nanoremediation =

Environmental remediation process

Nanoremediation is the use of nanoparticles for environmental remediation. It is being explored to treat ground water, wastewater, soil, sediment, or other contaminated environmental materials. Nanoremediation is an emerging industry; by 2009, nanoremediation technologies had been documented in at least 44 cleanup sites around the world, predominantly in the United States. In Europe, nanoremediation is being investigated by the EC funded NanoRem Project. A report produced by the NanoRem consortium has identified around 70 nanoremediation projects worldwide at pilot or full scale. During nanoremediation, a nanoparticle agent must be brought into contact with the target contaminant under conditions that allow a detoxifying or immobilizing reaction. This process typically involves a pump-and-treat process or in situ application.

Some nanoremediation methods, particularly the use of nano zero-valent iron for groundwater cleanup, have been deployed at full-scale cleanup sites. Other methods remain in research phases.

== Applications ==
Nanoremediation has been most widely used for groundwater treatment, with additional extensive research in wastewater treatment. Nanoremediation has also been tested for soil and sediment cleanup. Even more preliminary research is exploring the use of nanoparticles to remove toxic materials from gases.

=== Groundwater remediation ===
Currently, groundwater remediation is the most common commercial application of nanoremediation technologies. Using nanomaterials, especially zero-valent metals (ZVMs), for groundwater remediation is an emerging approach that is promising due to the availability and effectiveness of many nanomaterials for degrading or sequestering contaminants.

Nanotechnology offers the potential to effectively treat contaminants in situ, avoiding excavation or the need to pump contaminated water out of the ground. The process begins with nanoparticles being injected into a contaminated aquifer via an injection well. The nanoparticles are then transported by groundwater flow to the source of contamination. Upon contact, nanoparticles can sequester contaminants (via adsorption or complexation), immobilizing them, or they can degrade the contaminants to less harmful compounds. Contaminant transformations are typically redox reactions. When the nanoparticle is the oxidant or reductant, it is considered reactive.

The ability to inject nanoparticles to the subsurface and transport them to the contaminant source is imperative for successful treatment. Reactive nanoparticles can be injected into a well where they will then be transported down gradient to the contaminated area. Drilling and packing a well is quite expensive. Direct push wells cost less than drilled wells and are the most often used delivery tool for remediation with nanoiron. A nanoparticle slurry can be injected along the vertical range of the probe to provide treatment to specific aquifer regions.

=== Surface water treatment ===
The use of various nanomaterials, including carbon nanotubes and TiO_{2}, shows promise for treatment of surface water, including for purification, disinfection, and desalination. Target contaminants in surface waters include heavy metals, organic contaminants, and pathogens. In this context, nanoparticles may be used as sorbents, as reactive agents (photocatalysts or redox agents), or in membranes used for nanofiltration.

=== Trace contaminant detection ===
Nanoparticles may assist in detecting trace levels of contaminants in field settings, contributing to effective remediation. Instruments that can operate outside of a laboratory often are not sensitive enough to detect trace contaminants. Rapid, portable, and cost-effective measurement systems for trace contaminants in groundwater and other environmental media would thus enhance contaminant detection and cleanup. One potential method is to separate the analyte from the sample and concentrate them to a smaller volume, easing detection and measurement. When small quantities of solid sorbents are used to absorb the target for concentration, this method is referred to as solid-phase microextraction.

With their high reactivity and large surface area, nanoparticles may be effective sorbents to help concentrate target contaminants for solid-phase microextraction, particularly in the form of self-assembled monolayers on mesoporous supports. The mesoporous silica structure, made through a surfactant templated sol-gel process, gives these self-assembled monolayers high surface area and a rigid open pore structure. This material may be an effective sorbent for many targets, including heavy metals such as mercury, lead, and cadmium, chromate and arsenate, and radionuclides such as ^{99}Tc, ^{137}CS, uranium, and the actinides.

== Mechanism ==
The small size of nanoparticles leads to several characteristics that may enhance remediation. Nanomaterials are highly reactive because of their high surface area per unit mass. Their small particle size also allows nanoparticles to enter small pores in soil or sediment that larger particles might not penetrate, granting them access to contaminants sorbed to soil and increasing the likelihood of contact with the target contaminant.

Because nanomaterials are so tiny, their movement is largely governed by Brownian motion as compared to gravity. Thus, the flow of groundwater can be sufficient to transport the particles. Nanoparticles then can remain suspended in solution longer to establish an in situ treatment zone.

Once a nanoparticle contacts the contaminant, it may degrade the contaminant, typically through a redox reaction, or adsorb to the contaminant to immobilize it. In some cases, such as with magnetic nano-iron, adsorbed complexes may be separated from the treated substrate, removing the contaminant. Target contaminants include organic molecules such as pesticides or organic solvents and metals such as arsenic or lead. Some research is also exploring the use of nanoparticles to remove excessive nutrients such as nitrogen and phosphorus.

== Materials ==
A variety of compounds, including some that are used as macro-sized particles for remediation, are being studied for use in nanoremediation. These materials include zero-valent metals like zero-valent iron, calcium carbonate, carbon-based compounds such as graphene or carbon nanotubes, and metal oxides such as titanium dioxide and iron oxide.

=== Nano zero-valent iron ===
As of 2012, nano zero-valent iron (nZVI) was the nanoscale material most commonly used in bench and field remediation tests. nZVI may be mixed or coated with another metal, such as palladium, silver, or copper, that acts as a catalyst in what is called a bimetallic nanoparticle. nZVI may also be emulsified with a surfactant and an oil, creating a membrane that enhances the nanoparticle's ability to interact with hydrophobic liquids and protects it against reactions with materials dissolved in water. Commercial nZVI particle sizes may sometimes exceed true “nano” dimensions (100 nm or less in diameter).

nZVI appears to be useful for degrading organic contaminants, including chlorinated organic compounds such as polychlorinated biphenyls (PCBs) and trichloroethene (TCE), as well as immobilizing or removing metals. nZVI and other nanoparticles that do not require light can be injected belowground into the contaminated zone for in situ groundwater remediation and, potentially, soil remediation.

nZVI nanoparticles can be prepared by using sodium borohydride as the key reductant. NaBH_{4} (0.2 M) is added into FeCl_{3}•6H_{2} (0.05 M) solution (~1:1 volume ratio). Ferric iron is reduced via the following reaction:

4Fe^{3+} + 3BH^{−}_{4} + 9H_{2}O → 4Fe^{0} + 3H_{2}BO^{−}_{3} + 12H^{+} + 6H_{2}

Palladized Fe particles are prepared by soaking the nanoscale iron particles with an ethanol solution of 1wt% of palladium acetate ([Pd(C_{2}H_{3}O_{2})2]_{3}). This causes the reduction and deposition of Pd on the Fe surface:

Pd^{2+} + Fe ^{0} → Pd^{0} + Fe^{2+}

Similar methods may be used to prepared Fe/Pt, Fe/Ag, Fe/Ni, Fe/Co, and Fe/Cu bimetallic particles. With the above methods, nanoparticles of diameter 50-70 nm may be produced. The average specific surface area of Pd/Fe particles is about 35 m^{2}/g. Ferrous iron salt has also been successfully used as the precursor.

=== Titanium dioxide ===
Titanium dioxide (TiO_{2}) is also a leading candidate for nanoremediation and wastewater treatment, although as of 2010 it is reported to have not yet been expanded to full-scale commercialization. When exposed to ultraviolet light, such as in sunlight, titanium dioxide produces hydroxyl radicals, which are highly reactive and can oxidize contaminants. Hydroxyl radicals are used for water treatment in methods generally termed advanced oxidation processes. Because light is required for this reaction, TiO_{2} is not appropriate for underground in situ remediation, but it may be used for wastewater treatment or pump-and-treat groundwater remediation.

TiO_{2} is inexpensive, chemically stable, and insoluble in water. TiO_{2} has a wide band gap energy (3.2 eV) that requires the use of UV light, as opposed to visible light only, for photocatalytic activation. To enhance the efficiency of its photocatalysis, research has investigated modifications to TiO_{2} or alternative photocatalysts that might use a greater portion of photons in the visible light spectrum. Potential modifications include doping TiO_{2} with metals, nitrogen, or carbon.

== Challenges ==
When using in situ remediation the reactive products must be considered for two reasons. One reason is that a reactive product might be more harmful or mobile than the parent compound. Another reason is that the products can affect the effectiveness and/or cost of remediation. TCE (trichloroethylene), under reducing conditions by nanoiron, may sequentially dechlorinate to DCE (dichloroethene) and VC (vinyl chloride). VC is known to be more harmful than TCE, meaning this process would be undesirable.

Nanoparticles also react with non-target compounds. Bare nanoparticles tend to clump together and also react rapidly with soil, sediment, or other material in ground water. For in situ remediation, this action inhibits the particles from dispersing in the contaminated area, reducing their effectiveness for remediation. Coatings or other treatment may allow nanoparticles to disperse farther and potentially reach a greater portion of the contaminated zone. Coatings for nZVI include surfactants, polyelectrolyte coatings, emulsification layers, and protective shells made from silica or carbon.

Such designs may also affect the nanoparticles’ ability to react with contaminants, their uptake by organisms, and their toxicity. A continuing area of research involves the potential for nanoparticles used for remediation to disperse widely and harm wildlife, plants, or people.

In some cases, bioremediation may be used deliberately at the same site or with the same material as nanoremediation. Ongoing research is investigating how nanoparticles may interact with simultaneous biological remediation.

== See also ==
- Green nanotechnology
- Nanofiltration
