= Bioremediation =

Process used to treat contaminated media such as water and soil

Bioremediation broadly refers to any process wherein a biological system (typically bacteria, microalgae, fungi in mycoremediation, and plants in phytoremediation), living or dead, is employed for removing environmental pollutants from air, water, soil, fuel gasses, industrial effluents etc., in natural or artificial settings. The natural ability of organisms to absorb, accumulate, and degrade common and emerging pollutants has attracted the use of biological resources in treatment of contaminated environment. In comparison to conventional physicochemical treatment methods bioremediation may offer advantages as it aims to be sustainable, eco-friendly, cheap, and scalable.

Most bioremediation is inadvertent, involving native organisms. Research on bioremediation is heavily focused on stimulating the process by inoculation of a polluted site with organisms or supplying nutrients to promote their growth. Environmental remediation is an alternative to bioremediation.

While organic pollutants are susceptible to biodegradation, heavy metals cannot be degraded, but rather oxidized or reduced. Typical bioremediations involves oxidations. Oxidations enhance the water-solubility of organic compounds and their susceptibility to further degradation by further oxidation and hydrolysis. Ultimately biodegradation converts hydrocarbons to carbon dioxide and water. For heavy metals, bioremediation offers few solutions. Metal-containing pollutant can be removed, at least partially, with varying bioremediation techniques. The main challenge to bioremediations is rate: the processes are slow.

Bioremediation techniques can be classified as (i) in situ techniques, which treat polluted sites directly, vs (ii) ex situ techniques which are applied to excavated materials. In both these approaches, additional nutrients, vitamins, minerals, and pH buffers are added to enhance the growth and metabolism of the microorganisms. In some cases, specialized microbial cultures are added (biostimulation). Some examples of bioremediation related technologies are phytoremediation, bioventing, bioattenuation, biosparging, composting (biopiles and windrows), and landfarming. Other remediation techniques include thermal desorption, vitrification, air stripping, bioleaching, rhizofiltration, and soil washing. Biological treatment, bioremediation, is a similar approach used to treat wastes including wastewater, industrial waste and solid waste. The end goal of bioremediation is to remove harmful compounds to improve soil and water quality.

== Techniques ==
=== In situ techniques ===
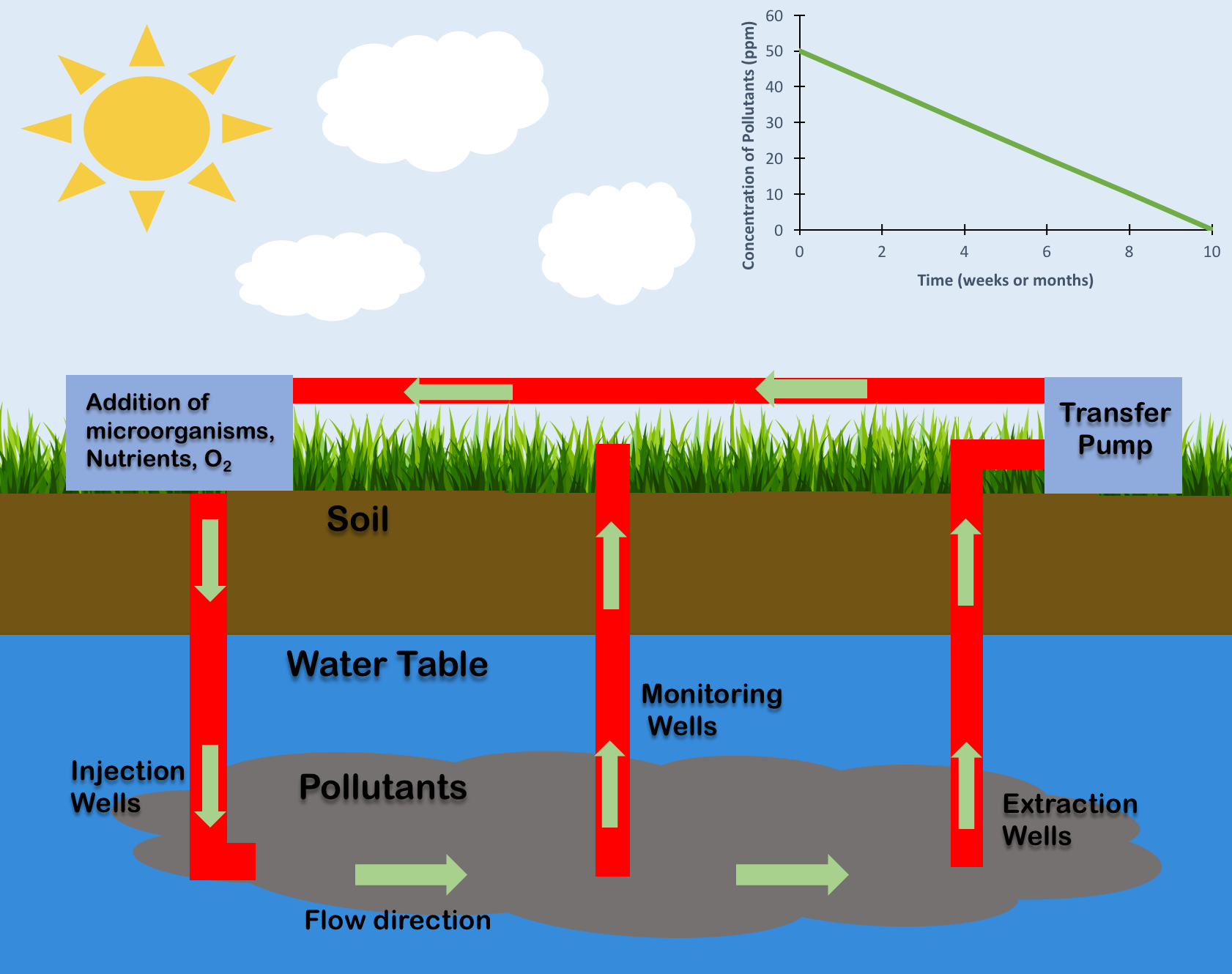
Visual representation showing in-situ bioremediation. This process involves the addition of oxygen, nutrients, or microbes into contaminated soil to remove toxic pollutants. Contamination includes buried waste and underground pipe leakage that infiltrate ground water systems. The addition of oxygen removes the pollutants by producing carbon dioxide and water.

==== Bioventing ====
Bioventing is a process that increases the oxygen or air flow into the unsaturated zone of the soil, this in turn increases the rate of natural in situ degradation of the targeted hydrocarbon contaminant. Bioventing, an aerobic bioremediation, is the most common form of oxidative bioremediation process where oxygen is provided as the electron acceptor for oxidation of petroleum, polyaromatic hydrocarbons (PAHs), phenols, and other reduced pollutants. Oxygen is generally the preferred electron acceptor because of the higher energy yield and because oxygen is required for some enzyme systems to initiate the degradation process. Microorganisms can degrade a wide variety of hydrocarbons, including components of gasoline, kerosene, diesel, and jet fuel. Under ideal aerobic conditions, the biodegradation rates of the low- to moderate-weight aliphatic, alicyclic, and aromatic compounds can be very high. As molecular weight of the compound increases, the resistance to biodegradation increases simultaneously. This results in higher contaminated volatile compounds due to their high molecular weight and an increased difficulty to remove from the environment.

Most bioremediation processes involve oxidation-reduction reactions where either an electron acceptor (commonly oxygen) is added to stimulate oxidation of a reduced pollutant (e.g. hydrocarbons) or an electron donor (commonly an organic substrate) is added to reduce oxidized pollutants (nitrate, perchlorate, oxidized metals, chlorinated solvents, explosives and propellants). In both these approaches, additional nutrients, vitamins, minerals, and pH buffers may be added to optimize conditions for the microorganisms. In some cases, specialized microbial cultures are added (bioaugmentation) to further enhance biodegradation.

Approaches for oxygen addition below the water table include recirculating aerated water through the treatment zone, addition of pure oxygen or peroxides, and air sparging. Recirculation systems typically consist of a combination of injection wells or galleries and one or more recovery wells where the extracted groundwater is treated, oxygenated, amended with nutrients and re-injected. However, the amount of oxygen that can be provided by this method is limited by the low solubility of oxygen in water (8 to 10 mg/L for water in equilibrium with air at typical temperatures). Greater amounts of oxygen can be provided by contacting the water with pure oxygen or addition of hydrogen peroxide (H_{2}O_{2}) to the water. In some cases, slurries of solid calcium or magnesium peroxide are injected under pressure through soil borings. These solid peroxides react with water releasing H_{2}O_{2} which then decomposes releasing oxygen. Air sparging involves the injection of air under pressure below the water table. The air injection pressure must be great enough to overcome the hydrostatic pressure of the water and resistance to air flow through the soil.

==== Biostimulation ====
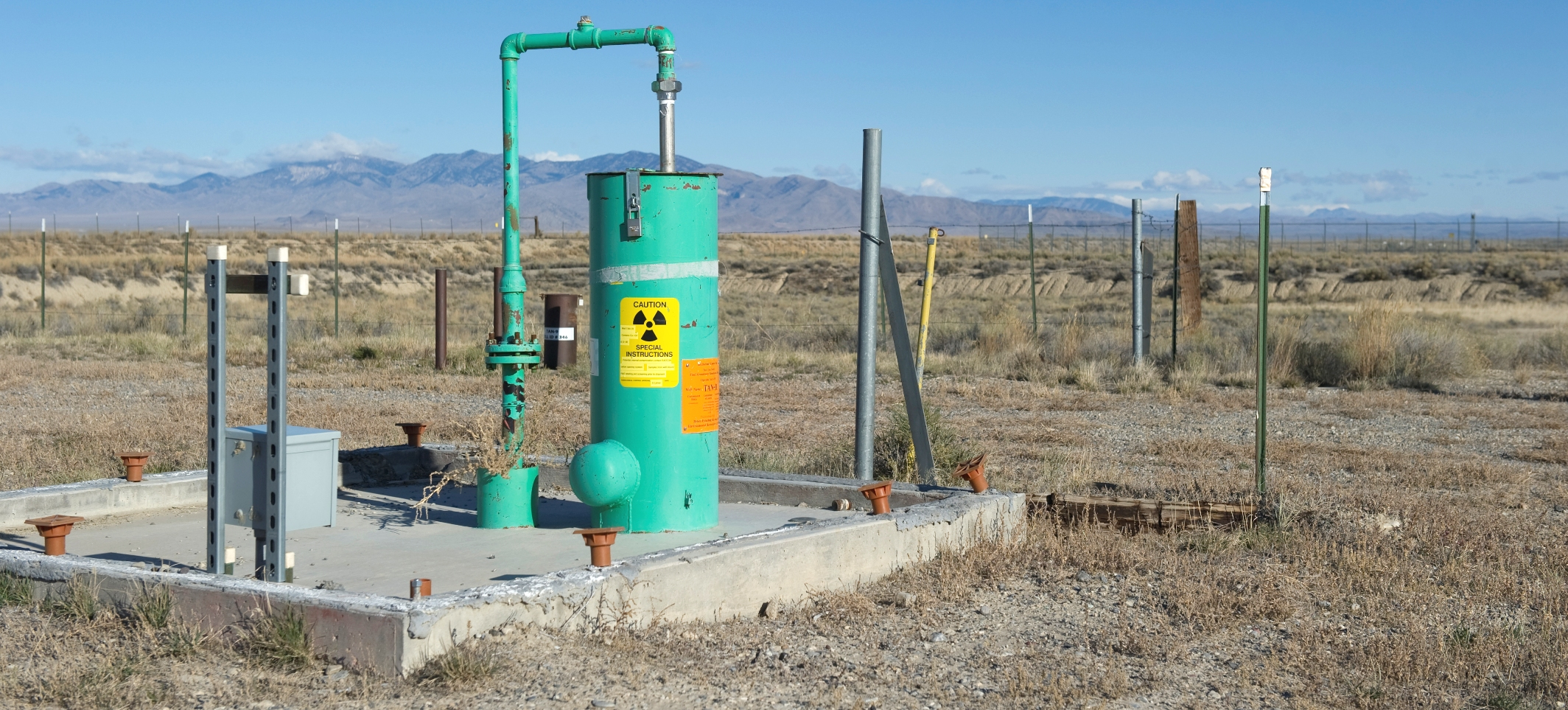
An example of biostimulation at the Snake River Plain Aquifer in Idaho. This process involves the addition of whey powder to promote the utilization of naturally present bacteria. Whey powder acts as a substrate to aid in the growth of bacteria. At this site, microorganisms break down the carcinogenic compound trichloroethylene (TCE), which is a process seen in previous studies.

Bioremediation can be carried out by bacteria that are naturally present. In biostimulation, the population of these helpful bacteria can be increased by adding nutrients.

Bacteria can in principle be used to degrade hydrocarbons. Specific to marine oil spills, nitrogen and phosphorus have been key nutrients in biodegradation. The bioremediation of hydrocarbons suffers from low rates.

Bioremediation can involve the action of microbial consortium. Within the consortium, the product of one species could be the substrate for another species.

Anaerobic bioremediation can in principle be employed to treat a range of oxidized contaminants including PCE, TCE, DCE, VC), chlorinated ethanes (TCA, DCA), chloromethanes (CT, CF), chlorinated cyclic hydrocarbons, various energetics (e.g., perchlorate, RDX, TNT), and nitrate. This process involves the addition of an electron donor to: 1) deplete background electron acceptors including oxygen, nitrate, oxidized iron and manganese and sulfate; and 2) stimulate the biological and/or chemical reduction of the oxidized pollutants. The choice of substrate and the method of injection depend on the contaminant type and distribution in the aquifer, hydrogeology, and remediation objectives. Substrate can be added using conventional well installations, by direct-push technology, or by excavation and backfill such as permeable reactive barriers (PRB) or biowalls. Slow-release products composed of edible oils or solid substrates tend to stay in place for an extended treatment period. Soluble substrates or soluble fermentation products of slow-release substrates can potentially migrate via advection and diffusion, providing broader but shorter-lived treatment zones. The added organic substrates are first fermented to hydrogen (H_{2}) and volatile fatty acids (VFAs). The VFAs, including acetate, lactate, propionate and butyrate, provide carbon and energy for bacterial metabolism.

Bioremediation is not specific to metals. In 2010 there was a massive oil spill in the Gulf of Mexico. Populations of bacteria and archaea were used to rejuvenate the coast after the oil spill. These microorganisms over time have developed metabolic networks that can utilize hydrocarbons such as oil and petroleum as a source of carbon and energy. Microbial bioremediation is a very effective modern technique for restoring natural systems by removing toxins from the environment.

==== Bioattenuation ====
During bioattenuation, biodegradation occurs naturally with the addition of nutrients or bacteria. The indigenous microbes present will determine the metabolic activity and act as a natural attenuation. While there is no anthropogenic involvement in bioattenuation, the contaminated site must still be monitored.

==== Biosparging ====
Biosparging is the process of groundwater remediation as oxygen, and possible nutrients, is injected. When oxygen is injected, indigenous bacteria are stimulated to increase rate of degradation. However, biosparging focuses on saturated contaminated zones, specifically related to ground water remediation.

UNICEF, power producers, bulk water suppliers, and local governments are early adopters of low cost bioremediation, such as aerobic bacteria tablets which are simply dropped into water.

=== Ex situ techniques ===
Ex situ techniques are often more expensive because of excavation and transportation costs to the treatment facility, while in situ techniques are performed at the site of contamination so they only have installation costs. While there is less cost there is also less of an ability to determine the scale and spread of the pollutant. The pollutant ultimately determines which bioremediation method to use. The depth and spread of the pollutant are other important factors.

==== Biopiles ====
Biopiles, similar to bioventing, are used to remove petroleum pollutants by increasing aerobic degradation to contaminated soils. However, the soil is excavated and piled with an aeration system. This aeration system enhances microbial activity by introducing oxygen under positive pressure or removes oxygen under negative pressure.

==== Windrows ====
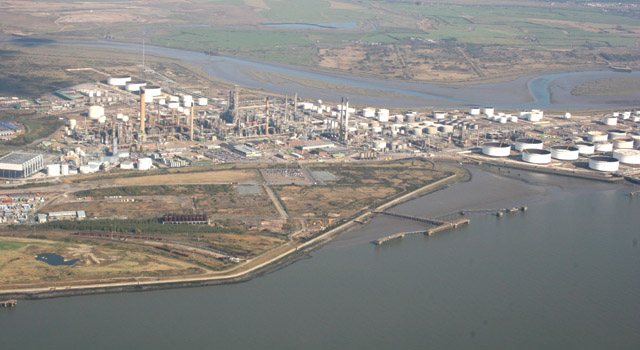
The former Shell Haven Refinery in Standford-le-Hope which underwent bioremediation to minimize the oil contaminated site. Bioremediation techniques, such as windrows, were used to promote oxygen transfer. The refinery has excavated approximately 115,000 m^{3} of contaminated soil.

Windrow systems are similar to compost techniques where soil is periodically turned in order to enhance aeration. This periodic turning also allows contaminants present in the soil to be uniformly distributed which accelerates the process of bioremediation.

==== Landfarming ====
Landfarming, or land treatment, is a method commonly used for sludge spills. This method disperses contaminated soil and aerates the soil by cyclically rotating. This process is an above land application and contaminated soils are required to be shallow in order for microbial activity to be stimulated. However, if the contamination is deeper than 5 feet, then the soil is required to be excavated to above ground. While it is an ex situ technique, it can also be considered an in situ technique as Landfarming can be performed at the site of contamination.

== Targeted pollutants ==
=== Heavy metals ===
Heavy metals are introduced into the environment by both anthropogenic activities and natural factors. Unlike organic pollutants, metals (or more properly, metal ions and metal compounds) cannot be degraded. Hyperaccumulating plants could in principle extract metals from soil, but this technology remains impractical. The mobility of the metals could be decreased, resulting in their immobilization. For example, reduction of the more mobile U(VI) species affords the less mobile U(IV) derivatives. Again, this approach remains more conceptual than practical.

=== Pesticides ===
Of the many ways to deal with pesticide contamination, bioremediation promises to be more effective. Many sites around the world are contaminated with agrichemicals. These agrichemicals often resist biodegradation, by design. Harming all manners of organic life with long-term health issues such as cancer, rashes, blindness, paralysis, and mental illness. An example is Lindane which was a commonly used insecticide in the 20th century. Long time exposure poses a serious threat to humans and the surrounding ecosystem. Lindane reduces the potential of beneficial bacteria in the soil such as nitrogen fixation cyanobacteria. As well as causing central nervous system issues in smaller mammals such as seizures, dizziness, and even death. What makes it so harmful to these organisms is how quickly distributed it gets through the brain and fatty tissues. While Lindane has been mostly limited to specific use, it is still produced and used around the world.

Actinobacteria has been a promising candidate in situ technique specifically for removing pesticides. When certain strains of Actinobacteria have been grouped together, their efficiency in degrading pesticides has enhanced. As well as being a reusable technique that strengthens through further use by limiting the migration space of these cells to target specific areas and not fully consume their cleansing abilities. Despite encouraging results, Actinobacteria has only been used in controlled lab settings and will need further development in finding the cost effectiveness and scalability of use.

== Limitations of bioremediation ==
Bioremediation is rarely employed to remediate pollutants. Heavy metals and radionuclides simply do not biodegrade, although in some cases, these metals can be immobilized. In some cases, microbes do not fully mineralize the pollutant, potentially producing a more toxic compound. For example, under anaerobic conditions, the reductive dehalogenation of TCE may produce dichloroethylene (DCE) and vinyl chloride (VC), which are suspected or known carcinogens. However, the microorganism Dehalococcoides can further reduce DCE and VC to the non-toxic product ethene. The molecular pathways for bioremediation are of considerable interest. In addition, knowing these pathways will help develop new technologies that can deal with sites that have uneven distributions of a mixture of contaminants.

Biodegradation requires microbial population with the metabolic capacity to degrade the pollutant in a suitable timeframe. The biological processes used by these microbes are highly specific, therefore, many environmental factors must be taken into account and regulated as well. It can be difficult to extrapolate the results from the small-scale test studies into big field operations. In many cases, bioremediation takes more time than other alternatives such as land filling and incineration. Another example is bioventing, which is inexpensive to bioremediate contaminated sites, however, this process is extensive and can take a few years to decontaminate a site.

Another major challeng is invasive species: indigenous species are preferred. The organism must be sufficiently plentiful to clean the site.

Pesticides are a top contributor to soil contamination and runoff contamination. Pesticides are difficult to biodegrade.

== Genetic engineering ==
The use of genetic engineering to create organisms specifically designed for bioremediation is under preliminary research. Two category of genes can be inserted in the organism: degradative genes, which encode proteins required for the degradation of pollutants, and reporter genes, which encode proteins able to monitor pollution levels. Numerous members of Pseudomonas have been modified with the lux gene for the detection of the polyaromatic hydrocarbon naphthalene. A field test for the release of the modified organism has been successful on a moderately large scale.

There are concerns surrounding release and containment of genetically modified organisms into the environment due to the potential of horizontal gene transfer. Genetically modified organisms are classified and controlled under the Toxic Substances Control Act of 1976 under United States Environmental Protection Agency. Measures have been created to address these concerns. Organisms can be modified such that they can only survive and grow under specific sets of environmental conditions. In addition, the tracking of modified organisms can be made easier with the insertion of bioluminescence genes for visual identification.

Genetically modified organisms have been created to treat oil spills and break down certain plastics (PET).

== See also ==
- Bioremediation of radioactive waste
- Biosurfactant
- Chelation
- Dutch pollutant standards
- Folkewall
- In situ chemical oxidation
- In situ chemical reduction
- List of environment topics
- Mega Borg Oil Spill
- Microbial biodegradation
- Mycoremediation
- Mycorrhizal bioremediation
- Pleurotus
- Phytoremediation
- Pseudomonas putida (used for degrading oil)
- Restoration ecology
- Xenocatabolism
