= In situ chemical reduction =

Environmental remediation technique

In situ chemical reduction (ISCR) is a proposed environmental remediation technique used for soil and/or groundwater remediation to lower the concentrations of targeted environmental contaminants to acceptable levels. It is the mirror process of In Situ Chemical Oxidation (ISCO). ISCR is usually applied in the environment by injecting reductive additives into the contaminated area or placing a solid medium of chemical reductants in the path of a contaminant plume. In mprinciple, ISCR can be used to remediate a variety of organic compounds, including some that are resistant to natural degradation.

The in situ in ISCR is Latin for "in place", signifying that ISCR is a chemical reduction reaction that occurs at the site of the contamination.

== History ==
Early work on ISCR examined the dechlorinations with copper. Substrates included DDT, endrin, chloroform, and hexachlorocyclopentadiene. Aluminum and magnesium behave similarly in the laboratory. Ground water treatment most generally focuses on the use of iron.

== Reductants ==
=== Zero valent metals (ZVMs) ===
Zero-valent metals are the main reductants used in ISCR. The most common metal used is iron, in the form of ZVI (zero valent iron), and it is also the metal longest in use. However, some studies show that zero valent zinc (ZVZ) could be up to ten times more effective at eradicating the contaminants than ZVI. Some applications of ZVMs are to clean up Trichloroethylene (TCE) and Hexavalent chromium (Cr(VI)). ZVMs are usually implemented by a permeable reactive barrier. For example, iron that has been embedded in a swellable, organically modified silica creates a permanent soft barrier underground to capture and reduce small, organic compounds as groundwater passes through it.

=== Iron minerals ===
Some iron minerals can be active for dechlorination. These minerals use Fe^{2+}. Particular minerals that can be used include green rust, magnetite, pyrite, and glauconite. The most reactive of the iron minerals are the iron sulfides and oxides. Pyrite, an iron sulfide, is able to dechlorinate carbon tetrachloride in suspension.

=== Polysulfides ===
Polysulfides have been tested on the field in treating TCE and in comparison to EHC. The use of polysulfides is a type of abiotic reduction and works best in anaerobic conditions where iron (III) is available. The benefit of using polysulfides is that they do not produce any biological waste products; however, the reaction rates are slow and they require more time to create the DVI (dual valent iron) minerals that are needed for the reduction to occur.

=== Dithionite ===
Dithionite (S_{2}O^{2−}_{4}) can also be used in ISCR. It is usually used in addition to iron reduce contaminants. A number of reactions take place and eventually the contaminant is removed. In the process, dithionite is consumed and the final product of all the reactions is 2 sulfur dioxide anions. The dithionite is not stable for a long period of time.

=== Bimetallic materials ===
Bimetallic materials are materials that are made out of two different metals or alloys that are tightly bonded together. A good example of a bimetallic material would be a bimetallic strip which is used in some kinds of thermometers. In ISCR, bimetallic materials are small pieces of metals that are coated lightly with a catalyst such as palladium, silver, or platinum. The catalyst drives a faster reaction and the small size of the particles allows them to effectively move into and remain in the target zone.

=== Proprietary materials ===
One proprietary material for ISCR is the EHC technology created by Adventus. This particular product is actually a mixture of carbon, nutrients, and zero-valent iron. The theory behind this product is that the carbon in the mixture will promote bacterial growth in the subsurface. The growing bacteria consume oxygen, which easily accepts electrons, present in the subsurface which increases reducing potential. The growing bacteria also ferment and produce fatty acids that act as electron donors to other bacteria and substances. Adventus uses this combination of biotic and abiotic processes to implement ISCR. EHC is injected as a "slurry" (a mixture that is 15 to 40% solids and weight with the rest being liquid) into the substratum.

Another material worth mentioning is EZVI (emulsified ZVI) which is a NASA technology. EZVI is used mainly to treat halogenated hydrocarbons and DNAPLs. EZVI is nanoscale iron that is placed into a biodegradable oil emulsion. The emulsion is then injected into the substratum.

== Reactions in ISCR ==
=== Reductive processes ===
In ISCR, many reductive processes can take place. There are hydrogenolysis, β-elimination, hydrogenation, α-elimination, and electron transfer. The specific combination of reductive processes that actually take place in the subsurface depends on the species of contaminant that is present and also the type of reduction being used. The natural and biological processes that take place in the substratum also affect the kinds of reductive processes that are found.

=== Surface catalyzed reactions ===
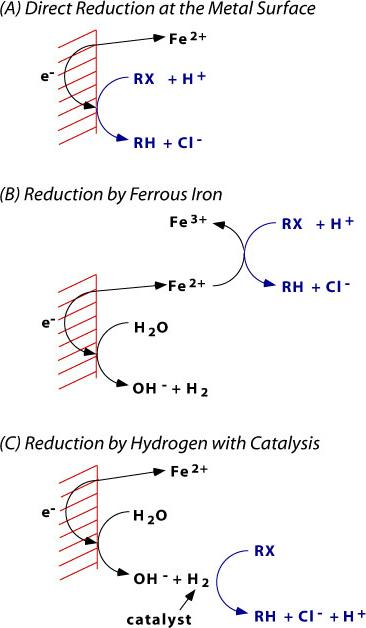
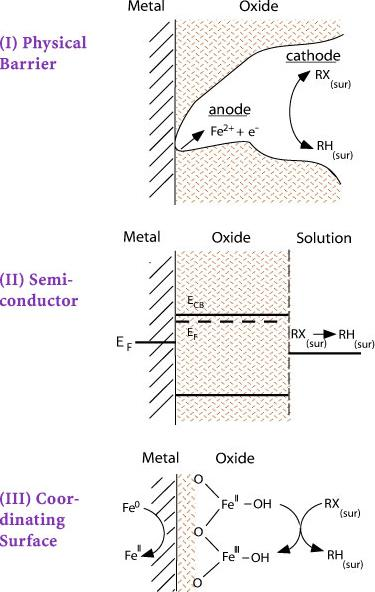
Surface catalyzed reactions

The reactions that occur with permeable reactive barriers and ferrous iron are surface based. The surface reactions take three different forms: direct reduction, electron shunting through ferrous iron, and reduction by production and reaction of hydrogen. Pathway A represents direct electron transfer (ET) for Fe^{0} to the adsorbed halocarbon (RX) at the metal/water point of contact, resulting in dechlorination and production of Fe^{2+}. Pathway B shows that Fe^{2+} (resulting from corrosion of Fe^{0}) may also dechlorinate RX, producing Fe^{3+}. Pathway C shows that H_{2} from the anaerobic corrosion of Fe^{2+} might react with RX if a catalyst is present.

=== Enhancement of reductive pathways ===
The reductive processes discussed above can be enhanced in two ways. One is by increasing the amount of usable iron in the subsurface to increase the rate of the reduction by chemical or biological means. The second method is to enhance the reducing ability of the iron by coupling it with other chemical reductants or using biological reduction with it. Using this processes, scientists combined sodium dithionite with iron to treat Chrominum VI and TCE effectively.

Combining bacterial action and biological processes with iron is also known to be effective. The most evident uses of biological processes are with the EZVI technology created by NASA and with the EHC product created by Adventus. Both of these materials have iron within some biological matrix (iron is suspended in vegetable oil in EZVI and in organic carbon in EHC) and use microbial organisms to enhance the reduction zone and to create a more anaerobic environment for the reactions to take place in.

== Implementation ==
A common implementation of ISCR is the installation of permeable reactive barriers (PRBs), but there are instances when the reductant can be directly injected into the subsurface to treat source areas. These barriers are usually made out of zero-valent iron (ZVI) but can also be made with other zero-valent metals. Commonly a trench with ZVI, nanoscale iron, or palladium. Nanoscale iron particles can also be injected directly into the subsurface to treat plumes, and they have large surface areas and, therefore, high reactivities and can be distributed more evenly in the contamination site. Palladium's reaction rates are rapid. The main advantages of PRBs are that it can reduce a variety of contaminants and it has no above-ground structure. Problems with PRBs include that even with well constructed barriers, there might be the problem of hydraulic short-circuiting.
