= Chemical oxidation =

Chemical oxidation may refer to:

- Redox reactions, which involving oxidation and reduction of chemicals
- In situ oxidation, an environmental remediation technique
