= Zerovalent iron =

Metallic iron

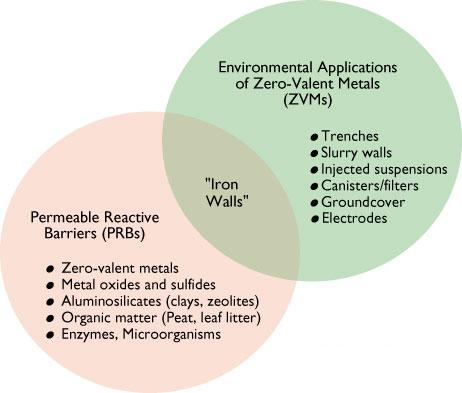
Venn diagram showing the overlap between ZVIs and PRBs

Zerovalent iron (ZVI) describes forms of iron metal that are proposed for use in the environmental remediation of contaminated soil and groundwater.

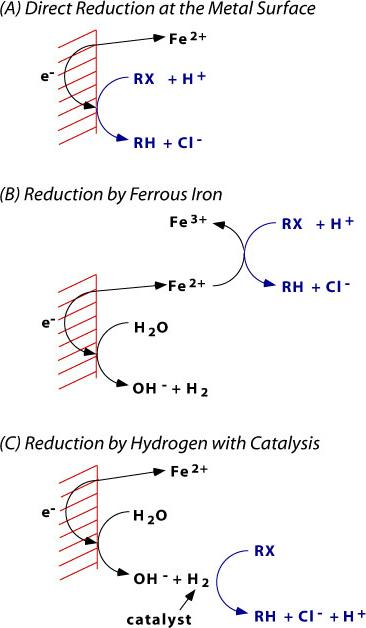
Model A

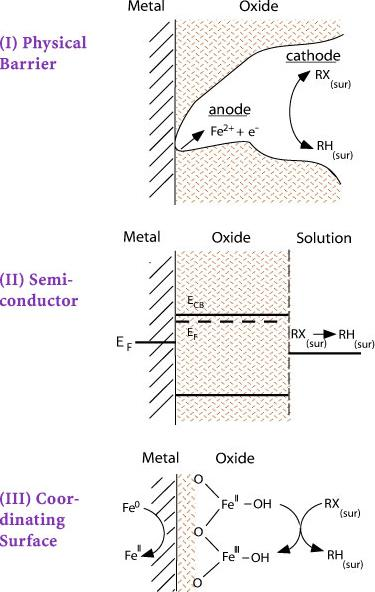
Model B

Click either image to enlarge

ZVI operates by electron transfer from Fe^{0} toward some organochlorine compounds, a common class of pollutants. The remediation process is proposed to generate Fe^{2+} and Cl^{−} and halide-free organic products, all of which are relatively innocuous. Nanoscale ZVIs (nZVIs) are commonly used in remediation of chlorinated compounds and other pollutants.

== Type of ZVI ==
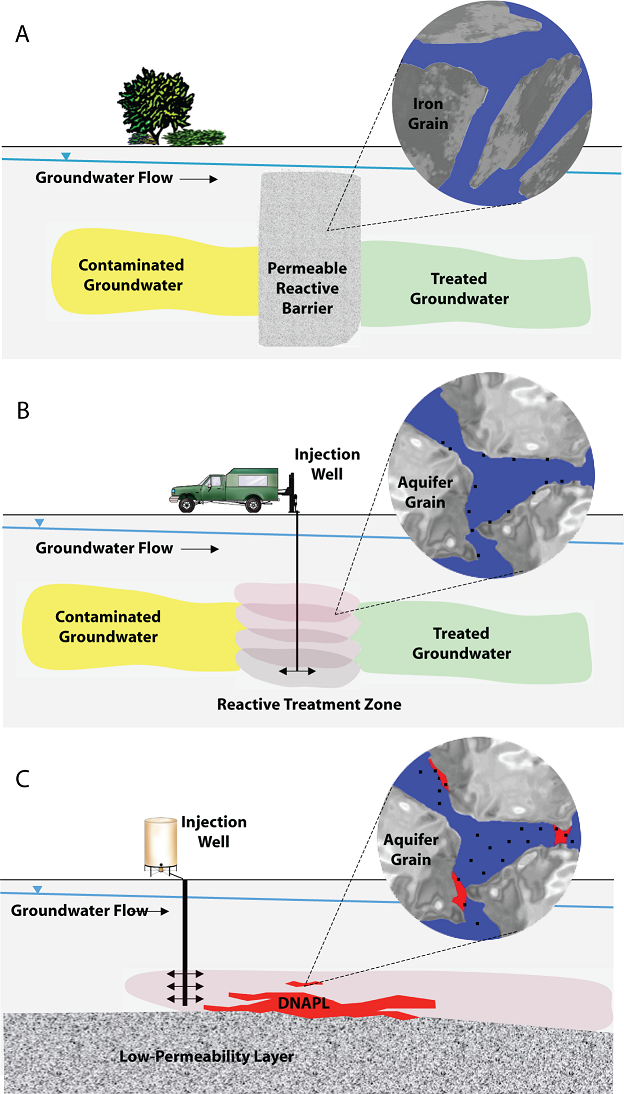
click to enlarge

- Bulk Fe. Cast iron, consisting of scrap iron of construction grade, has been used as a reactive material for permeable reactive barriers (PRB) for groundwater remediation. Reactions are generally believed to occur on the Fe (oxide) surface; however, graphite inclusions can also serve as reaction sites.
- Nanoscale Fe. In addition to using macroscale iron in PRBs, nanoparticles (1-100 nm diameter) of zerovalent iron (nZVI) are effective.
- Zn. Zinc has shown much higher reactivity toward pentachlorophenol than iron. This indicates that zinc may be used as a replacement for ZVI in dechlorinating chlorinated phenols. Chlorinated phenols are sequentially dechlorinated and thus less-chlorinated phenols have been identified as a reduction product.

== Type of contaminants treated ==
Treatment of many kinds of pollutants has been proposed, but few have been demonstrated in solving environmental challenges.

- Cadmium (Cd^{2+}) is converted to immobile Cd metal.
- Chloramines are effectively reduced by ZVI.
- Nitrate reduction by iron powder is observed at pH ≤ 4. Ammonia is the end product. Using nanoscale iron, Nitrogen gas (N_{2}) is the product.
- Nitrated aromatics are reduced by bulk iron.
- Chlorinated pesticides such as DDT, DDD, and DDE. The rates of dechlorination are enhanced by the surfactant Triton X-114.
- Perchloroethylene (PCE) and trichloroethylene (TCE), common industrial solvents, and their degradation products dichloroethylene (DCE) and vinyl chloride, can be reduced to ethylene and ethane using ZVI as a reagent. This can be applied to the remediation of soils contaminated with these chlorinated organic solvents, commonly found at dry cleaning facilities.
