= Mega Borg oil spill =

Man-made disaster

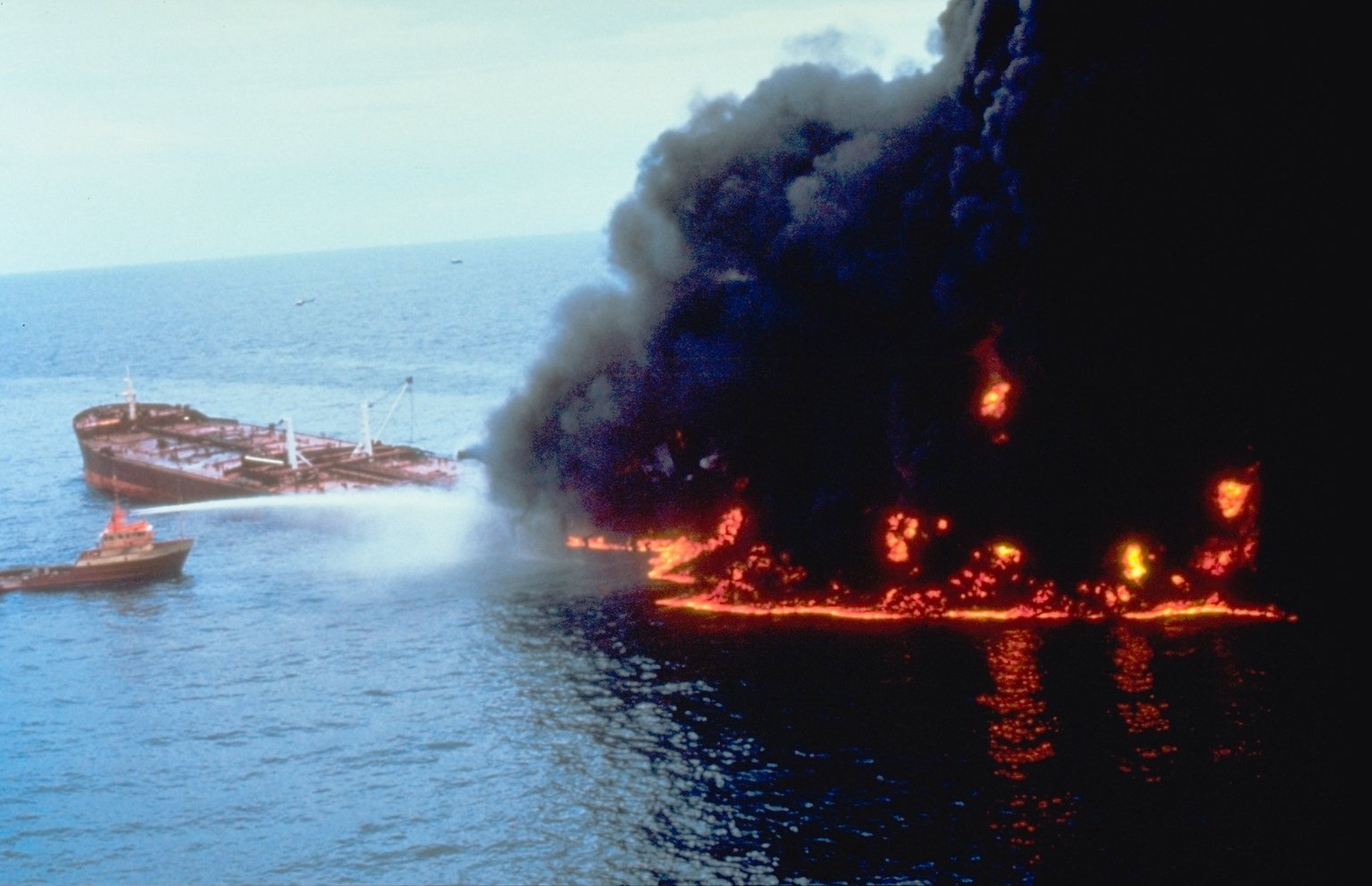
Mega Borg aflame

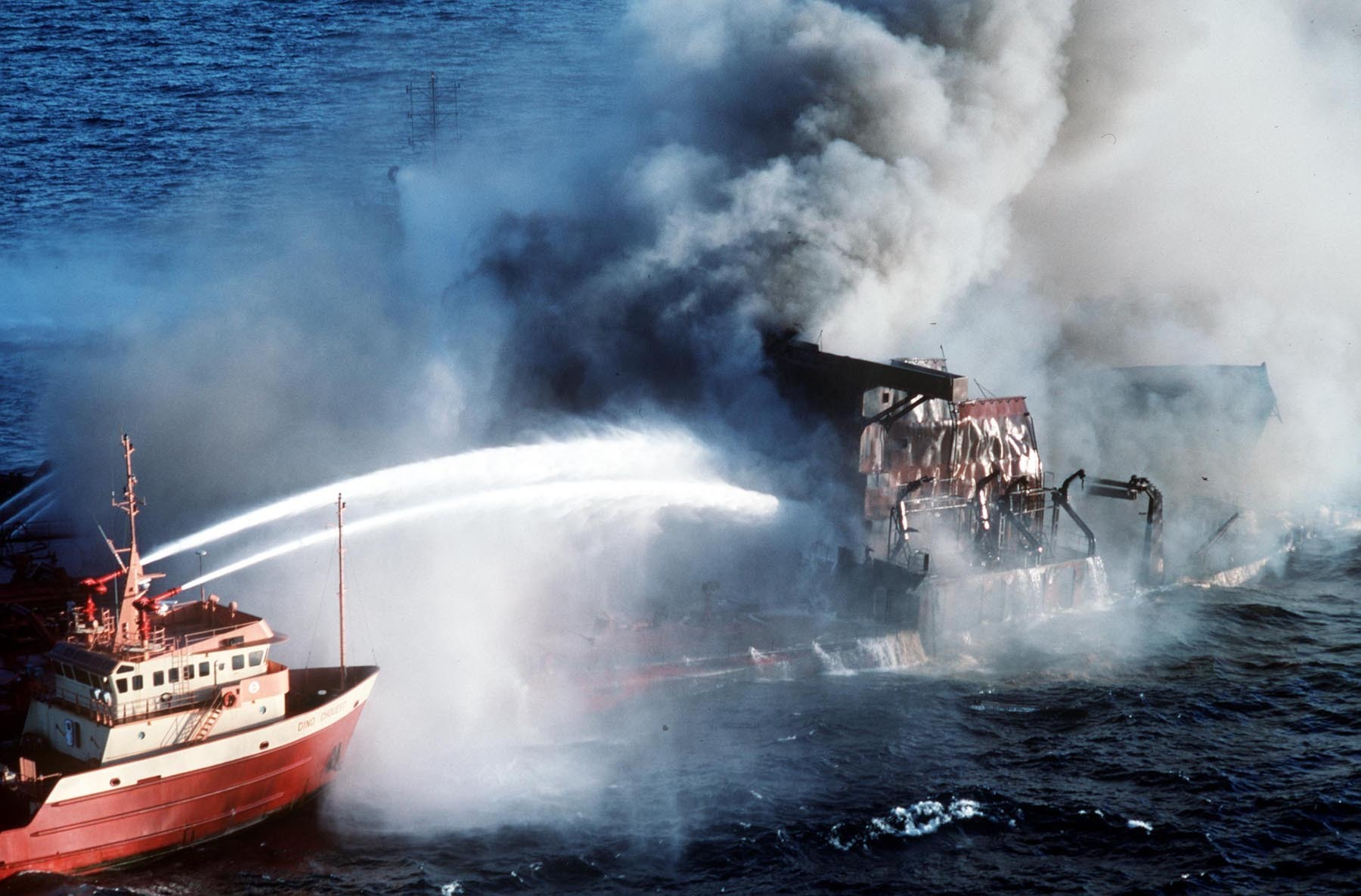
Boats work to contain the fire

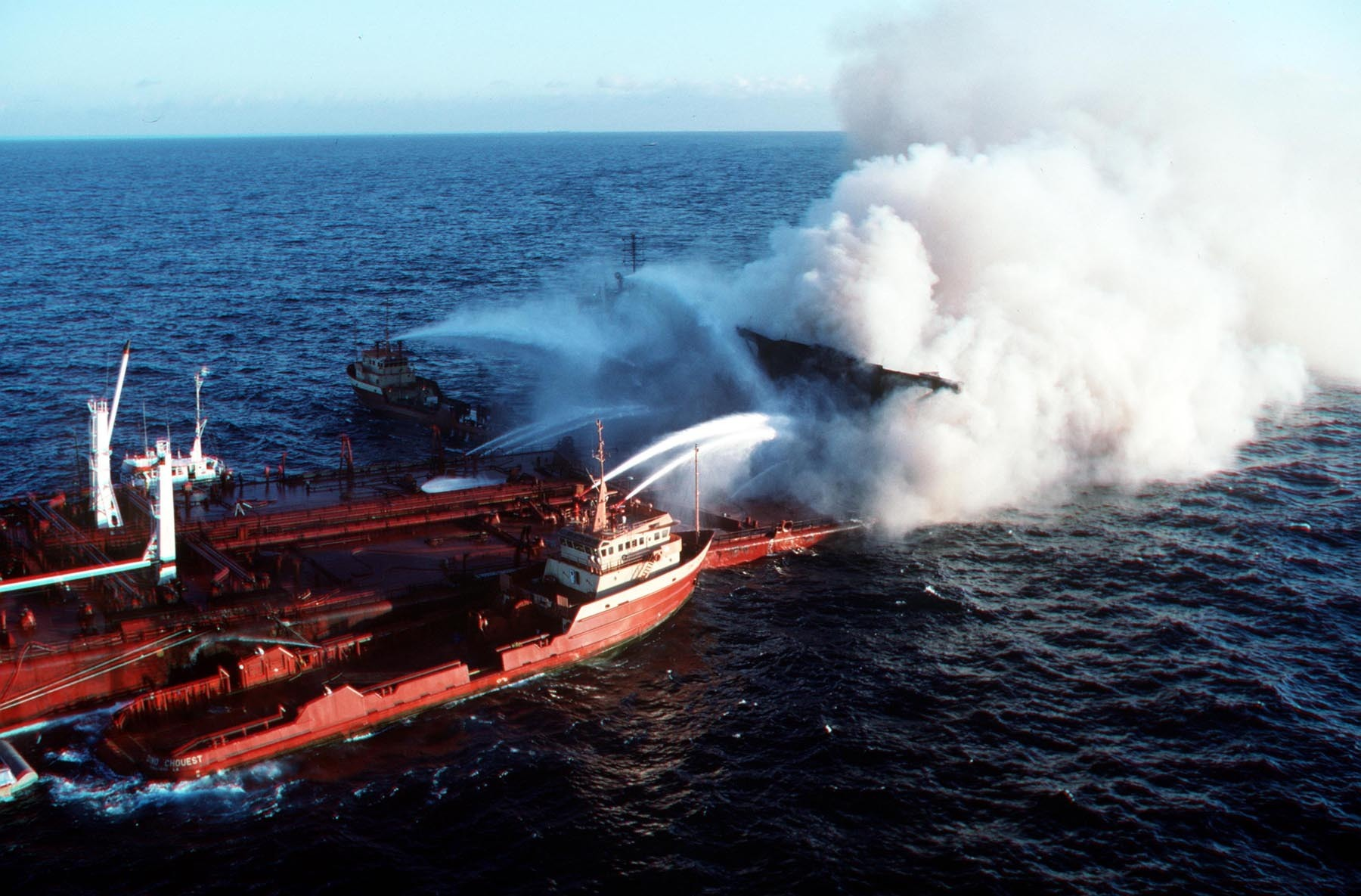

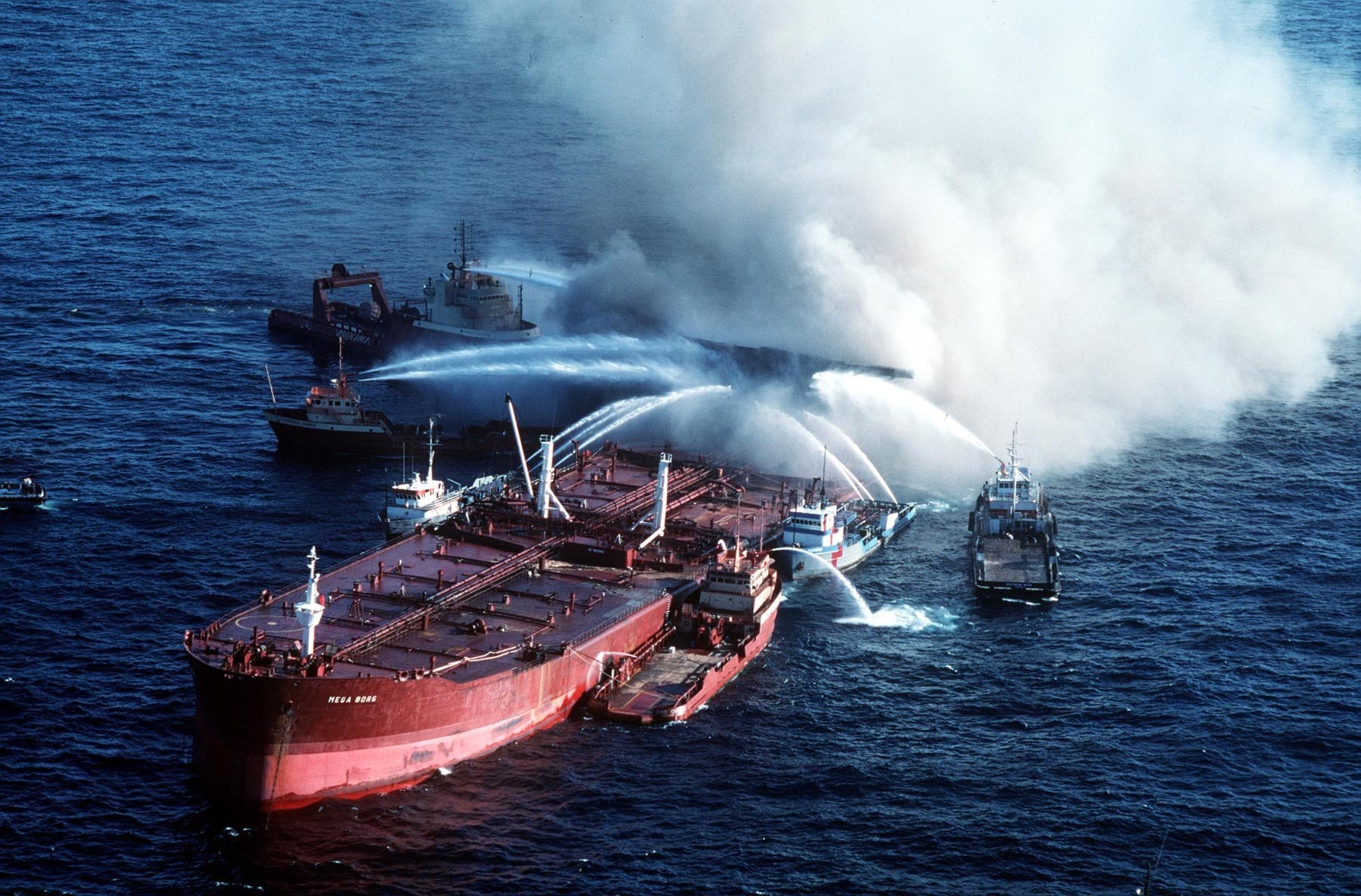

The Mega Borg oil spill occurred in the Gulf of Mexico on June 8, 1990, roughly 50 miles off the coast of Texas, when the oil tanker Mega Borg caught on fire and exploded. The cleanup was one of the first practical uses of bioremediation.

== Initial explosion and cause ==
At 11:30 PM on the evening of Friday June 8, 1990, an explosion in the cargo room of the Norwegian oil tanker the Mega Borg “ruptured the bulkhead between the pump room and the engine room”, causing the ship to catch fire and begin to leak oil. The 853-foot-long, 15-year-old vessel was about 50 miles off the coast of Galveston, Texas when the explosion occurred. The weather at the time was calm and the tanker had easily passed Coast Guard safety inspections in April earlier that year. While the direct cause of the engine room explosion remains unknown, the initial blast occurred during a lightering process in which the Mega Borg was transferring oil onto a smaller Italian tanker, the Fraqmura, in order to then transport the oil to Houston. This transfer was necessary, as the Mega Borg was too large to dock at the Texas port. Three million gallons of the total 38 million gallons of light Angolan Palanca crude oil on board the tanker were able to be transferred to the Fraqmura before the blast. Two days after the initial blast, there were five successive explosions in a ten-minute window. These explosions greatly increased the rate of the spill from the tanker into the water. By the end of that day (June 11) the tanker stern had dropped 58 feet and had stabilized five feet above the water line. This was either due to shifting cargo or the tanker taking on water, which would be an indication of the vessel’s imminent sinking.

The light crude oil spilled in the Mega Borg incident was brown and evaporated much quicker than the heavy crude oil in spills such as the Exxon Valdez. This means that the oil is less likely to heavily coat nearby beaches, flora and fauna, however the tanker was carrying more oil than the Exxon Valdez incident spilled in total, so there was a lot of concern about the oil not being able to evaporate if the slick became too thick.

The fire caused by the initial explosion took eight days to burn out, making it hard for firefighters to board the tanker and stop the leakage of oil. However, the fire was helpful in the fact that it functioned as a natural in situ burning – out of the over 4.6 million spilled gallons, only 12,000 to 40,000 were left after the fire had burned out both on the water and on the tanker.

== Cleanup and containment ==
Two days after the spill, on Monday June 11, eight ships with skimmers, booms, and fire equipment encircled the Mega Borg, with 12 more ships on the way. The Elf Acquitane Petroleum Company of Houston (owners of part of the Mega Borg’s cargo) used planes to spread dispersants within five miles of the site of the tanker’s explosion. By June 13, the previously 30 mile by 10 mile oil sheen had diminished to 13 miles long by 5 miles wide.

After an eight-day-long fire, from June 8 to June 16, the Coast Guard was able to contain and put out the flames. This then allowed for workers to stabilize the engine room and begin pumping out and unloading any remaining oil. Once the fire was stopped, “high seas barrier booms were brought in to contain the rest of the leaked oil During the eight days the fire lasted, firefighters were continuously cooling the ship with both water and, once the fire had sufficiently died down, with foam cannons. One, however experimental, part of the cleanup process was the release of about 100 pounds of bacteria over an acre of the slick. Known as bioremediation, this process has been used in labs, but never before on the open ocean. The microbes work by breaking down oil by “eating” it and turning the “hydrocarbons into more benign byproducts.” The only drawback to this method was that, at the time, scientists were unsure about whether or not the bacteria cause more toxins to be released into the water. A “slick-sucking vessel” was sent by the Coast Guard and was waiting on standby in case the Mega Borg sank and released its entire load of oil into the ocean.

== Controversy ==
The nearest fire control equipment of the type necessary for a fire of this size and type was in Louisiana, so it had to be shipped in and was not available as quickly as some people believe it should have been. Additional equipment was shipped in from the Netherlands, adding to the belief that it could have been found closer to the spill site and thus the oil could have been contained earlier. Local officials in Galveston argued that the decision to use foreign equipment delayed cleanup by two days, but Tony Redding, a spokesman for the Dutch company that lead the salvage (Smit Tak B.V.), said that all of the necessary materials were assembled “less than a day after the initial explosion” and that "Absolutely no delay was encountered as a result of the airlifting of equipment from Europe.”

Some local officials also asked why foam was not used until five days after the explosion. Redding answered this by explaining that “A foam attack without extensive cooling has no chance of killing a fire of this type.”

== Social and environmental effects ==
The explosion’s initial damage was inflicted on the 41 crew members aboard – two of them died, two disappeared and are presumed dead, and 17 were injured.

The Gulf of Mexico is one of the United States’ richest fishing grounds, and the Mega Borg spill added to an abundance of oil spills that have happened in the area. The Deep Water Horizon oil spill in 2010 additionally had massive effects on the Gulf Coast in 2010. These affect not only marine microorganisms in deep waters, but larger deep-water fish and thus both recreational and commercial fishermen. This can lead to potential closures of Gulf area fisheries as well. Furthermore, the oil from the spill can possibly reach the local fish and contaminate the fisherman's ability to sell them as it poses risks for consumer safety. Workers involved in such spills and their cleanup typically have higher risks of health issues due to exposure to crude oil and other chemicals. Some health issues may include PTSD, respiratory issues, nonfatal myocardial infarction, headaches, and nausea shortly after exposure. Additionally, the National Wildlife Refuges near Galveston’s shores, nearby salt marches, and oyster reefs were all in potential danger depending on the extent of the slick’s spread. Oil spills damage ocean life by disordering the food chains and potentially destroying certain plants and animals. Such oil spills not only disrupt underwater wildlife but also damage local infrastructure and residential homes. Those who have lower socioeconomic status are at higher risk of damage and living in affected oil spill areas, such as by the coast.

On June 29, 1990, it was reported that tar balls from the Mega Borg spill were appearing as far away as Louisiana beaches.

== Legal impact ==
The Mega Borg spill brought attention to the 984 protocols of legislation that have been held up in Senate since 1985. The Protocols passed the House, but have not been ratified due to arguments over international liabilities and whether or not the US should join international funding groups for oil spills. If ratified, the protocols would do a number of things including create multiple new federal response teams and a new fleet of special containment booms and skimmers. Government agencies have discussed with communities regarding emergency relief as well as data for chemical threat levels. Some communities have implemented Passive Sampling Devices (PSD’s) in order to sample various chemicals for their potential hazard levels. Also, government agencies have paired with affected communities in order to survey and test exposure threats in order to increase emergency preparedness and boost recovery resilience.
