= LNAPL transmissivity =

LNAPL transmissivity is the discharge of light non-aqueous phase liquid (LNAPL) through a unit width of aquifer for a unit gradient.

Scholars Alex Mayer and S. Majid Hassanizadeh define LNAPL transmissivity as the "product of the porous medium permeability and the LNAPL relative permeability, which in turn is a function of saturation, and the thickness of the LNAPL". They wrote that once LNAPL is taken away, a lower recovery rate occurs because the "saturation and thickness of the mobile LNAPL fraction decreases".

LNAPL transmissivity is a summary parameter that takes into account soil type and physical properties (e.g., porosity and permeability), LNAPL physical fluid properties (e.g., density and viscosity) and LNAPL saturation (i.e., amount of LNAPL present within the pore network). Consequently, LNAPL transmissivity is comparable across soil types, LNAPL types and recoverable LNAPL volumes. For LNAPL recovery from a given well, the soil and LNAPL physical properties do not change significantly through time. What changes, is the LNAPL saturation (amount of LNAPL present). As a result, LNAPL transmissivity decreases in direct proportion to the decrease in LNAPL saturation achievable through liquid recovery technology.

LNAPL transmissivity is not the only piece of data required when evaluating a site overall, because it requires a good LNAPL conceptual model in order to calculate. However, it is a superior summary metric to gauged LNAPL thickness to represent LNAPL recoverability and migration risk (e.g., on site maps) and direct remediation efforts.
