= Landfarming =

Landfarming is an ex situ waste treatment process that is performed in the upper soil zone or in biotreatment cells. Contaminated soils, sediments, or sludges are transported to the landfarming site, mixed into the soil surface and periodically turned over (tilled) to aerate the mixture. Landfarming commonly uses a clay or composite liner to intercept leaching contaminants and prevent groundwater pollution, however, a liner is not a universal requirement.

== Applicability ==
This technique has been used for years in the management and disposal of drill cuttings, oily sludge and other petroleum refinery wastes. The equipment employed in land farming is typical of that used in agricultural operations. These land farming activities cultivate and enhance microbial degradation of hazardous compounds. As a rule of thumb, the higher the molecular weight (i.e., the more rings within a polycyclic aromatic hydrocarbon), the slower the degradation rate. Also, the more chlorinated or nitrated the compound, the more difficult it is to degrade.

== Limitations ==
Factors that may limit the applicability and effectiveness of the process include:

1. large space requirements
2. the conditions advantageous for biological degradation of contaminants are largely uncontrolled, which increases the required length of time until complete degradation, particularly for recalcitrant compounds
3. inorganic contaminants are not biodegraded
4. the potential of large amounts of particulate matter released by operations
5. the presence of metal ions may be toxic to microbes and may leach from the contaminated soil into the ground.
6. high levels of hydrocarbon contamination (>7%) are toxic to the microbes and will not degrade
7. the microbes convert hydrocarbons to greenhouse gases

Hydrocarbon compounds that have been identified as being not readily degraded by land farming include creosote, pentachlorophenol (PCP), and bunker C oil.
