= Groundwater remediation =

Process used to treat polluted groundwater

Groundwater remediation is the process that is used to treat polluted groundwater by removing the pollutants or converting them into harmless products. Groundwater is water present below the ground surface that saturates the pore space in the subsurface. Globally, between 25 percent and 40 percent of the world's drinking water is drawn from boreholes and dug wells. Groundwater is also used by farmers to irrigate crops and by industries to produce everyday goods. Most groundwater is clean, but groundwater can become polluted, or contaminated as a result of human activities or as a result of natural conditions.

The many and diverse activities of humans produce innumerable waste materials and by-products. Historically, the disposal of such waste have not been subject to many regulatory controls. Consequently, waste materials have often been disposed of or stored on land surfaces where they percolate into the underlying groundwater. As a result, the contaminated groundwater is unsuitable for use.

Current practices can still impact groundwater, such as the over application of fertilizer or pesticides, spills from industrial operations, infiltration from urban runoff, and leaking from landfills. Using contaminated groundwater causes hazards to public health through poisoning or the spread of disease, and the practice of groundwater remediation has been developed to address these issues. Contaminants found in groundwater cover a broad range of physical, inorganic chemical, organic chemical, bacteriological, and radioactive parameters. Pollutants and contaminants can be removed from groundwater by applying various techniques, thereby bringing the water to a standard that is commensurate with various intended uses.

== Techniques ==
Ground water remediation techniques span biological, chemical, and physical treatment technologies. Most ground water treatment techniques utilize a combination of technologies. Some of the biological treatment techniques include bioaugmentation, bioventing, biosparging, bioslurping, and phytoremediation. Some chemical treatment techniques include ozone and oxygen gas injection, chemical precipitation, membrane separation, ion exchange, carbon absorption, aqueous chemical oxidation, and surfactant enhanced recovery. Some chemical techniques may be implemented using nanomaterials. Physical treatment techniques include, but are not limited to, pump and treat, air sparging, and dual phase extraction.

=== Biological treatment technologies ===
==== Bioaugmentation ====
If a treatability study shows no degradation (or an extended lab period before significant degradation is achieved) in contamination contained in the groundwater, then inoculation with strains known to be capable of degrading the contaminants may be helpful. This process increases the reactive enzyme concentration within the bioremediation system and subsequently may increase contaminant degradation rates over the nonaugmented rates, at least initially after inoculation.

==== Bioventing ====
Bioventing is an on site remediation technology that uses microorganisms to biodegrade organic constituents in the groundwater system. Bioventing enhances the activity of indigenous bacteria and archaea and stimulates the natural in situ biodegradation of hydrocarbons by inducing air or oxygen flow into the unsaturated zone and, if necessary, by adding nutrients. During bioventing, oxygen may be supplied through direct air injection into residual contamination in soil. Bioventing primarily assists in the degradation of adsorbed fuel residuals, but also assists in the degradation of volatile organic compounds (VOCs) as vapors move slowly through biologically active soil.

==== Biosparging ====
Biosparging is an in situ remediation technology that uses indigenous microorganisms to biodegrade organic constituents in the saturated zone. In biosparging, air (or oxygen) and nutrients (if needed) are injected into the saturated zone to increase the biological activity of the indigenous microorganisms. Biosparging can be used to reduce concentrations of petroleum constituents that are dissolved in groundwater, adsorbed to soil below the water table, and within the capillary fringe.

==== Bioslurping ====
Bioslurping combines elements of bioventing and vacuum-enhanced pumping of free-product that is lighter than water (light non-aqueous phase liquid or LNAPL) to recover free-product from the groundwater and soil, and to bioremediate soils. The bioslurper system uses a “slurp” tube that extends into the free-product layer. Much like a straw in a glass draws liquid, the pump draws liquid (including free-product) and soil gas up the tube in the same process stream. Pumping lifts LNAPLs, such as oil, off the top of the water table and from the capillary fringe (i.e., an area just above the saturated zone, where water is held in place by capillary forces). The LNAPL is brought to the surface, where it is separated from water and air. The biological processes in the term “bioslurping” refer to aerobic biological degradation of the hydrocarbons when air is introduced into the unsaturated zone contaminated soil.

==== Phytoremediation ====
In the phytoremediation process certain plants and trees are planted, whose roots absorb contaminants from ground water over time. This process can be carried out in areas where the roots can tap the ground water. Few examples of plants that are used in this process include Chinese Ladder fern Pteris vittata, also known as the brake fern, is a highly efficient accumulator of arsenic. Genetically altered cottonwood trees are good absorbers of mercury and transgenic Indian mustard plants soak up selenium well.

==== Permeable reactive barriers ====
Certain types of permeable reactive barriers utilize biological organisms in order to remediate groundwater.

=== Chemical treatment technologies ===
==== Chemical precipitation ====
Chemical precipitation is commonly used in wastewater treatment to remove hardness and heavy metals. In general, the process involves addition of agent to an aqueous waste stream in a stirred reaction vessel, either batchwise or with steady flow. Most metals can be converted to insoluble compounds by chemical reactions between the agent and the dissolved metal ions. The insoluble compounds (precipitates) are removed by settling and/or filtering.

==== Ion exchange ====
Ion exchange for ground water remediation is virtually always carried out by passing the water downward under pressure through a fixed bed of granular medium (either cation exchange media and anion exchange media) or spherical beads. Cations are displaced by certain cations from the solutions and ions are displaced by certain anions from the solution. Ion exchange media most often used for remediation are zeolites (both natural and synthetic) and synthetic resins.

==== Carbon adsorption ====
The most common activated carbon used for remediation is derived from bituminous coal. Activated carbon adsorbs volatile organic compounds from ground water; the compounds attach to the graphite-like surface of the activated carbon.

==== Chemical oxidation ====
In this process, called In Situ Chemical Oxidation or ISCO, chemical oxidants are delivered in the subsurface to destroy (converted to water and carbon dioxide or to nontoxic substances) the organics molecules. The oxidants are introduced as either liquids or gasses. Oxidants include air or oxygen, ozone, and certain liquid chemicals such as hydrogen peroxide, permanganate and persulfate. Ozone and oxygen gas can be generated on site from air and electricity and directly injected into soil and groundwater contamination. The process has the potential to oxidize and/or enhance naturally occurring aerobic degradation. Chemical oxidation has proven to be an effective technique for dense non-aqueous phase liquid or DNAPL when it is present.

==== Surfactant enhanced recovery ====
Surfactant enhanced recovery increases the mobility and solubility of the contaminants absorbed to the saturated soil matrix or present as dense non-aqueous phase liquid. Surfactant-enhanced recovery injects surfactants (surface-active agents that are primary ingredient in soap and detergent) into contaminated groundwater. A typical system uses an extraction pump to remove groundwater downstream from the injection point. The extracted groundwater is treated aboveground to separate the injected surfactants from the contaminants and groundwater. Once the surfactants have separated from the groundwater they are re-used. The surfactants used are non-toxic, food-grade, and biodegradable. Surfactant enhanced recovery is used most often when the groundwater is contaminated by dense non-aqueous phase liquids (DNAPLs). These dense compounds, such as trichloroethylene (TCE), sink in groundwater because they have a higher density than water. They then act as a continuous source for contaminant plumes that can stretch for miles within an aquifer. These compounds may biodegrade very slowly. They are commonly found in the vicinity of the original spill or leak where capillary forces have trapped them.

==== Permeable reactive barriers ====
Some permeable reactive barriers utilize chemical processes to achieve groundwater remediation.

=== Physical treatment technologies ===
==== Pump and treat ====
Pump and treat is one of the most widely used ground water remediation technologies. In this process ground water is pumped to the surface and is coupled with either biological or chemical treatments to remove the impurities.

==== Air sparging ====
Air sparging is the process of blowing air directly into the ground water. As the bubbles rise, the contaminants are removed from the groundwater by physical contact with the air (i.e., stripping) and are carried up into the unsaturated zone (i.e., soil). As the contaminants move into the soil, a soil vapor extraction system is usually used to remove vapors.

==== Dual phase vacuum extraction ====
Dual-phase vacuum extraction (DPVE), also known as multi-phase extraction, is a technology that uses a high-vacuum system to remove both contaminated groundwater and soil vapor. In DPVE systems, a high-vacuum extraction well is installed with its screened section in the zone of contaminated soils and groundwater. Fluid/vapor extraction systems depress the water table and water flows faster to the extraction well. DPVE removes contaminants from above and below the water table. As the water table around the well is lowered from pumping, unsaturated soil is exposed. This area, called the capillary fringe, is often highly contaminated, as it holds undissolved chemicals, chemicals that are lighter than water, and vapors that have escaped from the dissolved groundwater below. Contaminants in the newly exposed zone can be removed by vapor extraction. Once above ground, the extracted vapors and liquid-phase organics and groundwater are separated and treated. Use of dual-phase vacuum extraction with these technologies can shorten the cleanup time at a site, because the capillary fringe is often the most contaminated area.

==== Monitoring-well oil skimming ====
Monitoring-wells are often drilled for the purpose of collecting ground water samples for analysis. These wells, which are usually six inches or less in diameter, can also be used to remove hydrocarbons from the contaminant plume within a groundwater aquifer by using a belt-style oil skimmer. Belt oil skimmers, which are simple in design, are commonly used to remove oil and other floating hydrocarbon contaminants from industrial water systems.

A monitoring-well oil skimmer remediates various oils, ranging from light fuel oils such as petrol, light diesel or kerosene to heavy products such as No. 6 oil, creosote and coal tar. It consists of a continuously moving belt that runs on a pulley system driven by an electric motor. The belt material has a strong affinity for hydrocarbon liquids and for shedding water. The belt, which can have a vertical drop of 100+ feet, is lowered into the monitoring well past the LNAPL/water interface. As the belt moves through this interface, it picks up liquid hydrocarbon contaminant which is removed and collected at ground level as the belt passes through a wiper mechanism. To the extent that DNAPL hydrocarbons settle at the bottom of a monitoring well, and the lower pulley of the belt skimmer reaches them, these contaminants can also be removed by a monitoring-well oil skimmer.

Typically, belt skimmers remove very little water with the contaminant, so simple weir-type separators can be used to collect any remaining hydrocarbon liquid, which often makes the water suitable for its return to the aquifer. Because the small electric motor uses little electricity, it can be powered from solar panels or a wind turbine, making the system self-sufficient and eliminating the cost of running electricity to a remote location.

== See also ==
- Toxic torts
- Brownfield
- CERCLA
- Groundwater pollution
- Plume (hydrodynamics)
- Groundwater remediation applications of nanotechnology
