= Light non-aqueous phase liquid =

Groundwater contaminant

A light non-aqueous phase liquid (LNAPL) is a groundwater contaminant, specifically they are "hydrocarbons that exist as a separate, immiscible phase when in contact with water and/or air." It is not soluble in water and has a lower density than water, in contrast to a DNAPL which has a higher density than water. Once a LNAPL pollution infiltrates the ground, it will stop at the depth of the water table because of its positive buoyancy. Efforts to locate and remove LNAPLs are relatively less expensive and easier than for DNAPLs because LNAPLs float on top of the water table.

Examples of LNAPLs are benzene, toluene, xylene, and other hydrocarbons.

== See also ==
- DNAPL
- LNAPL transmissivity
