= 1,2-DCE =

1,2-DCE may refer to:

- 1,2-Dichloroethane (EDC)
- 1,2-Dichloroethene
