= In situ chemical oxidation =

Advanced oxidation process

In situ chemical oxidation (ISCO) is an environmental remediation technique proposed for soil and/or groundwater remediation to lower the concentrations of targeted environmental contaminants to acceptable levels. ISCO would be accomplished by introducing strong chemical oxidizers into the contaminated medium (soil or groundwater) to destroy chemical contaminants in place. It can be used to remediate a variety of organic compounds, including some that are resistant to natural degradation. The in situ in ISCO is just Latin for "in place", signifying that ISCO is a chemical oxidation reaction that occurs at the site of the contamination.

The remediation of certain organic substances such as chlorinated solvents (trichloroethene and tetrachloroethene), and gasoline-related compounds (benzene, toluene, ethylbenzene, MTBE, and xylenes) by ISCO is effective. Some other contaminants can be made less toxic through chemical oxidation.

A wide range of ground water contaminants respond well to ISCO, so it is a popular method to use.

== History ==
Fenton's reagent (hydrogen peroxide catalyzed with iron) and potassium permanganate are the oxidants that have been used the longest and remain used widely. Hydrogen peroxide was first used in 1985 to treat a formaldehyde spill at Monsanto's Indian Orchard Plant in Springfield, Massachusetts. At this site, a 10% solution of hydrogen peroxide was injected into a formaldehyde plume. Fenton's reagent was initially used to treat hydrocarbon sites where benzene, toluene, and ethylbenzene were present.

Hydrogen peroxide is effective for chlorinated solvents as is permanganate, which also became an established remedial agent.

Sodium persulfate was introduced for ISCO in the late 1990s because of the limitations in using peroxide or permanganate as oxidants. The specificity of permanganate (chlorinated solvents require double bonds) and consumption by non-target organic material in soil are examples of these limitations. Persulfate is more stable, treats a wider range of contaminants, and is not consumed by soil organics as easily.

== Agents of Oxidization ==
Common oxidants used in this process are permanganate (both sodium permanganate and potassium permanganate), Fenton's Reagent, persulfate, and ozone. Other oxidants can be used, but these four are the most commonly used.

=== Permanganate ===
Permanganate is used in groundwater remediation in the form of potassium permanganate (KMnO_{4}) and sodium permanganate (NaMnO_{4}). Both compounds have the same oxidizing capabilities and limitations and react similarly to contaminants. The biggest difference between the two chemicals is that potassium permanganate is less soluble than sodium permanganate.

Potassium permanganate is a crystalline solid that is typically dissolved in water before application to the contaminated site. Unfortunately, the solubility of potassium permanganate is dependent on temperature. Because the temperature in the aquifer is usually less than the temperature in the area that the solution is mixed, the potassium permanganate becomes a solid material again. This solid material then does not react with the contaminants. Over time, the permanganate will become soluble again, but the process takes a long time. This compound has been shown to oxidize many different contaminants but is notable for oxidizing chlorinated solvents such as perchloroethylene (PCE), trichloroethylene (TCE), and vinyl chloride (VC). However, potassium permanganate is unable to efficiently oxidize diesel, gasoline, or BTEX.

Sodium permanganate is more expensive than potassium permanganate, but because sodium permanganate is more soluble than potassium permanganate, it can be applied to the site of contamination at a much higher concentration. This shortens the time required for the contaminant to be oxidized. Sodium permanganate is also useful in that it can be used in places where the potassium ion cannot be used. Another advantage that sodium permanganate has over potassium permanganate is that sodium permanganate, due to its high solubility, can be transported above ground as a liquid, decreasing the risk of exposure to granules or skin contact with the substance.

The primary redox reactions for permanganate are given by the equations:

1. MnO^{−}_{4} + 8H^{+} + 5e^{−} → Mn^{2+} + 4H_{2}O — (for pH < 3.5)
2. MnO^{−}_{4} + 2H_{2}O + 3e^{−} → MnO_{2}(S) + 4OH^{−} — (for pH 3.5 to 12)
3. MnO^{−}_{4} + e^{−} → MnO^{2−}_{4} — (for pH > 12)

The typical reaction that occurs under common environmental conditions is equation 2. This reaction forms a solid product, MnO_{2}.

The advantage of using permanganate in ISCO is that it reacts comparatively slowly in the subsurface which allows the compound to move further into the contaminated space and oxidize more contaminants. Permanganate can also help with the cleanup of materials that are not very permeable. In addition, because both sodium permanganate and potassium permanganate solutions have a density greater than water's density, permanganate can travel through the contaminated area through density-driven diffusion.

The use of permanganate creates the byproduct MnO_{2}, which is naturally present in the soil and is therefore a safe byproduct. Unfortunately, several studies have shown that this byproduct seems to cement sand particles together forming rock-like material that has very low permeability. As the rock-like materials build up, it blocks the permanganate from getting to the rest of the contaminant and lowers the efficiency of the permanganate. This can be prevented by extracting the MnO_{2} from the contaminated area.

=== Fenton's Reagent ===
Fenton's reagent is basically a mixture of ferrous iron salts as a catalyst and hydrogen peroxide. A similar sort of reaction can be made by mixing hydrogen peroxide with [ferric] iron (Iron III). When the peroxide is catalyzed by soluble iron it forms hydroxyl radicals(·OH) that oxidize contaminants such as chlorinated solvents, fuel oils, and BTEX. Traditional Fenton's reagent usually requires a significant pH reduction of the soils and groundwater in the treatment zone to allow for the introduction and distribution of aqueous iron as iron will oxidize and precipitate at a pH greater than 3.5. Unfortunately, the contaminated groundwater that needs to be treated has a pH level that is at or near neutral. Due to this, there are controversies on whether ISCO using Fenton's reagent is really a Fenton reaction. Instead, scientists call these reactions Fenton-like. However, some ISCO vendors successfully apply pH neutral Fenton's reagent by chelating the iron which keeps the iron in solution and mitigates the need for acidifying the treatment zone. The Fenton chemistry is complex and has many steps, including the following:

1. Fe^{2+} + H_{2}O_{2} → Fe^{3+} + OH· + OH^{−}
2. Fe^{3+} + H_{2}O_{2} → Fe^{2+} + OOH· + H^{+}
3. HO· + H_{2}O_{2} → Fe(III) + HO^{·}_{2} + H^{+}
4. HO· + Fe(II) → Fe(III) + OH^{−}
5. Fe(III) + HO^{·}_{2} → Fe(II) + O_{2}H^{+}
6. Fe(II) + HO^{·}_{2} + H^{+} → Fe(III) + H_{2}O_{2}
7. HO^{·}_{2} + HO^{·}_{2} → H_{2}O_{2} + O_{2}

These reactions do not occur step by step but simultaneously.

When applied to In Situ Chemical Oxidation, the collective reaction results in the degradation of contaminants in the presence of Fe^{2+} as a catalyst. The overall end result of the process can be described by the following reaction:

H_{2}O_{2} + contaminant → H_{2}O + CO_{2} + O_{2}

Advantages of this method include that the hydroxyl radicals are very strong oxidants and react very rapidly with contaminants and impurities in the ground water. Moreover, the chemicals needed for this process are inexpensive and abundant.

Traditional Fenton's reagent applications can be very exothermic when significant iron, manganese or contaminant (i.e. NAPL concentrations) are present in an injection zone. Over the course of the reaction, the groundwater heats up and, in some cases, reagent and vapors can surface out of the soil. Stabilizing the peroxide can significantly increase the residence time and distribution of the reagent while reducing the potential for excessive temperatures by effectively isolating the peroxide from naturally occurring divalent transition metals in the treatment zone. However, NAPL contaminant concentrations can still result in rapid oxidation reactions with an associated temperature increase and more potential for surfacing even with reagent stabilization. The hydroxyl radicals can be scavenged by carbonate, bicarbonate, and naturally occurring organic matter in addition to the targeted contaminant, so it important to evaluate a site's soil matrix and apply additional reagent when these soil components are present in significant abundance.

=== Persulfate ===
Persulfate is a newer oxidant used in ISCO technology. The persulfate compound that is used in groundwater remediation is in the form of peroxodisulfate or peroxydisulfate (S_{2}O^{2−}_{8}) but is generally called a persulfate ion by scientists in the field of environmental engineering. More specifically, sodium persulfate is used because it has the highest water solubility and its reaction with contaminants leaves least harmful side products. Although sodium persulfate by itself can degrade many environmental contaminants, the sulfate radical SO^{−}_{4} is usually derived from the persulfate because sulfate radicals can degrade a wider range of contaminants at a faster pace(about 1,000–100,000 times) than the persulfate ion. Various agents, such as heat, ultraviolet light, high pH, hydrogen peroxide, and transition metals, are used to activate persulfate ions and generate sulfate radicals.

The sulfate radical is an electrophile, a compound that is attracted to electrons and that reacts by accepting an electron pair in order to bond to a nucleophile. Therefore the performance of sulfate radicals is enhanced in an area where there are many electron donating organic compounds. The sulfate radical reacts with the organic compounds to form an organic radical cation. Examples of electron donating groups present in organic compounds are the amino (-NH2), hydroxyl (-OH), and alkoxy (-OR) groups. Conversely, the sulfate radical does not react as much in compounds that contain electron attracting groups like nitro (-NO_{2}) and carbonyl (C=O) and also in the presence of substances containing chlorine atoms. Also, as the number of ether bonds increases, the reaction rates decrease.

When applied in the field, persulfate must first be activated (it must be turned into the sulfate radical) to be effective in the decontamination. The catalyst that is most commonly used is ferrous iron (Iron II). When ferrous iron and persulfate ions are mixed together, they produce ferric iron (iron III) and two types of sulfate radicals, one with a charge of −1 and the other with a charge of −2. New research has shown that Zero Valent Iron (ZVI) can also be used with persulfate with success. The persulfate and the iron are not mixed beforehand, but are injected into the area of contamination together. The persulfate and iron react underground to produce the sulfate radicals. The rate of contaminant destruction increases as the temperature of the surroundings increases.

The advantage of using persulfate is that persulfate is much more stable than either hydrogen peroxide or ozone above the surface and it does not react quickly by nature. This means fewer transportation limitations, it can be injected into the site of contamination at high concentrations, and can be transported through porous media by density driven diffusion. The disadvantage is that this is an emerging field of technology and there are only a few reports of testing it in the field and more research needs to be done with it. Additionally, each mole of persulfate creates one mole of oxidizer (sulfate radical or hydroxyl radical). These radicals have low atomic weights while the persulfate molecule has a high atomic weight (238). Therefore, the value (oxidizer produced when persulfate is activated) for expense (price of relatively heavy persulfate molecule) is low compared to some other oxidizing reagents.

=== Ozone ===
While oxygen is a very strong oxidant, its elemental form O_{2} is not very soluble in water. This poses a problem in ground water remediation, because the chemical must be able to mix with water to remove the contaminant. Fortunately, ozone (O_{3}) is about 12 times more soluble than O_{2} and, although it is still comparably insoluble, it is a strong oxidant.

The unique part of ozone oxidation is its in-situ application. Because, unlike other oxidants used in ISCO, it is a gas, it needs to be injected into the contamination site from the bottom rather than the top. Tubes are built into the ground to transport the ozone to its starting place; the bubbles then rise to the surface. Whatever volatile substances are left over are sucked up by a vacuum pump. Because the bubbles travel more vertically than horizontally, close placement of ozone injection wells is needed for uniform distribution.

The biggest advantage in using ozone in ISCO is that ozone does not leave any residual chemical like persulfate leaves SO^{2−}_{4} or permanganate leaves MnO_{2}. The processes involved with ozonation (treating water with ozone) only leave behind O_{2}. Ozone can also react with many of the important environmental contaminants. In addition, because ozone is a gas, adding ozone to the bottom of the contaminant pool forces the ozone to rise up through the contaminants and react. Because of this property, ozone can also be delivered more quickly. Also, in theory, H_{2}O_{2} co-injected with ozone will result in -OH ions, which are very strong oxidants.

However, ozone has many properties that pose problems. Ozone reacts with a variety of contaminants, but the problem is that it also reacts quickly with many other substances such as minerals, organic matter, etc. that are not the targeted substances. Again, it is not very soluble and stays in gas form in the water, which makes ozone prone to nonuniform distribution and rising up to the top of contamination site by the shortest routes rather than traveling through the entire material. In addition, ozone must be generated, and that requires a huge amount of energy.

== Implementation ==
The primary delivery mechanism for ISCO is through perforated, hollow metal rods hammered into the ground by "direct-push" drilling methods or by injecting the oxidant into wells installed using hollow stem auger, rotary drilling methods. One advantage of injection wells is that they can be used for multiple applications of the oxidant material, while direct push injection techniques are generally quicker and less expensive. Injection wells for ozone are typically constructed of a 1–2" stainless-steel screen set in sand pack, grouted to the surface using a combination of cement and bentonite clay. Often, a field pilot study must be performed to determine injection parameters and well spacing.

Oxidants such as permanganate and Fenton's Reagent are delivered as water-based solutions. These substances are injected into the aquifer and then allowed to propagate by gravity and water current. As contaminants are encountered, the substances oxidize them and purify the water. Ozone is delivered (sparged) as a gas in either a dry air or oxygen carrier gas. Specialized equipment is required for in-situ oxidation via ozone gas injection. The ozone has to be pumped into the groundwater from the bottom of the aquifer because the ozone gas is less dense than the water. As the ozone travels through the aquifer against gravity, it reacts with contaminants along the way. However, there are some specific methods of oxidant delivery including injection probes, hydraulic fracturing, soil mixing, vertical wells, horizontal wells, and treatment walls.

=== Injection probes ===
Injection probes are used in areas where there is very low permeability. A small diameter probe (2 to 4 cm in diameter) is rotated or pushed into the ground while reagents are inserted into it at low pressure. The reagents travel down the core of the probe and exit out through small perforations along the sides of the probe which are located at certain intervals. The reagents travel away from the core by going into existing cracks and pores and create a "halo of reactivity" (from pg. 182 or Principles and Practices of In Situ Chemical Oxidation Using Permanganate). In order to optimize the amount of contaminant that is oxidized, the probes are set into the ground relatively close together, about .6-1.2 meters apart.

=== Hydraulic fracturing ===
Hydraulic fracturing is the process of artificially creating fractures in a site that has low permeability and then filling the fractures with oxidants. First, a hole is drilled into the ground, and then a forceful jet of water is used to create fractures. Coarse sand, which allows just enough permeability for oxidants to get through, is used to fill the fractures and prevent them from closing up, and after that, the oxidant is injected into the fracture.

=== Soil mixing ===
Soil mixing can be used to deliver solid or liquid forms of oxidants to contaminated soil. For near surface to intermediate contamination zones, either standard construction equipment (i.e. bucket mixing), or specialized soil mixing tools (i.e. Lang Tool, Allu Tool, Alpine, etc.) can be used. Deep soil mixing requires specialized auger mixing equipment. In order to apply this method in-situ and in deep soil, the oxidant must be pumped to the point of mixing using a kelly bar (a piece of earth drilling equipment), or appropriate piping to the place where the soil needs to be oxidized. The soil then has to be mixed by using mixing blades.

=== Horizontal and vertical wells ===
Horizontal well networks are basically the use of long pipes that lead in and out of the contaminated aquifer or plume used to inject oxidants and extract the treated ground water. Vertical wells networks consist of appropriately spaced injection wells with slightly overlapping radius of influence (ROI) to ensure reagent contact within the vertical and horizontal treatment zone. Injection wells can be permanently installed or be temporarily installed (i.e. by using direct push technology). Horizontal well networks use pipes that are slightly L-shaped at the bottom to inject oxidant and extract treated groundwater horizontally. Horizontal wells are used especially when oxidants need to be delivered to thin layers of saturation.

=== Treatment walls ===
Treatment walls are used to deliver oxidants to the end of a contaminant plume and can be used to prevent the migration of an oxidant. The walls usually consist of continuous trenches that are connected to a piping network into which oxidants can be injected into. Another version of this delivery system is the use of a disconnected series of vertical wells to inject the oxidant into the ground water. The factors that affect treatment wall application and performance are similar to the factors that effect the performance of permeable reactive barriers.

== Case studies ==
The ISCO technology has been tested many times in the field. The following are a few examples of studies that have been conducted to observe the effectiveness of ISCO.

=== Naval Air Station North Island ===
In January 2007, the groundwater around the Naval Air Station North Island in San Diego County, California was treated. This test treated a total of 60,000 gallons of groundwater and used about 22,646 pounds of sodium persulfate to do it. No catalysts were added to the persulfate, but there was a significant amount of contaminant reduction. The production of radical was concluded to be due to the elevated temperature of the groundwater (20 °C-24 °C). At the end of 19 days after the last injection of sodium persulfate, there was an overall TCE concentration reduction of greater than 90%.

=== Space Launch Complex 37 ===
Space Launch Complex 37 supported the Saturn spacecraft launches from 1961–1971. Activities in the Complex included parts cleaning and engine flushing, which left two chlorinated volatile organic compound (CVOCs) source areas. The United Launch Alliance also used the area for launching the Delta IV launch vehicles prior to any remediation activities on the site. Maximum concentrations of CVOCs in the site were 9500 micro grams/Liter of cis 1,2-DCE and 7900 micro grams/Liter of vinyl chloride. Both sites were cleaned up with the use of ozone. An ozone injection grid was used that consisted of 116 stainless steel wells. After 16 months of ozone treatment, there was a contaminant mass reduction of 44% in one site and 70% in the other site.

=== Nebraska Ordnance Plant ===
The Nebraska Ordnance Plant, located near Mead, Nebraska was a military facility that produced bombs, rockets, and shells from 1942-1956. For their production, highly explosive materials like 2,4,6-trinitrotoluene (TNT) and hexahydro-1,3,5-trinitro-1,3,5-triazine (RDX) were used; to reduce the plant's workers' chemical exposure to these materials, RDX and TNT residues that collected on the floor were washed away with water routinely. The water flowed outside into unlined ditches contaminated the soil around the plant with RDX and TNT. Trichloroethylene (TCE) to degrease pipelines further contaminated the area. Over the years the contaminants entered the groundwater.

In order to stop the spread of the contaminated groundwater, an elaborate system of 11 extraction wells has been placed to contain the plumes. This method treats the water with granular activated carbon. This field was chosen to test how effectively permanganate could remove explosive contaminants. On the field, two injection wells were placed to create a curtain of permanganate between them, through which the contaminant plume would flow. The results of the oxidation was a temporary contaminant decrease in the wells by 70–80%, but permanganate was not evenly distributed through the curtain. The test showed that permanganate was an effective tool to temporarily remove explosive contaminants from groundwater.

== Performance application ==
The effectiveness of the oxidation is contingent on the site lithology, the residence time of the oxidant, the amount of oxidant used, the presence of oxidizing materials other than the targeted contaminant, the degree of effective contact between the oxidant and the contaminant(s), and the kinetics of the oxidation reaction between the oxidant and contaminant.

The soil and groundwater are tested both before and after oxidant application to verify the effectiveness of the process. Monitoring of gases given off during oxidation can also help determine if contaminants are being destroyed. Elevated levels of CO_{2} is an indicator of oxidation.

== Safety and hazards ==
The four main types of oxidants that are used in ISCO—Fenton's reagent, ozone, permanganate, and persulfate—are all strong oxidizing agents and pose serious hazards to the people who are working with them. For worker safety, site that are using ozone as the oxidant must test ozone levels in the air periodically because ozone has adverse respiratory effects. All oxidants must be stored properly so that they do not decompose and workers must ensure that they do not have skin contact with any of the oxidants.

Some ISCO compounds can react aggressively with organic contaminants and must be used with care on the site. Fenton's reagent in particular is highly exothermic and can cause unwanted effects on microbial life in the aquifer if it is not used carefully or stabilized.

Further challenges associated with ISCO include the generation of unwanted or toxic oxidation products. Recent evidence suggests that the oxidation of benzene results in the formation of phenol (a relatively benign compound) and a novel aldehyde side-product, the toxicology of which is unknown.

== Potential improvements ==
Currently ISCO is mostly applied by itself, but it may be possible to combine ISCO with other technologies such as in situ chemical reduction (ISCR) and in situ thermal desorption (ISTD). As ISCO is not efficient at treating low concentration contaminant plumes, ISCO can be used to treat the contaminant source while ISCR treats the plumes.

Traditional ISCO is limited by mass transfer of contaminants into the aqueous (groundwater) phase. Since the oxidation reaction takes place in the groundwater, contaminant destruction is restricted to only those contaminants which have partitioned into the groundwater phase. To overcome this limitation at sites which have substantial soil contamination, and/or non-aqueous phase liquid (NAPL), surfactants can be injected simultaneously with oxidants. The surfactants emulsify soil sorbed contaminants and/or NAPL enabling them to be destroyed in aqueous phase oxidative reactions; this patented technology is known as Surfactant-enhanced In Situ Chemical Oxidation (S-ISCO).

The ISCO delivery technology and reagents also could be enhanced. Currently, an oxidant is injected into the contaminated site and is distributed by the injection pressure, turbulence and advection. This method is effective with appropriate point spacing and slightly overlapping radius of influence (ROI). However, peroxide-based reagents are not very stable and react with other substances soon after being injected into the sub-surface unless the peroxide is stabilized. Additionally, current persulfate activation methods often stall resulting in sub-optimal results. These problems could be fixed by creating oxidants that are more stable and specifically targeted to contaminants so that they do not oxidize other substances. The delivery systems could also be improved so that the oxidants are sent to the correct locations.

== See also ==
- In-situ capping of subaqueous waste
- In situ chemical reduction
