= Dense non-aqueous phase liquid =

Insoluble contaminant liquid denser than water and sinking in aquifers

A dense non-aqueous phase liquid or DNAPL is a denser-than-water NAPL, i.e. a liquid that is both denser than water and is immiscible in or does not dissolve in water.

The term DNAPL is used primarily by environmental engineers and hydrogeologists to describe contaminants in groundwater, surface water and sediments. DNAPLs tends to sink below the water table when spilled in significant quantities and only stop when they reach impermeable layers such as clay layers or low porosity bedrock. Their penetration into an aquifer makes them difficult to locate and remediate.

== Examples ==
Examples of materials that are DNAPLs when spilled include:

- chlorinated solvents, such as trichloroethylene, tetrachloroethylene, 1,1,1-trichloroethane and carbon tetrachloride
- coal tar
- creosote
- polychlorinated biphenyl (PCBs)
- mercury
- gallium and its alloys
- extra heavy crude oil, with an API gravity of less than 10
- certain per- and polyfluoroalkyl substances (PFAS)
- pesticides

When spilled into the environment, chlorinated solvents are frequently present as DNAPL and the DNAPL can provide a long-term secondary source of the chlorinated solvent to dissolved groundwater plumes. Chlorinated solvents are typically immiscible in water, having low solubility in water by definition, yet still have a solubility above the concentrations allowed by drinking water protections. Therefore, DNAPL which is a chlorinated solvent can act as an ongoing pathway for constituents to dissolve into groundwater. Common use of chlorinated solvents in manufacturing operations began during World War II, with the rate of usage for most solvents increasing into the 1970s. By the early 1980s, chemical analyses became available that documented widespread contamination of groundwater with chlorinated solvents. Since that time, a considerable effort has been extended to improve our ability to locate and remediate DNAPL present as chlorinated solvents.

Most DNAPLs remain denser than water after they are released into the environment (e.g. spilled trichloroethene does not become lighter than water, it will remain denser than water). However, when the DNAPL is a complex mixture of chemicals, the density of the mixture can change over time as the mixture interacts with the natural environment. As an example, a mixture of trichloroethene and cutting oil may be released and originally be denser than water—a DNAPL. As the mixture of trichloroethene and oil is leached by groundwater, the trichloroethene may preferentially leach out of the oil and the mixture may become less dense than water and become buoyant (e.g. the liquid may become an LNAPL). Similarly, changes can be seen at some coal gasification plants or manufactured gas plants where the tar mixtures can be denser than water, be neutrally buoyant or be less dense than water and the densities can change with time.

== Remediation ==
DNAPLs that are not viscous, such as chlorinated solvents, tend to sink into aquifer materials below the water table and become much more difficult to locate and remediate than non-aqueous phase liquids that are lighter than water (LNAPLs) which tend to float at the water table when spilled into natural soils. The United States Environmental Protection Agency (USEPA) has focused considerable attention on the remediation of DNAPL which can be costly. Removal or in situ destruction of DNAPLs eliminates the potential exposure to the compounds in the environment and can be an effective method for remediation; however, at some DNAPL sites remediation of DNAPL may not be practicable, and containment may be the only viable remedial action. The USEPA has a program to address sites where DNAPL removal is not practicable for remediation projects under CERCLA under the Resource Conservation and Recovery Act Dense nonaqueous phase liquids (DNAPLs) have low solubility and are with viscosity markedly lower and density higher than water-asphalt, heavy oils, lubricants and also chlorinated solvents-penetrate the full depth of the aquifer and accumulate on its bottom. "DNAPL movement follows the slope of the impermeable strata underlying the aquifer and can move in the opposite direction to the groundwater gradient."

Groundwater remediation technologies have been developed that can address DNAPL in some settings. Excavation is not always practicable due to the depths of the DNAPL, the dispersed nature of the residual DNAPL, mobility caused during excavation, and complexities with near-by structures. Technologies for treatment include:

- in situ chemical oxidation (ISCO)
  - potassium permanganate
  - hydrogen peroxide (with or without an iron catalyst)
  - ozone sparging
  - persulfate
- in situ enhanced reductive dechlorination
- in situ surfactant flushing
- air sparging
- heating

== See also ==
- NAPL
- LNAPLs (light non-aqueous phase liquids) – water immiscible liquids that are lighter than water.
