= Dichloroethene =

Dichloroethene or dichloroethylene, often abbreviated as DCE, can refer to any one of several isomeric forms of the organochloride with the molecular formula C_{2}H_{2}Cl_{2}:

There are three isomers:

- 1,1-Dichloroethylene
- 1,2-Dichloroethylene (E and Z)

== See also ==
- Dichloroethane
