= Permeable reactive barrier =

Groundwater cleaning technique

A permeable reactive barrier (PRB), also referred to as a permeable reactive treatment zone (PRTZ), is a developing technology that has been recognized as being a cost-effective technology for in situ (at the site) groundwater remediation. PRBs are barriers which allow some—but not all—materials to pass through. One definition for PRBs is an in situ treatment zone that passively captures a plume of contaminants and removes or breaks down the contaminants, releasing uncontaminated water. The primary removal methods include: (1) sorption and precipitation, (2) chemical reaction, and (3) reactions involving biological mechanisms.

== Reactive processes ==
There are a variety of ways that permeable reactive membranes can be used in order to remediate groundwater. The two main processes are immobilization (AKA sequestration) and transformation.

=== Immobilization ===
Immobilization of the contaminant may occur through sorption to the barrier materials or precipitation from the dissolved state. Organic compounds tend to be undergo sorption due to hydrophobic expulsion from the surrounding water. Metals, however, tend to sorb through electrostatic attraction or surface complexation reactions. Sorption and precipitation are potentially reversible and may thus require removal of the reactive medium and gathered products in order to continue with remediation.

=== Transformation ===
Transformation involves taking the contaminant and transforming it to a less harmful or non-toxic form. One of the chief benefits of transformation is that it does not necessarily require removal of the reactive medium (unless the reactive medium must be replaced due to decreased effectiveness or clogging occurs). Transformation most commonly takes the form of an irreversible redox reaction. The medium may directly supply electrons for reduction or stimulate microorganisms to facilitate electron transfer.

== Reactive Materials ==
In addition, there are several different materials which may be used. Here are the more prominent:

=== Zerovalent iron ===
Zerovalent Iron was the first material to be used in PRBs for groundwater remediation. It continues to be the main material used in the construction of these barriers. In addition to conventional scale iron, nanoscale-iron may also be used.

=== Biological barriers ===
Sometimes material will be put into the ground to stimulate the growth of microbes that facilitate the groundwater remediation. Many environmental pollutants are highly reduced, thus, the oxidation of these pollutants to harmless compounds is thermodynamically viable. Other pollutants, such as chlorinated solvents, are highly oxidized and as such are easily reduced. Microorganisms commonly facilitate such redox reactions, exploiting contaminant degradation as a means to obtain energy and materials for cell synthesis.

Oxidative biodegradation necessitates electron acceptors that microbes use to "respire" the electrons removed from target contaminants. This transfer of electrons releases energy to drive microbial life functions. Under aerobic conditions, molecular oxygen is used for this purpose. When oxygen is not present, a variety of other molecules can serve as electron acceptors. Oxygen is preferentially utilized over the anaerobic electron acceptors because using oxygen gives more energy and, as an added benefit, results in faster contaminants oxidation rates. Unfortunately, the available oxygen is often not sufficient for the contaminants in highly contaminated areas, and as a result the anaerobic electron acceptors must be utilized. Reactive barriers containing oxygen-releasing compounds have been used successfully to stimulate aerobic biodegradation of monoaromatic hydrocarbons.

=== Surfactant-modified zeolites ===
Clays, zeolites, and other natural material have a high capacity for cation exchange. They do this by creating a net negative charge by substituting lower-valent cations (e.g. Al^{3+}) with a higher-valent cation (e.g. Si^{4+}) within the mineral structure. Adding sorbed surfactants can change the affinity for anions and nonpolar organic compounds. Surfactants that have accumulated at the surface will create a hydrophobic organic coating that promotes sorption of non-polar organic compounds. Surfactant Modified Zeolites (SMZs) are promising for treating non-polar organic contaminants. However, clay's low permeability means it cannot be used in flow-through PRBs, but have been proposed for use in slurry walls, landfill liners, and containment barriers. Zeolites; however, have cavities to maintain hydraulic conductivity, allowing their use in PRBs.

=== Peat moss ===
Peat moss has a large specific surface area (>200 m^{2}/g) and a high porosity. Metals are taken up by peat through an ion exchange reaction where the metal displaces a proton if the pH is low or an existing metal if the pH is high from the anionic function group. Anions, such as CrO^{2−}_{4} and MnO^{2−}_{4} are removed more effectively at pH < 3 because of the positively charged surface created by the addition of protons onto the surface functional groups, whereas cations, such as UO^{2+}_{2}, Ni^{2+}, Cu^{2+}, are more effectively removed at higher pH values. Peat moss seems to be an effective ion-exchange material for removing heavy metals and some anions. Removal efficiency of cations approaches 100% at low pH, but the strong dependency on pH and the initial metal ion concentration have to be considered.

== Groundwater modeling ==
Modeling groundwater flow is important for optimizing the design of a PRB. Most importantly, by modeling the flow, the hydraulic capture zone width (HCZW) and the residence time can be determined. The HCZW is the width of the zone of groundwater that will pass through the reactive cell or gate (for funnel-and-gate configurations). The residence time is the time that the contaminated groundwater will spend in the treatment zone for decontamination. Contamination outside the capture zone or that does not have a long enough residence time will not be properly decontaminated. Groundwater modeling can also be used for the following:

1. Determining the location of the PRB
2. Determining a suitable configuration
3. Determining the width of the reactive cell (and funnel for funnel-and gate)
4. Evaluating potential for underflow, overflow, or flow across aquifers
5. Providing knowledge of groundwater flow fluctuations (velocity and direction) for use in the design
6. Determining reactive media selection (based on hydraulic conductivity) to match the conductivity of the aquifer
7. Evaluating possibilities for flow bypass due to reduced porosity
8. Helping determine monitoring well locations and monitoring frequencies

== Configuration ==
=== Iron barriers ===
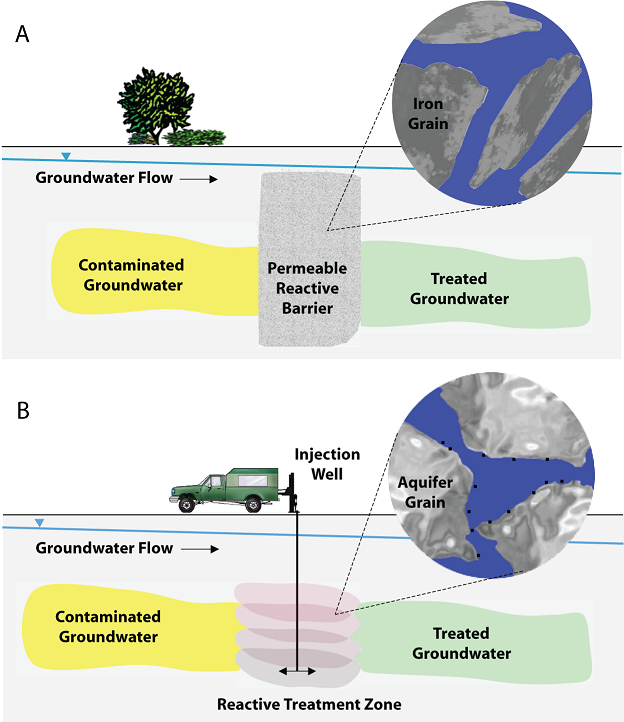
click to enlarge

The accompanying figure shows two approaches to application of iron particles for groundwater remediation: Fig. A, a conventional PRB made with mm-sized granular iron and Fig. B, a "reactive treatment zone" formed by sequential injection of nano-sized iron to form overlapping zones of particles absorbed by the grains of native aquifer material. In A, groundwater flows through the barrier and is remediated. In B, nanoparticles of iron are represented by black dots; the nanoparticles have little mobility in the porous medium. Note that reaction will only occur when contaminants, either dissolved in the groundwater or as DNAPL, come into contact with the iron surfaces.

=== Funnel and gate ===
Funnel and gate systems are used to channel the contaminant plume into a gate which contains the reactive material. The funnels are non-permeable, and the simplest design consists of a single gate with walls extending from both sides. The main advantage of the funnel and gate system is that a smaller reactive region can be used for treating the plume, resulting in a lower cost. In addition, if the reactive media needs to be replaced, it is much easier to do so because of the small gate.

== Implementation ==
PRBs are typically installed by digging a long trench in the path of the flow of the contaminated groundwater. The trench is then filled with the reactive materials (typically iron, carbon, or limestone). Sand can be mixed with the reactive material to aid in allowing the water to flow through the materials. Sometimes, there will be a wall that directs the groundwater to the reactive parts of the barrier. After the trench has been filled with reactive material, soil will typically be used to cover the PRB, thus eliminating visibility from the surface.

=== Sheet pile and excavation ===
Sheet pile and excavation were used for the installation of earlier PRBs. This method involves containing the area of excavation using sheet piles before excavating using a trackhoe. This method may be slow (and therefore expensive) and is only viable for plumes less than 35 feet deep.

=== Continuous trencher ===
Continuous trenching involves using a large cutting chain excavator system then using the trench box and hopper to continuously back-fill the trench with reactive media. Continuous trenching can be fast and thus, inexpensive, but can only be used for trenches less than 50 feet deep. In addition, the machinery used for this technique cannot be used effectively for soil with large cobbles.

=== Mendrel emplacement ===
Mendrel technology involves vertically driving a long hollow beam deep into the ground. The beam is covered as it is driven in, and the cover is removed once the beam has been placed. Next, the hollow is filled with iron filings. The Mendrel is then vibrated as it is removed, allowing the iron to flow to the bottom, forming the PRB. The Mendrel is then moved one width over, the process is repeated, and a continuous PRB is made.

=== Hydraulic fracture ===
This methods utilizes injected fine-grained iron into fractures below the surface that were created using controlled applications of high pressure. Jets of water scour out a zone that is then filled with guar gum and iron. The guar gum holds the iron in place before degrading, leaving a permeable zone of iron (the PRB).

=== Deep soil mixing ===
Deep soil mixing adds iron to the native soil and mixing it with large augers. This process creates a series of columnar treatment zones that form a PRB when lined up. This method can treat plumes to a depth of 100 feet, but the treatment zone is relatively low in the proportion of iron.

== Performance assessment ==
The key component for assessing the success of a PRB is whether it satisfactorily removes the contaminants. This can be done by monitoring the levels in the water immediately downstream of the PRB. If the levels are below maximum contaminant levels, then the PRB has performed its function.

=== Failure ===
In analyzing PRBs, emphasis has been placed on losses of reactivity and permeability in the reactive well; however, flawed hydraulic characterization of the few PRB failures that have been reported. Oxidation-reduction potential, influent [pH], and influent concentrations of [alkalinity], [nitrate NO^{−}_{3}], and [chloride Cl^{−}] are the strongest predictors of possible diminished performance of PRBs. The reactivity of the media, rather than a reduction in permeability is more likely the factor that limits field PRB longevity. Because this technology is relatively new, it is still hard to predict the longevity of sites. Depending on assumptions of controlling factors, longevity estimates can differ by an order of magnitude (e.g. 10–100 years).

== Case studies ==
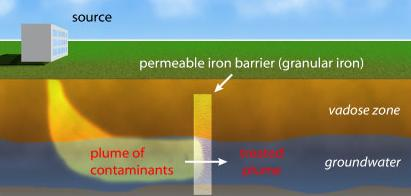
an example of an "iron wall"

A field-scale application of PRBs in groundwater remediation consisted of a treatment zone formed by excavating an area isolated by sheet piles, refilling the hole with a mixture of granular iron and sand, and removing the sheet pile to leave an in situ, permeable, iron-bearing treatment zone. The contaminants, chlorinated ethylenes (PCE and TCE), were removed, leaving, for the most part, fully dechlorinated groundwater (little vinyl chloride was observed).

=== Sunnyvale, CA ===
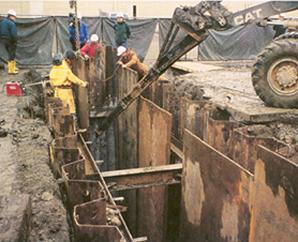
During the installation of a PRB at Sunnyvale, CA, click to enlarge

The first field-scale implementation of PRB was in Sunnyvale, California, at the site of a previously operating semi-conductor plant. At the time, the best available remediation technology was pump and treat technology. PRBs presented a more cost-effective solution to the problem at hand, being able to passively remediate the groundwater. Granular metal was chosen as the reactive media after laboratory testing using contaminated water from the site. After installation contaminants were reduced to target levels. As a result, the pump and treat machinery was able to be removed and the above ground was free to be used for commercial purposes. The savings from using the PRB as opposed to pump and treat were able to pay for the installation in about three years.

=== Elizabeth City, NC ===
In 1996 a 46 m long, 7.3 m deep, .6 m thick PRB was installed at a Coast Guard Facility near Elizabeth City, NC. The goal of this PRB was to remediate a contaminant plume of trichloroethylene (TCE) and hexavalent chromium (Cr (VI)). The PRB took only 6 hours to install using a continuous trenching technique, which simultaneously removed the pre-existing sediment while installing the reactive medium (granular iron). The PRB was configured as a continuous wall as opposed to a funnel-and-gate setup because 3D computer simulations suggested that the two would have the same effectiveness, but cost analyses showed that the continuous setup would be cheaper to install. The total cost of installation was approximately $1 million, while the U.S. Coast Guard predicts that over 20 years $4 million will be saved compared to a pump-and-treat system.

=== Moffett Field, CA ===
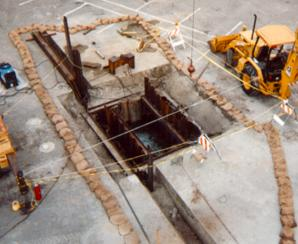
During the installation of a PRB at Moffett Field, CA, click to enlarge

Moffett Field, CA was home to a pilot scale PRB initiated by the U.S. Navy in 1995. The Moffett Field PRB used a funnel and gate design, with the funnel being composed of interlocking steel sheet piles, while the gate consisted of granular zero-valent iron. The primary contaminants were trichloroethene (TCE), cis-1,2 dichloroethene (cDCE), and perchloroethene (PCE). Data from quarterly monitoring, tracer testing, and iron cell coring have been used to determine the effectiveness of the site. Since the first sampling event in June 1996, concentrations of all chlorinated compounds have been reduced to either non-detect levels or below the maximum contaminant levels.

=== Fry Canyon, UT ===
The Fry Canyon site was selected in 1996 as a field demonstration site to assess the removal capabilities of PRBs for uranium. Laboratory experiments were conducted on three potential PRB materials (phosphate, zero-valent iron, and ferric iron) to determine uranium removal efficiencies and hydrologic properties. A PRB material from each class was selected for demonstration. The selected materials had satisfactory hydraulic conductivity, high U removal efficiency, and high compaction strengths. A funnel and gate design was used. The funnels channeled the groundwater into the PRB gates. During the first year, zero-valent iron had lowered U concentration by more than 99.9%, while the amount removed in both the phosphate and the ferric iron exceeded 70% for most of the measurements made. Mechanisms for removing uranium are similar to those for removing other inorganic contaminants, meaning that this study has wide applicability.

== Status of the technology ==
In 1994, analysts estimated that in the U.S. total cleanup costs of groundwater totaled between $500 billion and $1 trillion. Until about 2000, the majority of groundwater remediation was done using "conventional technologies" (e.g., pump-and-treat systems), which have proven costly to meet applicable cleanup standards.
