= ISTD (disambiguation) =

ISTD may refer to:

- Imperial Society of Teachers of Dancing
- In situ thermal desorption (see also Thermal blanket)
- Institute for the Scientific Treatment of Delinquency, now called Centre for Crime and Justice Studies
- International Society of Typographic Designers
