= Lincoln AFB missile site 10 =

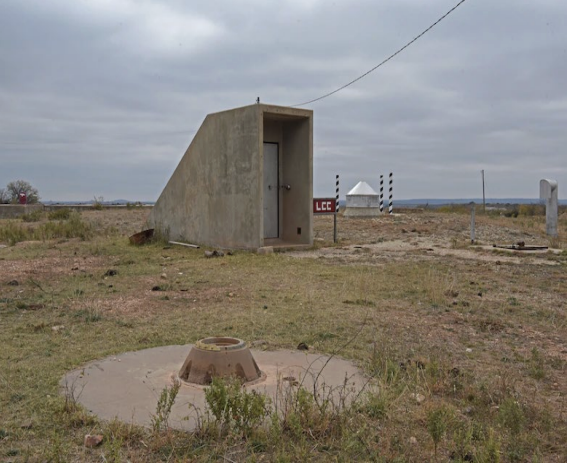
Site 10 complex entry door to the subsurface launch facility

The Aquifer remediation watch area at former Lincoln AFB Atlas "F" missile site 10 is an aquifer remediation project relating to the polluted aquifer underneath York, NE. This project has been going since 2009 where they have been cleaning volatile organic compounds from the soil after pollution had been slowly spreading through the aquifer and the groundwater since the sites decommission in 1965.

== Background ==
The former Lincoln Air Force base (AFB) Atlas missile site 10 (Site 10) is a former Atlas "F" missile launch facility located in York County, a half mile north of Highway 34 and 5 miles west of York, Nebraska. It was operated by the former Lincoln AFB in Lincoln, NE.

Construction of the 6.3-acre site (including the Launch Facility and Launch Control Center) was completed in 1961 as part of a national defense effort to store, maintain, and potentially launch an Atlas Intercontinental Ballistic Missile. The major structure at the site is the Underground Missile Silo, measuring 174 feet in depth and 52 feet in diameter. The silo, constructed of reinforced concrete, was capable of storing a missile 82.5 feet long and 10 feet in diameter. All critical missile elements were contained within the silo. The site was transferred to the General Services Administration and was deactivated and conveyed to private individuals in 1965.

== Regulatory setting ==
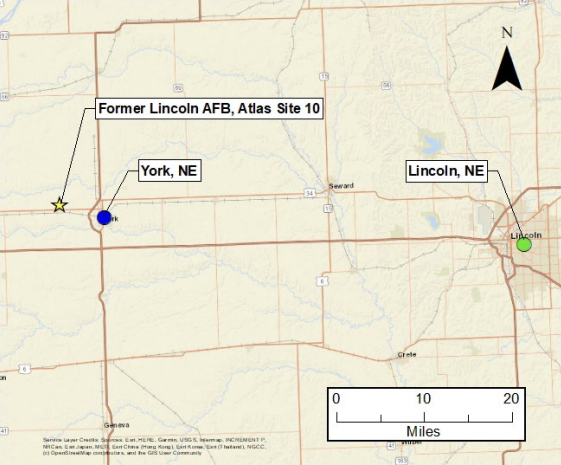
Location map of Former Lincoln AFB Atlas “F” Missile Site 10

The project falls under the authority of the Defense Environmental Restoration Program for Formerly Used Defense Sites (DERP-FUDS) statute [10 USC 2701 (a)(2)] with the lead agency being the United States Army Corps of Engineers(USACE)-Omaha District, which requires that projects addressing hazardous substances, pollutants, and contaminants be conducted consistent with the Comprehensive Environmental, Response, Compensation, and Liability Act. The Nebraska Department of Environment and Energy provides regulatory oversight of the FUDS projects in Nebraska, with assistance from the U.S. Environmental Protection Agency (EPA) and local governments.

== Remedial actions ==
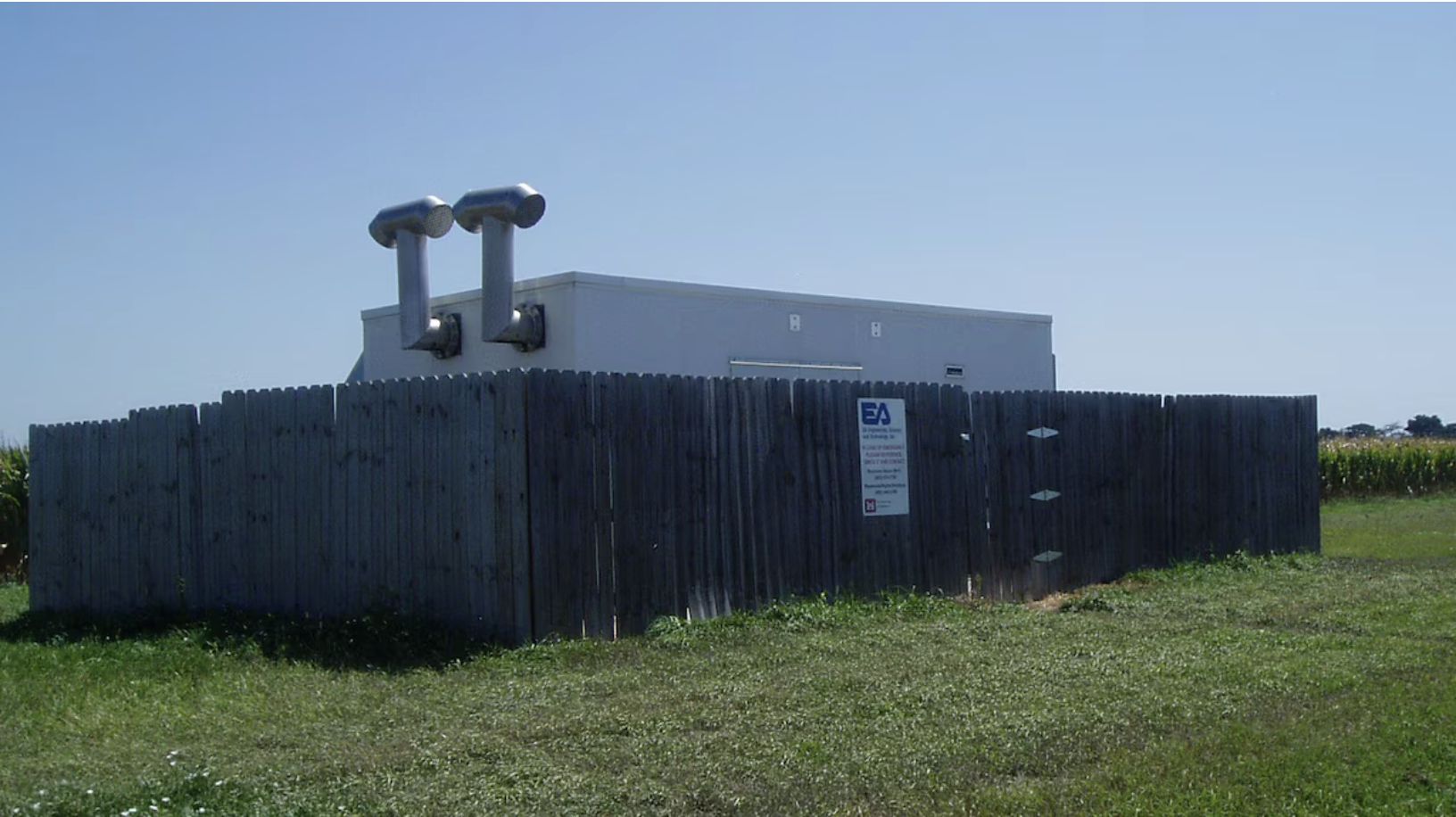
An example of GWTS used in York to remediate

After completing a feasibility study and pilot testing, soil vapor extraction (SVE) as well as groundwater treatment systems(GWTSs) were selected to remove volatile organic compounds (VOCs), mainly trichloroethylene (TCE), from the soil and groundwater. TCE was used during the operation and decommissioning of the former missile site. The Aquifer Remediation/Use Watch Area is the area occupied by and near the edges of the containment plume. This area is frequently visited and watched for possible new users of potable groundwater.

Three GWTSs are installed along the plume, which originated at Site 10. GWTS #2 is located between County Roads I and J on Highway 34. GWTS #1R is located on County K between Hwy 34 and the Burlington Northern Santa Fe (BNSF) railroad line. The last GWTS (GWTS #3) is located on County Road L between W 25th Street and the BNSF railroad line. The SVE system installed at Site 10 was removed from service in 2013 after remediation of the soil at Site 10 was completed.

Since the installation of the GWTS and SVE system in 2008, the TCE plume associated with the release has become segmented, and the point source of the contamination at Site 10 has been remediated. The original GWTS #1, which was located at site 10, was moved downgradient along the plume and is now located between GWTS #2 and GWTS #3 and was renamed GWTS #1R.

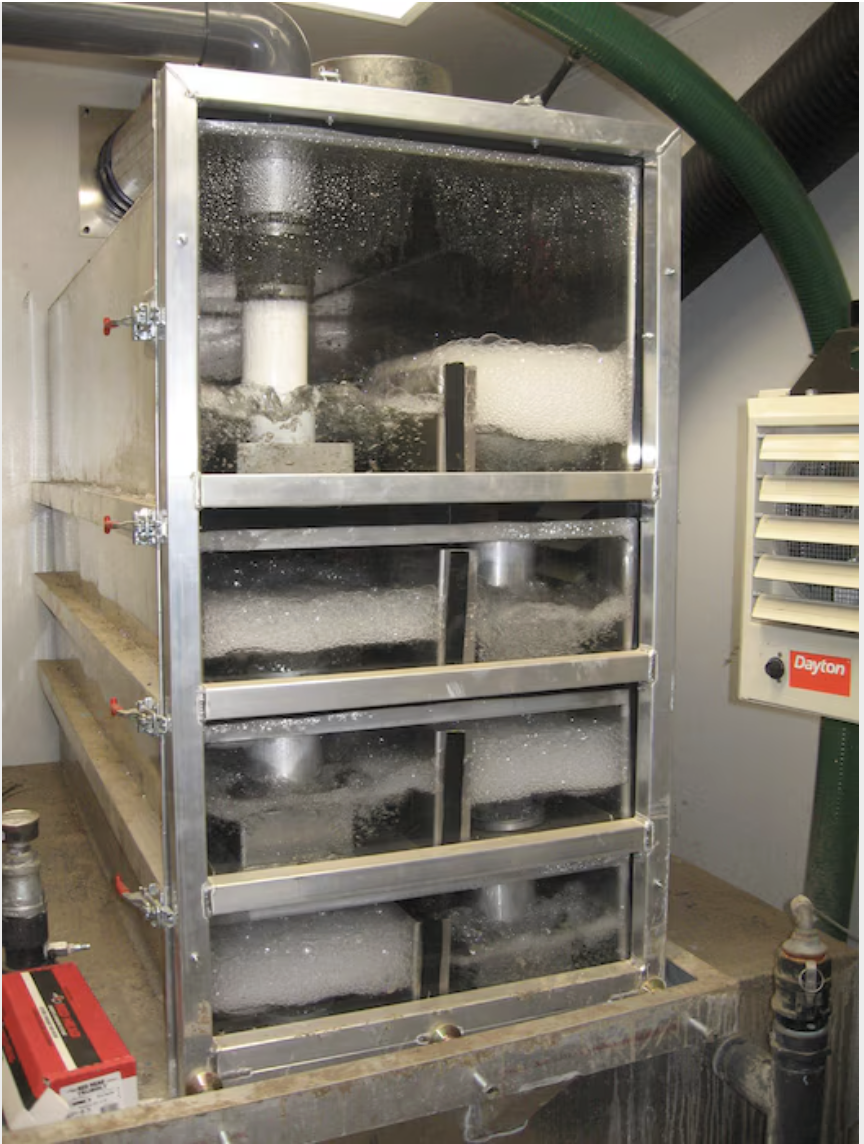
GWTS bubbling system, captured by USGS

Groundwater modeling was completed in 2015 to simulate the movement and distribution of the TCE to enable the best placement of GWTS #1R. Particle tracking was also used to simulate the movement and distribution of the TCE plume. The model provided information to increase capture and remove the contaminants from the plume, and resulted in the relocation of GWTS #1R to a more effective position.

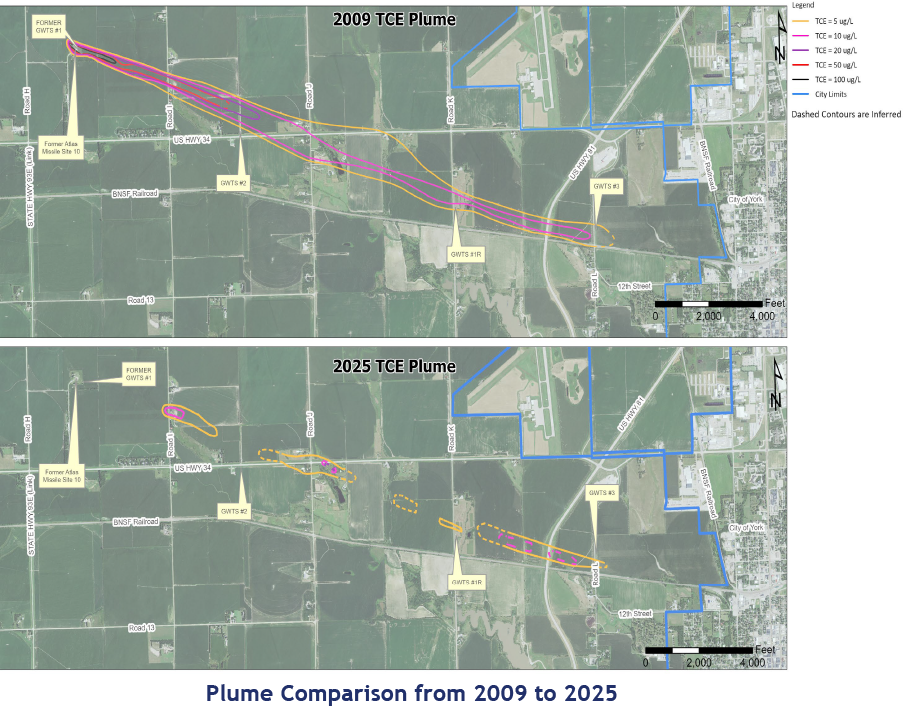
Plume comparison 2009-2025

Map of GWTS relating to Atlas site 10

Additional and more robust modeling was completed in 2018 to evaluate several different remediation scenarios. The model also predicted the segmentation of the plume as it eventually did occur. Residences in proximity to the TCE plume are routinely sampled. Residents whose domestic wells have been impacted by TCE exceeding the Maximum Contaminant Level (MCL) are provided with bottled water or with whole-house treatment.

== Contamination extent ==
The results of previous remedial activities indicate that soil at Site 10 is not a continuing VOC source to groundwater. Groundwater contaminants have decreased significantly over time due to the ongoing remedial efforts to date. The proposed continuing remediation activities include the current treatment of groundwater in the plume by pumping the groundwater, followed by the air stripping of the contaminants, and then reinjection of the treated groundwater back into the aquifer. Groundwater monitoring, the aquifer use watch area, and supply of bottled water/treatment for those residences impacted by TCE above the MCL will also continue.

The length of the original plume, as measured from the point source (the silo) to the downgradient edge of the plume in the City of York, measures approximately 4.5 miles. In comparison, the plume in 2025 has become segmented, has lower TCE concentrations, and measures approximately 3 miles in length. Concentrations of TCE that still exceed the EPA MCL are still present in isolated areas.

The GWTSs have operated continuously 365 days per year since 2008, except for brief shutdowns due to maintenance events, system upgrades, and severe weather. GWTS #2 and GWTS #3 were offline during periods of 2024 and 2025 due to contracting delays, while GWTS #1R continued operating, but all three GWTSs are effectively capturing the contaminants and preventing further migration downgradient, effectively reducing the mass of contaminants.

== See also ==
- Aquifer
- 551st Strategic Missile Squadron
- Ecological restoration
- Pollution
- Groundwater pollution
- York, Nebraska
- Cold War
- Intercontinental ballistic missile
