= ERH =

ERH may refer to:

- ERH (gene), coding for enhancer of rudimentary homolog
- ERH, the IATA airport code for Moulay Ali Cherif Airport, Errichidia, Morocco
- Electrical resistance heating
- Era Aviation, a defunct American airline
- Erith railway station, in London
- Eruwa language
- Extended Riemann hypothesis
- Nieh Erh (1912–1935), Chinese composer
