= Environmental remediation =

Removal of pollution from soil, groundwater, etc

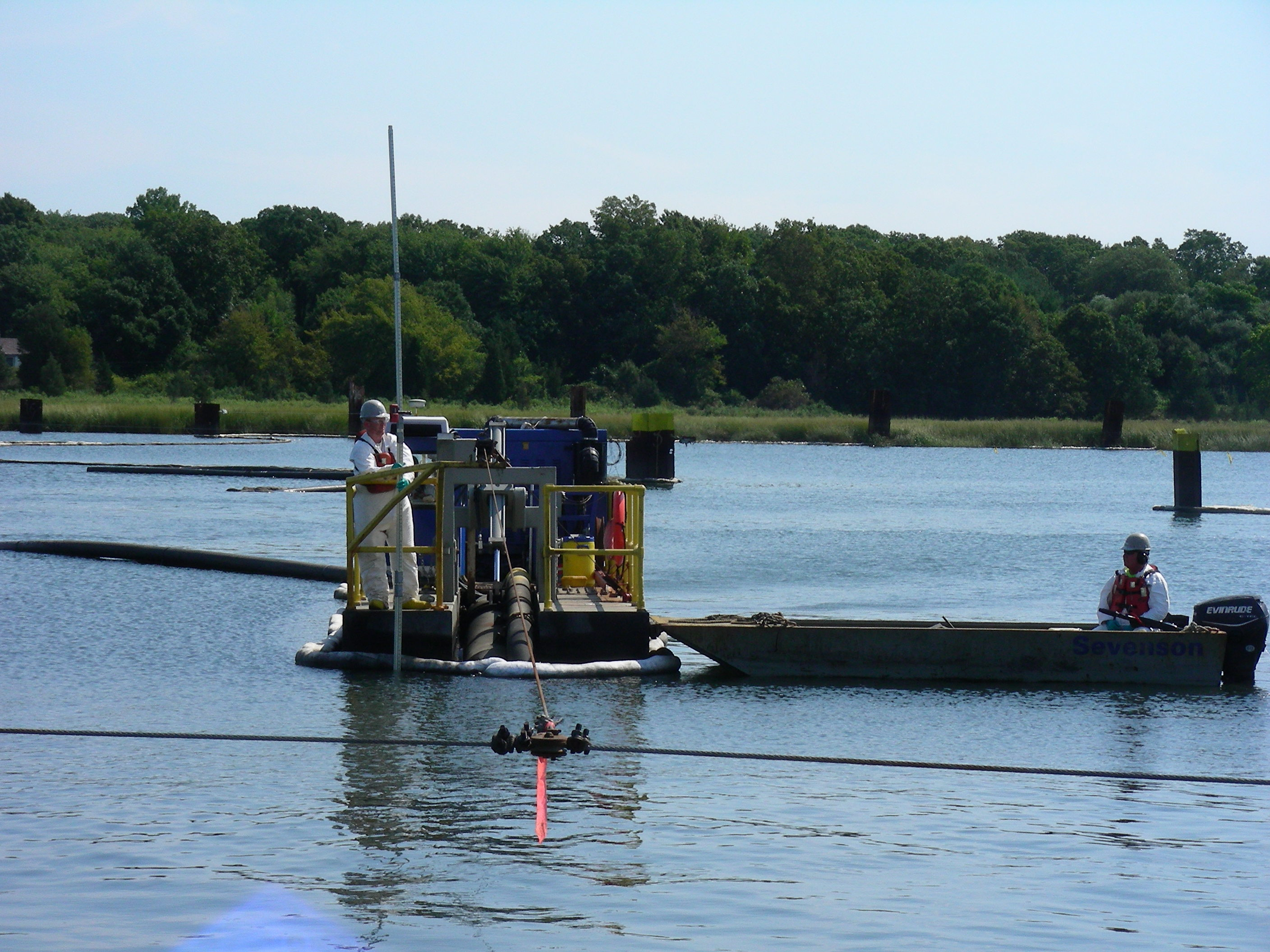
Dredging contaminated sediment in New Bedford Harbor, Massachusetts. The harbor is contaminated with polychlorinated biphenyls (PCBs).

Environmental remediation is the cleanup of hazardous substances dealing with the removal, treatment and containment of pollution or contaminants from environmental media such as soil, groundwater, sediment. Remediation may be required by regulations before development of land revitalization projects. Developers who agree to voluntary cleanup may be offered incentives under state or municipal programs like New York State's Brownfield Cleanup Program. If remediation is done by removal the waste materials are simply transported off-site for disposal at another location. The waste material can also be contained by physical barriers like slurry walls. The use of slurry walls is well-established in the construction industry. The application of (low) pressure grouting, used to mitigate soil liquefaction risks in San Francisco and other earthquake zones, has achieved mixed results in field tests to create barriers, and site-specific results depend upon many variable conditions that can greatly impact outcomes.

Remedial action is generally subject to an array of regulatory requirements, and may also be based on assessments of human health and ecological risks where no legislative standards exist, or where standards are advisory.

== Remediation standards ==
In the United States, the most comprehensive set of Preliminary Remediation Goals (PRGs) is from the Environmental Protection Agency (EPA) Regional Screening Levels (RSLs). A set of standards used in Europe exists and is often called the Dutch standards. The European Union (EU) is rapidly moving towards Europe-wide standards, although most of the industrialised nations in Europe have their own standards at present. In Canada, most standards for remediation are set by the provinces individually, but the Canadian Council of Ministers of the Environment provides guidance at a federal level in the form of the Canadian Environmental Quality Guidelines and the Canada-Wide Standards|Canada-Wide Standard for Petroleum Hydrocarbons in Soil.

== Site assessment ==
Once a site is suspected of being contaminated there is a need to assess the contamination. Often the assessment begins with preparation of a Phase I Environmental Site Assessment. The historical use of the site and the materials used and produced on site will guide the assessment strategy and type of sampling and chemical analysis to be done. Often nearby sites owned by the same company or which are nearby and have been reclaimed, levelled or filled are also contaminated even where the current land use seems innocuous. Off-site contamination of nearby sites often occur through decades of emissions to soil, groundwater, and air. For example, a car park may have been levelled by using contaminated waste in the fill. Ceiling dust, topsoil, surface and groundwater of nearby properties should also be tested, both before and after any remediation. This is a controversial step as:

1. No one wants to have to pay for the cleanup of the site;
2. If nearby properties are found to be contaminated, it may have to be noted on their property title, potentially affecting the value;
3. No one wants to pay for the cost of assessment.

Often corporations which do voluntary testing of their sites are protected from the reports to environmental agencies becoming public under freedom of information acts; however, a "Freedom of Information" inquiry will often produce other documents that are not protected or will produce references to the reports.

== Funding remediation ==
In the US there has been a mechanism for taxing polluting industries to form a Superfund to remediate abandoned sites, or to litigate to force corporations to remediate their contaminated sites. Other countries have other mechanisms and commonly sites are rezoned to "higher" uses such as high density housing, to give the land a higher value so that after deducting cleanup costs there is still an incentive for a developer to purchase the land, clean it up, redevelop it and sell it on, often as apartments (home units).

== Mapping remediation ==
There are several tools for mapping these sites and which allow the user to view additional information. One such tool is TOXMAP, a Geographic Information System (GIS) from the Division of Specialized Information Services of the United States National Library of Medicine (NLM) that uses maps of the United States to help users visually explore data from the United States Environmental Protection Agency's (EPA) Superfund and Toxics Release Inventory programs.

== Technologies ==
Remediation technologies are many and varied but can generally be categorized into ex-situ and in-situ methods. Ex-situ methods involve excavation of affected soils and subsequent treatment at the surface as well as extraction of contaminated groundwater and treatment at the surface. In-situ methods seek to treat the contamination without removing the soils or groundwater. Various technologies have been developed for remediation of oil-contaminated soil/sediments.

Traditional remediation approaches consist of soil excavation and disposal to landfill and groundwater "pump and treat". In-situ technologies include but are not limited to: solidification and stabilization, soil vapor extraction, permeable reactive barriers, monitored natural attenuation, bioremediation-phytoremediation, chemical oxidation, steam-enhanced extraction and in situ thermal desorption and have been used extensively in the USA.

=== Barriers ===
Contaminants can be removed from a site or controlled. One option for control are barrier walls, which can be temporary to prevent contamination during treatment and removal, or more permanent. Techniques to construct barrier walls are deep soil mixing, jet grouting, low pressure grouting with cement and chemicals, freezing and slurry walls. Barrier walls must be constructed of impermeable materials and resistant to deterioration from contact with waste, for the lifespan of the barrier wall. As newer polymer and chemical grouts were used in the 1950s and 1960s, Federal agencies of the US government recognized the need to establish a minimum project life of 50 years in real-world applications.

The Department of Energy is one US government agency that sponsors research to formulate, test and determine use applications for innovative polymer grouts used in waste containment barriers. Portland cement was used in the past; however, cracking and poor performance under wet-dry conditions at arid sites need improved materials to remedy. Sites that need remediation have variable humidity, moisture and soil conditions. Field implementation remains challenging: different environmental and site conditions require different materials and the placement technologies are specific to the characteristics of the compounds used which vary in viscosity, gel time and density:

"The selection of subsurface barriers for any given site which needs remediation, and the selection of a particular barrier technology must be done, however, by means of the Superfund Process, with special emphasis on the remedial investigation and feasibility study portions. The chemical compatibility of the material with the wastes, leachates and geology with which it is likely to come in contact is of particular importance for barriers constructed from fluids which are supposed to set in-situ. EPA emphasizes this compatibility in its guidance documents, noting that thorough characterization of the waste, leachate, barrier material chemistry, site geochemistry, and compatibility testing of the barrier material with the likely disposal site chemical environment are all required."

These guidelines are for all materials – experimental and traditional.

=== Thermal desorption ===
Thermal desorption is a technology for soil remediation. During the process a desorber volatilizes the contaminants (e.g. oil, mercury or hydrocarbon) to separate them from especially soil or sludge. After that the contaminants can either be collected or destroyed in an offgas treatment system.

=== Excavation or dredging ===
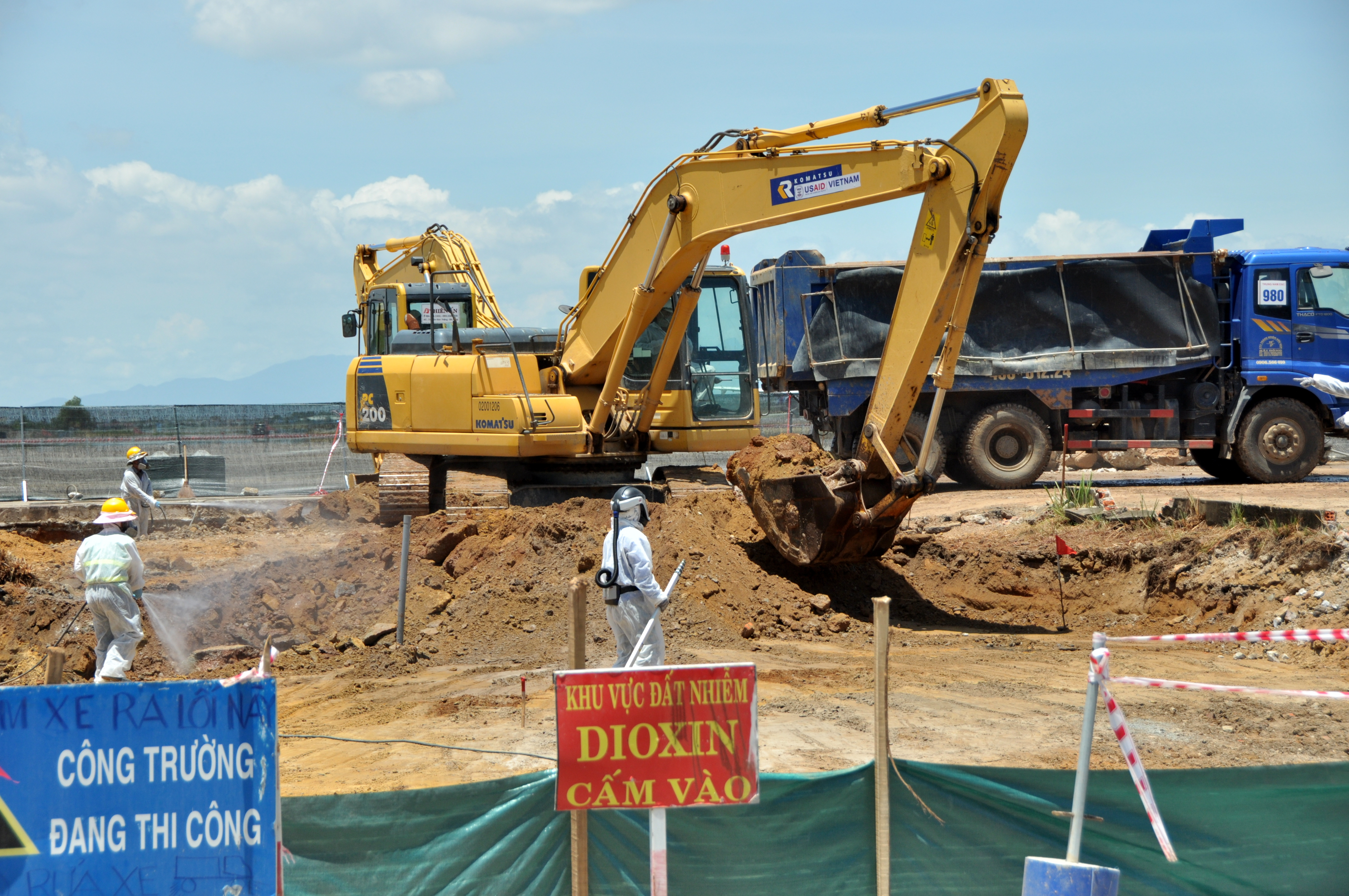
Excavation of soil contaminated with dioxins at Da Nang International Airport in Vietnam.

Excavation processes can be as simple as hauling the contaminated soil to a regulated landfill, but can also involve aerating the excavated material in the case of volatile organic compounds (VOCs). Recent advancements in bioaugmentation and biostimulation of the excavated material have also proven to be able to remediate semi-volatile organic compounds (SVOCs) onsite. If the contamination affects a river or bay bottom, then dredging of bay mud or other silty clays containing contaminants (including sewage sludge with harmful microorganisms) may be conducted.

Recently, ExSitu Chemical oxidation has also been utilized in the remediation of contaminated soil. This process involves the excavation of the contaminated area into large bermed areas where they are treated using chemical oxidation methods.

=== Surfactant enhanced aquifer remediation (SEAR) ===
This is used in removing non-aqueous phase liquids (NAPLs) from aquifer. This is done by pumping surfactant solution into contaminated aquifer using injection wells which are passed through contaminated zones to the extraction wells. The Surfactant solution containing contaminants is then captured and pumped out by extraction wells for further treatment at the surface. Then the water after treatment is discharged into surface water or re-injected into groundwater.

In geologic formations that allow delivery of hydrocarbon mitigation agents or specialty surfactants, this approach provides a cost-effective and permanent solution to sites that have been previously unsuccessful utilizing other remedial approaches. This technology is also successful when utilized as the initial step in a multi-faceted remedial approach utilizing SEAR then In situ Oxidation, bioremediation enhancement or soil vapor extraction (SVE).

=== Pump and treat ===
Pump and treat involves pumping out contaminated groundwater with the use of a submersible or vacuum pump, and allowing the extracted groundwater to be purified by slowly proceeding through a series of vessels that contain materials designed to adsorb the contaminants from the groundwater. For petroleum-contaminated sites this material is usually activated carbon in granular form. Chemical reagents such as flocculants followed by sand filters may also be used to decrease the contamination of groundwater. Air stripping is a method that can be effective for volatile pollutants such as BTEX compounds found in gasoline.

For most biodegradable materials like BTEX, MTBE and most hydrocarbons, bioreactors can be used to clean the contaminated water to non-detectable levels. With fluidized bed bioreactors it is possible to achieve very low discharge concentrations which will meet or exceed discharge requirements for most pollutants.

Depending on geology and soil type, pump and treat may be a good method to quickly reduce high concentrations of pollutants. It is more difficult to reach sufficiently low concentrations to satisfy remediation standards, due to the equilibrium of absorption/desorption processes in the soil. However, pump and treat is typically not the best form of remediation. It is expensive to treat the groundwater, and typically is a very slow process to clean up a release with pump and treat. It is best suited to control the hydraulic gradient and keep a release from spreading further. Better options of in-situ treatment often include air sparge/soil vapor extraction (AS/SVE) or dual phase extraction/multiphase extraction (DPE/MPE). Other methods include trying to increase the dissolved oxygen content of the groundwater to support microbial degradation of the compound (especially petroleum) by direct injection of oxygen into the subsurface, or the direct injection of a slurry that slowly releases oxygen over time (typically magnesium peroxide or calcium oxy-hydroxide).

=== Solidification and stabilization ===
Solidification and stabilization work has a reasonably good track record but also a set of serious deficiencies related to durability of solutions and potential long-term effects. In addition CO_{2} emissions due to the use of cement are also becoming a major obstacle to its widespread use in solidification/stabilization projects.

Stabilization/solidification (S/S) is a remediation and treatment technology that relies on the reaction between a binder and soil to stop/prevent or reduce the mobility of contaminants.

- Stabilization involves the addition of reagents to a contaminated material (e.g. soil or sludge) to produce more chemically stable constituents; and
- Solidification involves the addition of reagents to a contaminated material to impart physical/dimensional stability to contain contaminants in a solid product and reduce access by external agents (e.g. air, rainfall).

Conventional S/S is an established remediation technology for contaminated soils and treatment technology for hazardous wastes in many countries in the world. However, the uptake of S/S technologies has been relatively modest, and a number of barriers have been identified including:

- the relatively low cost and widespread use of disposal to landfill;
- the lack of authoritative technical guidance on S/S;
- uncertainty over the durability and rate of contaminant release from S/S-treated material;
- experiences of past poor practice in the application of cement stabilization processes used in waste disposal in the 1980s and 1990s (ENDS, 1992); and
- residual liability associated with immobilized contaminants remaining on-site, rather than their removal or destruction.

=== In situ oxidation ===
New in situ oxidation technologies have become popular for remediation of a wide range of soil and groundwater contaminants. Remediation by chemical oxidation involves the injection of strong oxidants such as hydrogen peroxide, ozone gas, potassium permanganate or persulfates.

Oxygen gas or ambient air can also be injected to promote growth of aerobic bacteria which accelerate natural attenuation of organic contaminants. One disadvantage of this approach is the possibility of decreasing anaerobic contaminant destruction natural attenuation where existing conditions enhance anaerobic bacteria which normally live in the soil prefer a reducing environment. In general, aerobic activity is much faster than anaerobic and overall destruction rates are typically greater when aerobic activity can be successfully promoted.

The injection of gases into the groundwater may also cause contamination to spread faster than normal depending on the hydrogeology of the site. In these cases, injections downgradient of groundwater flow may provide adequate microbial destruction of contaminants prior to exposure to surface waters or drinking water supply wells.

Migration of metal contaminants must also be considered whenever modifying subsurface oxidation-reduction potential. Certain metals are more soluble in oxidizing environments while others are more mobile in reducing environments.

=== Soil vapor extraction ===
Soil vapor extraction (SVE) is an effective remediation technology for soil. "Multi-phase extraction" (MPE) is also an effective remediation technology when soil and groundwater are to be remediated coincidentally. SVE and MPE utilize different technologies to treat the off-gas volatile organic compounds (VOCs) generated after vacuum removal of air and vapors (and VOCs) from the subsurface and include granular activated carbon (most commonly used historically), thermal and/or catalytic oxidation and vapor condensation. Generally, carbon is used for low (below 500 ppmV) VOC concentration vapor streams, oxidation is used for moderate (up to 4,000 ppmV) VOC concentration streams, and vapor condensation is used for high (over 4,000 ppmV) VOC concentration vapor streams. Below is a brief summary of each technology.

1. Granular activated carbon (GAC) is used as a filter for air or water. Commonly used to filter tap water in household sinks. GAC is a highly porous adsorbent material, produced by heating organic matter, such as coal, wood and coconut shell, in the absence of air, which is then crushed into granules. Activated carbon is positively charged and therefore able to remove negative ions from the water such as organic ions, ozone, chlorine, fluorides and dissolved organic solutes by adsorption onto the activated carbon. The activated carbon must be replaced periodically as it may become saturated and unable to adsorb (i.e. reduced absorption efficiency with loading). Activated carbon is not effective in removing heavy metals.
2. Thermal oxidation (or incineration) can also be an effective remediation technology. This approach is somewhat controversial because of the risks of dioxins released in the atmosphere through the exhaust gases or effluent off-gas. Controlled, high temperature incineration with filtering of exhaust gases however should not pose any risks. Two different technologies can be employed to oxidize the contaminants of an extracted vapor stream. The selection of either thermal or catalytic depends on the type and concentration in parts per million by volume of constituent in the vapor stream. Thermal oxidation is more useful for higher concentration (~4,000 ppmV) influent vapor streams (which require less natural gas usage) than catalytic oxidation at ~2,000 ppmV.
- Thermal oxidation which uses a system that acts as a furnace and maintains temperatures ranging from 1,350 to 1,500 °F (730 to 820 °C).
- Catalytic oxidation which uses a catalyst on a support to facilitate a lower temperature oxidation. This system usually maintains temperatures ranging from 600 to 800 °F (316 to 427 °C).
1. Vapor condensation is the most effective off-gas treatment technology for high (over 4,000 ppmV) VOC concentration vapor streams. The process involves cryogenically cooling the vapor stream to below 40 degrees C such that the VOCs condensate out of the vapor stream and into liquid form where it is collected in steel containers. The liquid form of the VOCs is referred to as dense non-aqueous phase liquids (DNAPL) when the source of the liquid consists predominantly of solvents or light non-aqueous phase liquids (LNAPL) when the source of the liquid consists predominantly of petroleum or fuel products. This recovered chemical can then be reused or recycled in a more environmentally sustainable or green manner than the alternatives described above. This technology is also known as cryogenic cooling and compression (C3-Technology).

=== Nanoremediation ===
Using nano-sized reactive agents to degrade or immobilize contaminants is termed nanoremediation. In soil or groundwater nanoremediation, nanoparticles are brought into contact with the contaminant through either in situ injection or a pump-and-treat process. The nanomaterials then degrade organic contaminants through redox reactions or adsorb to and immobilize metals such as lead or arsenic. In commercial settings, this technology has been dominantly applied to groundwater remediation, with research into wastewater treatment. Research is also investigating how nanoparticles may be applied to cleanup of soil and gases.

Nanomaterials are highly reactive because of their high surface area per unit mass, and due to this reactivity nanomaterials may react with target contaminants at a faster rate than would larger particles. Most field applications of nanoremediation have used nano zero-valent iron (nZVI), which may be emulsified or mixed with another metal to enhance dispersion.

That nanoparticles are highly reactive can mean that they rapidly clump together or react with soil particles or other material in the environment, limiting their dispersal to target contaminants. Some of the important challenges currently limiting nanoremediation technologies include identifying coatings or other formulations that increase dispersal of the nanoparticle agents to better reach target contaminants while limiting any potential toxicity to bioremediation agents, wildlife, or people.

Nanotechnology-based advanced oxidation processes in environmental remediation

Advanced oxidation processes (AOPs) are a group of physicochemical technologies used in environmental remediation to remove persistent organic pollutants from water and soil, including pharmaceuticals, pesticides, and industrial chemicals. These contaminants are environmentally relevant due to their continuous release, chemical stability, and biological activity, and they are often insufficiently removed by conventional treatment methods such as adsorption or membrane filtration.

AOPs are based on the in situ generation of highly reactive oxygen species, primarily hydroxyl radicals (•OH), which exhibit strong and non-selective oxidation capacity and can mineralize organic pollutants into carbon dioxide, water, and inorganic ions. Because they focus on contaminant destruction rather than phase transfer, AOPs are considered an effective alternative to conventional remediation technologies.

Among AOPs, heterogeneous photocatalysis has been extensively studied for environmental applications. This process typically employs semiconductor photocatalysts activated by ultraviolet or solar radiation to initiate redox reactions at the catalyst surface. Titanium dioxide (TiO₂) and zinc oxide (ZnO) are the most widely investigated photocatalysts due to their suitable bandgap energies, chemical stability, relatively low toxicity, and cost-effectiveness.

Photocatalytic performance is strongly influenced by crystal structure, surface chemistry, and electron–hole recombination dynamics. To improve efficiency, material modification strategies such as metal and non-metal doping, semiconductor coupling, and surface sensitization have been developed to enhance charge separation and extend activity into the visible region of the solar spectrum. These nanotechnology-enabled AOPs are increasingly regarded as promising tools for sustainable water and soil remediation, particularly in agri-food systems.

=== Bioremediation ===
Bioremediation is a process that treats a polluted area either by altering environmental conditions to stimulate growth of microorganisms or through natural microorganism activity, resulting in the degradation of the target pollutants. Broad categories of bioremediation include biostimulation, bioaugmentation, and natural recovery (natural attenuation). Bioremediation is either done on the contaminated site (in situ) or after the removal of contaminated soils at another more controlled site (ex situ).

In the past, it has been difficult to turn to bioremediation as an implemented policy solution, as lack of adequate production of remediating microbes led to little options for implementation. Those that manufacture microbes for bioremediation must be approved by the EPA; however, the EPA traditionally has been more cautious about negative externalities that may or may not arise from the introduction of these species. One of their concerns is that the toxic chemicals would lead to the microbe's gene degradation, which would then be passed on to other harmful bacteria, creating more issues, if the pathogens evolve the ability to feed off of pollutants.

==== Entomoremediation ====
Entomoremediation is a variant of bioremediation in which insects decontaminate soils. Entomoremediation techniques engage microorganisms, collembolans, ants, flies, beetles, and termites. It is dependent on saprophytic insect larvae, resistant to adverse environmental conditions and able to bioaccumulate toxic heavy metal contaminants.

Hermetia illucens (black soldier fly - BSF) is an important entomoremediation participant. H. illucens has been observed to reduce polluted substrate dry weight by 49%. H. illucens larvae have been observed to accumulate cadmium at a concentration of 93% and bioaccumulation factor of 5.6, lead, mercury, zinc with a bioaccumulation factor of 3.6, and arsenic at a concentration of 22%. Black soldier fly larvae (BSFL) have also been used to monitor the degradation and reduction of anthropogenic oil contamination in the environment.

Entomoremediation is considered viable as an accessible low-energy, low-carbon, and highly renewable method for environmental decontamination.

=== Collapsing air microbubbles ===
Cleaning of oil contaminated sediments with self collapsing air microbubbles have been recently explored as a chemical free technology. Air microbubbles generated in water without adding any surfactant could be used to clean oil contaminated sediments. This technology holds promise over the use of chemicals (mainly surfactant) for traditional washing of oil contaminated sediments.

== Community consultation and information ==
In preparation for any significant remediation there should be extensive community consultation. The proponent should both present information to and seek information from the community. The proponent needs to learn about "sensitive" (future) uses like childcare, schools, hospitals, and playgrounds as well as community concerns and interests information. Consultation should be open, on a group basis so that each member of the community is informed about issues they may not have individually thought about.

An independent chairperson acceptable to both the proponent and the community should be engaged (at proponent expense if a fee is required). Minutes of meetings including questions asked and the answers to them and copies of presentations by the proponent should be available both on the internet and at a local library (even a school library) or community centre.

== Incremental health risk ==
Incremental health risk is the increased risk that a receptor (normally a human being living nearby) will face from (the lack of) a remediation project. The use of incremental health risk is based on carcinogenic and other (e.g., mutagenic, teratogenic) effects and often involves value judgements about the acceptable projected rate of increase in cancer. In some jurisdictions, this is 1 in 1,000,000, but in other jurisdictions, the acceptable projected rate of increase is 1 in 100,000.

A relatively small incremental health risk from a single project is not of much comfort if the area already has a relatively high health risk from other operations like incinerators or other emissions, or if other projects exist at the same time causing a greater cumulative risk or an unacceptably high total risk. An analogy often used by remediators is to compare the risk of the remediation on nearby residents to the risks of death through car accidents or tobacco smoking.

== Emissions standards ==
Standards are set for the levels of dust, noise, odour, emissions to air and groundwater, and discharge to sewers or waterways of all chemicals of concern or chemicals likely to be produced during the remediation by processing of the contaminants. These are compared against both natural background levels in the area and standards for areas zoned as nearby areas are zoned and against standards used in other recent remediations. Just because the emission is emanating from an area zoned industrial does not mean that in a nearby residential area there should be permitted any exceedances of the appropriate residential standards.

Monitoring for compliance against each standards is critical to ensure that exceedances are detected and reported both to authorities and the local community.

Enforcement is necessary to ensure that continued or significant breaches result in fines or even a jail sentence for the polluter.

Penalties must be significant as otherwise fines are treated as a normal expense of doing business. Compliance must be cheaper than to have continuous breaches.

== Transport and emergency safety assessment ==
Assessment should be made of the risks of operations, transporting contaminated material, disposal of waste which may be contaminated including workers' clothes, and a formal emergency response plan should be developed. Every worker and visitor entering the site should have a safety induction personalised to their involvement with the site.

== Impacts of funding remediation ==
Local communities and government often resist the rezoning because of the adverse effects of the remediation and new development on the local amenities. The main impacts during remediation are noise, dust, odour, and incremental health risk. Then there is the noise, dust, and traffic of developments. Then, there is the impact on local traffic, schools, playing fields, and other public facilities due to the increased population.

== Examples of major remediation projects ==
=== Homebush Bay, New South Wales, Australia ===
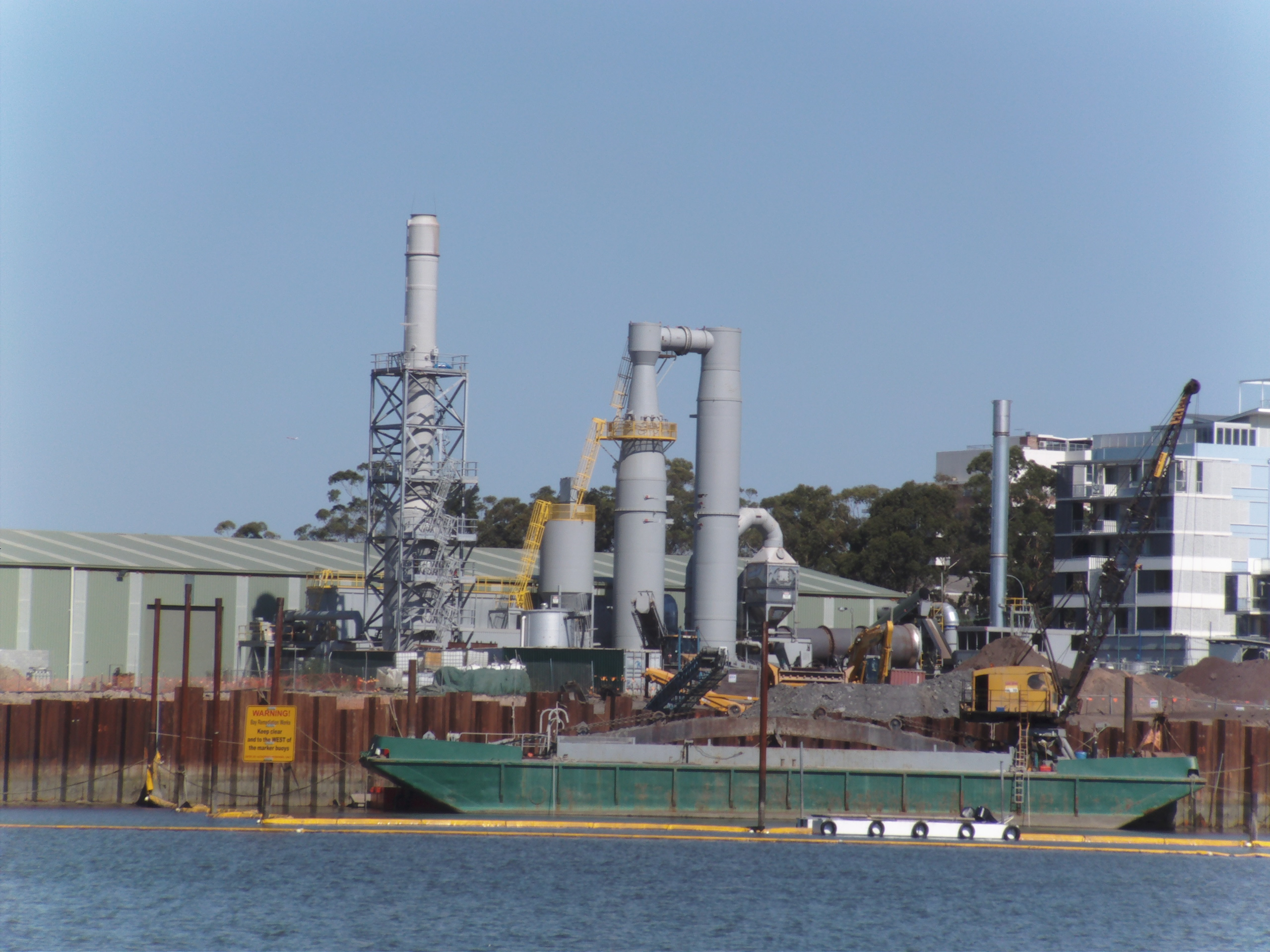
Remediation of pesticide plant on Homebush Bay.

Dioxins from Union Carbide used in the production of now-banned pesticide 2,4,5-Trichlorophenoxyacetic acid and defoliant Agent Orange polluted Homebush Bay. Remediation was completed in 2010, but fishing will continue to be banned for decades.

=== Bakar, Croatia ===
An EU contract for immobilization of a polluted area of 20,000 m^{3} in Bakar, Croatia, based on solidification/stabilization with ImmoCem is currently in progress. After three years of intensive research by the Croatian government, the EU funded the immobilization project in Bakar. The area is contaminated with large amounts of TPH, PAH, and metals. For the immobilization, the contractor chose to use the mix-in-plant procedure.

== See also ==
=== General links ===
- Biodegradation
- Bioremediation
- Brownfield land
- In situ capping of subaqueous waste
- In situ chemical oxidation
- In situ thermal desorption
- Ecological restoration
- Ecotoxicity
- Electrical resistance heating
- Electrokinetic remediation
- Environmental restoration
- Groundwater remediation
- Microplastic remediation
- Natural attenuation
- Phase I environmental site assessment
- Phytoremediation
- Remediation of contaminated sites with cement
- Soil contamination
- Soil vapor extraction

=== Legislation about remediation ===
- Superfund (United States)
- Contaminated Land Management Act (New South Wales, Australia)
- 'Contaminated Sites Act 2003' (Western Australia, Australia)
- Wet Bodembescherming ('Soil Protection Act', Netherlands)
- Wet Verontreiniging Oppervlaktewater ('Surfacewater Pollution Act', Netherlands)
- 'Environmental Management Act' (Canada)

=== Environmental groups with information ===
- CHEJ (US - Grew out of Love Canal controversy)
- Greenpeace (International organisation with National sites)

=== Environmental protection agencies ===
- United States Environmental Protection Agency
- NSW EPA (NSW, Australia)
- Environment and Climate Change Canada
- Canadian EPA Summary Table

== See also ==
- List of cleaning companies
