= Sparging =

Sparging may refer to:

- Sparging (chemistry), a process in which a gas is bubbled through a liquid to remove other gases or volatile compounds
- Air sparging, a remediation process in which air is pushed through contaminated water or soil to remove volatile pollutants
- Sparging, a step in lautering (a process used in brewing beer) in which water is trickled through the grain to extract sugars
- Sparging, deodorization of edible oil by passing steam through it
- Sparging, hydrogenation of edible oil using hydrogen and a catalyst
