= Thermal desorption =

Environmental remediation using heat

Thermal desorption is an environmental remediation technology that utilizes heat to increase the volatility of contaminants such that they can be removed (separated) from the solid matrix (typically soil, sludge or filter cake sediment). The volatilized contaminants are then either collected or thermally destroyed. A thermal desorption system therefore has two major components; the desorber itself and the offgas treatment system. Thermal desorption is not incineration.

== History ==
Thermal desorption first appeared as an environmental treatment technology in 1985 when it was specified in the Record of Decision for the McKin Company Superfund site within the Royal River watershed in Maine.

It is frequently referred to as "low temp" thermal desorption to differentiate it from high temperature incineration. An early direct fired thermal desorption project was the treatment of 8000 tons of toxaphene (a chlorinated pesticide) contaminated sandy soil at the S&S Flying Services site in Marianna Florida in 1990, with later projects exceeding 170,000 tons at the Cape Fear coal tar site in 1999. A status report from the United States Environmental Protection Agency shows that thermal desorption has been used at 69 Superfund sites through FY2000. In addition, hundreds of remediation projects have been completed using thermal desorption at non-Superfund sites.

For in-situ on-site treatment options, only incineration and stabilization have been used at more Superfund sites. Incineration suffers from poor public acceptance. Stabilization does not provide a permanent remedy, since the contaminants are still on site. Thermal desorption is a widely accepted technology that provides a permanent solution at an economically competitive cost.

The world’s first large-scale thermal desorption for treatment of mercury-containing wastes was erected in Wölsau, for the remediation of the Chemical Factory Marktredwitz (founded in 1788) was considered to be the oldest in Germany. Operation commenced in October 1993 including the first optimising phase. 50,000 tons of mercury-contaminated solid wastes were treated successfully between August 1993 and June 1996. 25 metric tons of mercury had been recovered from soil and rubble. Unfortunately the Marktredwitz plant is often misunderstood in the literature as a pilot-scale plant only.

== Desorbers ==
Numerous desorber types are available today. Some of the more common types are listed below.

- Indirect fired rotary
- Direct fired rotary
- Heated screw (hot oil, molten salt, electric)
- Infrared
- Microwave

Most indirect fired rotary systems use an inclined rotating metallic cylinder to heat the feed material. The heat transfer mechanism is usually conduction through the cylinder wall. In this type of system neither the flame nor the products of combustion can contact the feed solids or the offgas. Think of it as a rotating pipe inside a furnace with both ends sticking outside of the furnace. The cylinder for full-scale transportable systems is typically five to eight feet in diameter with heated lengths ranging from twenty to fifty feet. With a carbon steel shell, the maximum solids temperature is around 1,000 °F, while temperatures of 1,800 °F with special alloy cylinders are attainable. Total residence time in this type of desorber normally ranges from 30 to 120 minutes. Treatment capacities can range from 2 to 30 tons per hour for transportable units.

Direct-fired rotary desorbers have been used extensively over the years for petroleum contaminated soils and soils contaminated with Resource Conservation and Recovery Act hazardous wastes as defined by the United States Environmental Protection Agency. A 1992 paper on treating petroleum contaminated soils estimated that between 20 and 30 contractors have 40 to 60 rotary dryer systems available. Today, it is probably closer to 6 to 10 contractors with 15 to 20 portable systems commercially available. The majority of these systems utilize a secondary combustion chamber (afterburner) or catalytic oxidizer to thermally destroy the volatilized organics. A few of these systems also have a quench and scrubber after the oxidizer which allows them to treat soils containing chlorinated organics such as solvents and pesticides. The desorbing cylinder for full-scale transportable systems is typically four to ten feet in diameter with heated lengths ranging from twenty to fifty feet. The maximum practical solids temperature for these systems is around 750 to 900 °F depending on the material of construction of the cylinder. Total residence time in this type of desorber normally ranges from 3 to 15 minutes. Treatment capacities can range from 6 to over 100 tons per hour for transportable units.

Heated screw systems are also an indirect heated system. Typically they use a jacketed trough with a double auger that intermeshes. The augers themselves frequently contain passages for the heating medium to increase the heat transfer surface area. Some systems use electric resistance heaters instead of a heat transfer media and may employ a single auger in each housing. The augers can range from 12 to 36 inches in diameter for full-scale systems, with lengths up to 20 feet. The auger/trough assemblies can be connected in parallel and/or series to increase throughput. Full scale capabilities up to 4 tons per hour have been demonstrated. This type of system has been most successful treating refinery wastes.

In the early days, there was a continuous infrared system that is no longer in common use. In theory, microwaves would be an excellent technical choice since uniform and accurately controlled heating can be achieved with no heat transfer surface fouling problems. One can only guess that capital and/or energy costs have prevented the development of a microwave thermal desorber at the commercial scale.

== Offgas treatment ==
There are only three basic options for offgas treatment available. The volatilized contaminants in the offgas can either be discharged to atmosphere, collected or destroyed. In some cases, both a collection and destruction system are employed. In addition to managing the volatilized components, the particulate solids (dust) that exit the desorber must also be removed from the offgas.

When a collection system is used, the offgas must be cooled to condense the bulk of the volatilized components into a liquid. The offgas will exit most desorbers in the 350–900 °F range. The offgas is then typically cooled to somewhere between 120 and 40 °F to condense the bulk of the volatilized water and organic contaminants. Even at 40 °F, there may be measurable amounts of non-condensed organics. For this reason, after the condensation step, further treatment of the offgas is usually required. The cooled offgas may be treated by carbon adsorption, or thermal oxidation. Thermal oxidation can be accomplished using a catalytic oxidizer, an afterburner or by routing the offgas to the combustion heat source for the desorber. The volume of gas requiring treatment for indirect fired desorbers is a fraction of that required for a direct fired desorber. This requires smaller air pollution control trains for the gaseous process vent emissions. Some thermal desorption systems recycle the carrier gas, thereby further reducing the volume of gaseous emissions.

The condensed liquid from cooling the offgas is separated into organic and aqueous fractions. The water is either disposed of or used to cool the treated solids and prevent dusting. The condensed liquid organic is removed from the site. Depending on its composition, the liquid is either recycled as a supplemental fuel or destroyed in a fixed base incinerator. A thermal desorber removing 500 mg/kg of organic contaminants from 20,000 tons of soil will produce less than 3,000 US gallons (11,000 L) of liquid organic. In essence 20,000 tons of contaminated soil could be reduced to less than one tank truck of extracted liquid residue for off-site disposal.

Desorbers using offgas destruction systems use combustion to thermally destroy the volatilized organics components forming CO, CO_{2}, NOx, SOx and HCl. The destruction unit may be called an afterburner, secondary combustion chamber, or thermal oxidizer. Catalytic oxidizers may also be used if the organic halide content of the contaminated media is low enough. Regardless of the name, the destruction unit is used to thermally destroy the hazardous organic constituents that were removed (volatilized) from the soil or waste.

== See also ==
- In situ thermal desorption
