= Modified active gas sampling =

Modified Active Gas Sampling (MAGS) is an environmental engineering assessment technique which rapidly detects unsaturated soil source areas impacted by volatile organic compounds. The technique was developed by HSA Engineers & Scientists in Fort Myers, Florida in 2002, led by Richard Lewis, Steven Folsom, and Brian Moore. It is being used all over the United States, and has been adopted by the state of Florida in its Dry-cleaning Solvent Cleanup Program.

== Process ==
MAGS involves the extraction and analysis of soil vapor from a piezometer screened through the unsaturated soil column for the purpose of locating unsaturated zone source material. According to the MAGS Manual, written by HSA and adopted by the Florida Department of Environmental Protection, MAGS is performed "by utilizing a typical regenerative blower fitted to a temporary soil vapor extraction well, [such that]a large volume of soil can be assessed with a limited number of samples. While lacking the resolution of traditional soil sampling methods (e.g., discrete soil sampling, low flow active gas sampling, etc.), the statistical representativeness (in the sense of sample coverage) of MAGS results versus traditional methods is much greater. Moreover, the results of the assessment provide useful transport and exposure assessment information over traditional techniques. Lastly, MAGS is effective as both an initial site assessment and remedial assessment tool, in that, MAGS directly yields data required for remedial design."

== Advantages ==
MAGS is an alternative to discrete and composite soil sampling. MAGS, while it does not describe the sample with as much precision as the previously mentioned sampling methods, is more powerful statistically: it represents a larger area of a site which is more useful in determining the presence of a compound. Besides increasing the accuracy in identifying the presence compounds in the soil, MAGS also can quickly and accurately narrow down the location and spread of the compounds after a few trials. Once the location has been determined, more thorough and traditional soil borings can be done in the identified location, instead of sampling a whole site.

HSA found particular success using the technique at solvent-impacted sites that were showing signs of rebound after initial remediation efforts. These rebounds are commonly the result of multiple (relatively small) release areas that had not been previously discovered with discrete soil sampling. MAGS can be useful in detecting how effectively the site had been cleaned up post-remediation.

== Branding ==
HSA Engineers & Scientists considered patenting MAGS technology, but decided to trademark MAGS instead, asking that those who use the technique credit the firm.

== Recognition ==
In 2009, HSA was recognized by the Environmental Business Journal with a Technology Merit Award in the category of remediation for the invention of MAGS technology.
