= Pneumatic fracturing =

Pneumatic fracturing is a method that has become very popular in the last ten years used to remediate contaminated sites. The method consists of injecting gas into a contaminated subsurface at a pressure higher than that of the gases that are present. By doing this fractures "spider-web" throughout the subsurface so that pumps may be placed in the ground to suck out the contaminated water through these cracks. Substrates may also be injected into the soil through the cracks to further the remediation of the soil and ground water. The clean-up technique was developed and patented through the research of various professors at the New Jersey Institute of Technology in 1996 with hopes of cleaning up various United States Environmental Protection Agency (EPA) Superfund sites which are some of the most heavily contaminated sites in the country. The patent is held by John R. Schuring, PhD and PE, professor of civil and environmental engineering at the New Jersey Institute of Technology, developed in conjunction with Thomas M. Boland, Trevor C. King, Sean T. McGonigal, David S. Kosson, Conan D. Fitzgerald, and Sankar Venkatraman. This method has been adopted by environmental contractors all over the country since it has been patented.
