= Soil vapor extraction =

In situ process for soil remediation

Soil vapor extraction (SVE) is a physical treatment process for in situ remediation of volatile contaminants in vadose zone (unsaturated) soils (EPA, 2012). SVE (also referred to as in situ soil venting or vacuum extraction) is based on mass transfer of contaminant from the solid (sorbed) and liquid (aqueous or non-aqueous) phases into the gas phase, with subsequent collection of the gas phase contamination at extraction wells. Extracted contaminant mass in the gas phase (and any condensed liquid phase) is treated in aboveground systems. In essence, SVE is the vadose zone equivalent of the pump-and-treat technology for groundwater remediation. SVE is particularly amenable to contaminants with higher Henry's law constants, including various chlorinated solvents and hydrocarbons. SVE is a well-demonstrated, mature remediation technology and has been identified by the U.S. Environmental Protection Agency (EPA) as presumptive remedy.

== Configuration ==
The soil vapor extraction remediation technology uses vacuum blowers and extraction wells to induce gas flow through the subsurface, collecting contaminated soil vapor, which is subsequently treated aboveground. SVE systems can rely on gas inflow through natural routes or specific wells may be installed for gas inflow (forced or natural). The vacuum extraction of soil gas induces gas flow across a site, increasing the mass transfer driving force from aqueous (soil moisture), non-aqueous (pure phase), and solid (soil) phase into the gas phase. Air flow across a site is thus a key aspect, but soil moisture and subsurface heterogeneity (i.e., a mixture of low and high permeability materials) can result in less gas flow across some zones. In some situations, such as enhancement of monitored natural attenuation, a passive SVE system that relies on barometric pumping may be employed.

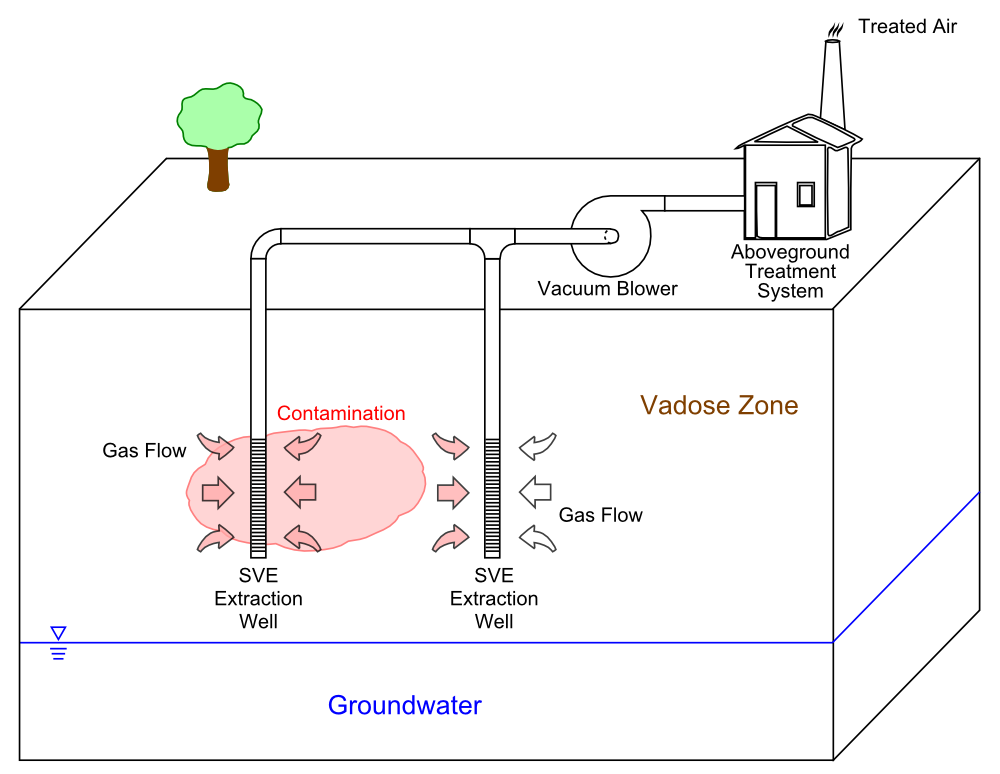
Conceptual diagram of basic soil vapor extraction (SVE) system for vadose zone remediation

SVE has several advantages as a vadose zone remediation technology. The system can be implemented with standard wells and off-the-shelf equipment (blowers, instrumentation, vapor treatment, etc.). SVE can also be implemented with a minimum of site disturbance, primarily involving well installation and minimal aboveground equipment. Depending on the nature of the contamination and the subsurface geology, SVE has the potential to treat large soil volumes at reasonable costs.

The soil gas (vapor) that is extracted by the SVE system generally requires treatment prior to discharge back into the environment. The aboveground treatment is primarily for a gas stream, although condensation of liquid must be managed (and in some cases may specifically be desired). A variety of treatment techniques are available for aboveground treatment and include thermal destruction (e.g., direct flame thermal oxidation, catalytic oxidizers), adsorption (e.g., granular activated carbon, zeolites, polymers), biofiltration, non-thermal plasma destruction, photolytic/photocatalytic destruction, membrane separation, gas absorption, and vapor condensation. The most commonly applied aboveground treatment technologies are thermal oxidation and granular activated carbon adsorption. The selection of a particular aboveground treatment technology depends on the contaminant, concentrations in the offgas, throughput, and economic considerations.

== Effectiveness ==
The effectiveness of SVE, that is, the rate and degree of mass removal, depends on a number of factors that influence the transfer of contaminant mass into the gas phase. The effectiveness of SVE is a function of the contaminant properties (e.g., Henry's law constant, vapor pressure, boiling point, adsorption coefficient), temperature in the subsurface, vadose zone soil properties (e.g., soil grain size, soil moisture content, soil permeability, soil carbon content), subsurface heterogeneity, and the air flow driving force (applied pressure gradient). As an example, a residual quantity of a highly volatile contaminant (such as trichloroethene) in a homogeneous sand with high permeability and low carbon content (i.e., low/negligible adsorption) will be readily treated with SVE. In contrast, a heterogeneous vadose zone with one or more clay layers containing residual naphthalene would require a longer treatment time or SVE enhancements. SVE effectiveness issues include tailing and rebound, which result from contaminated zones with lower air flow (i.e., low permeability zones or zones of high moisture content) or lower volatility (or higher adsorption). Recent work at U.S. Department of Energy sites has investigated layering and low permeability zones in the subsurface and how they affect SVE operations.

== Enhancement ==
Enhancements for improving the effectiveness of SVE can include directional drilling, pneumatic and hydraulic fracturing, and thermal enhancement (e.g., hot air or steam injection). Directional drilling and fracturing enhancements are generally intended to improve the gas flow through the subsurface, especially in lower permeability zones. Thermal enhancements such as hot air or steam injection increase the subsurface soil temperature, thereby improving the volatility of the contamination. In addition, injection of hot (dry) air can remove soil moisture and thus improve the gas permeability of the soil. Additional thermal technologies (such as electrical resistance heating, six-phase soil heating, radio-frequency heating, or thermal conduction heating) can be applied to the subsurface to heat the soil and volatilize/desorb contaminants, but these are generally viewed as separate technologies (versus a SVE enhancement) that may use vacuum extraction (or other methods) for collecting soil gas.

== Design, optimization, performance assessment, and closure ==
On selection as a remedy, implementation of SVE involves the following elements: system design, operation, optimization, performance assessment, and closure. Several guidance documents provide information on these implementation aspects. EPA and U.S. Army Corps of Engineers (USACE) guidance documents establish an overall framework for design, operation, optimization, and closure of a SVE system. The Air Force Center for Engineering and the Environment (AFCEE) guidance presents actions and considerations for SVE system optimization, but has limited information related to approaches for SVE closure and meeting remediation goals. Guidance from the Pacific Northwest National Laboratory (PNNL) supplements these documents by discussing specific actions and decisions related to SVE optimization, transition, and/or closure.

Design and operation of a SVE system is relatively straightforward, with the major uncertainties having to do with subsurface geology/formation characteristics and the location of contamination. As time goes on, it is typical for a SVE system to exhibit a diminishing rate of contaminant extraction due to mass transfer limitations or removal of contaminant mass. Performance assessment is a key aspect to provide input for decisions about whether the system should be optimized, terminated, or transitioned to another technology to replace or augment SVE. Assessment of rebound and mass flux provide approaches to evaluate system performance and obtain information on which to base decisions.

== Related technologies ==
Several technologies are related to soil vapor extraction. As noted above, various soil-heating remediation technologies (e.g., electrical resistive heating, in situ vitrification) require a soil gas collection component, which may take the form of SVE and/or a surface barrier (i.e., hood). Bioventing is a related technology, the goal of which is to introduce additional oxygen (or possibly other reactive gases) into the subsurface to stimulate biological degradation of the contamination. In situ air sparging is a remediation technology for treating contamination in groundwater. Air is injected and "sparged" through the groundwater and then collected via soil vapor extraction wells.

== See also ==
- Bioventing
- Electro Thermal Dynamic Stripping Process
- Environmental remediation
- In situ air sparging
- In situ soil heating
- In-situ thermal desorption
- Modified active gas sampling
- Vapor–liquid separator
- Volatile organic compounds
