= Air sparging =

Air sparging, also known as in situ air stripping and in situ volatilization is an in situ remediation technique, used for the treatment of saturated soils and groundwater contaminated by volatile organic compounds (VOCs) like petroleum hydrocarbons, a widespread problem for the ground water and soil health. Vapor extraction has become a very successful and practical method of VOC remediation. In saturated zone remediation, air sparging refers to the injection of a hydrocarbon-free gaseous medium into the ground where contamination has been found. When it comes to situ air sparging it became an intricate phase process that was proven to be successful in Europe since the 1980s. Currently, there have been further developments into bettering the engineering design and process of air sparging.

== Mechanism ==
Air sparging is a subsurface contaminant remediation technique that involves the injection of pressurized air into contaminated ground water causing hydrocarbons to change state from dissolved to vapor state. The air is then sent to the vacuum extraction systems to remove the contaminants. The extracted air or "off vapors" are treated to remove any toxic contaminants.

== Methods and treatment ==
Soil vapor extraction (SVE) involves the use of multiple air injection points and multiple soil vapor extraction points that can be installed in contaminated soils to extract vapor phase contaminants above the water table. Contamination must be at least 3 feet (0.91 m) deep beneath the ground surface in order for the system to be effective. A blower is attached to wells, usually through a manifold, below the water table creating pressure. The pressurized air forms small bubbles that travel through the contamination in and above water column. The bubbles of air volatilize contaminants and carry them to the unsaturated soils above. Vacuum points are installed in the unsaturated soils above the saturated zone. The vacuum points extract the vapors through to a soil vapor extraction system. In order for the vacuum to avoid pulling the air from the surface, the ground has to be covered with a tarp or other method of sealing out surface air. Surface air intrusion into the system reduces efficiency and can reduce the accuracy of system metrics. The tarp is used to stop vapors from breakthrough to the surface above.

The air sparging system treats the off-gases (referred as contaminated vapors and extracted air). The vapor is treated with granulated activated carbon prior to release to the atmosphere.

== Applicability ==
Air sparging is generally applied for commercial usage. Air sparging contaminant groups are VOCs and fuels found in groundwater. Air sparging is usually applied to the lighter gasoline constituents such as benzene, ethylbenzene, toluene, and xylene. This method is typically not applied on the heavier gasoline products such as kerosene and diesel fuels. The usage of air sparging is commonly applied when cleaning up contaminated water under buildings and obstacles to prevent the further contamination of that water source. The usage of air sparging and SVE is safe when properly conducted. This makes sure only clean air that meets a certain quality standard is released, therefore it does not pose a threat when the proper sample method is done to make sure that hazardous gases do not exit into the atmosphere.

Arsenic-contaminated groundwater can be treated by air sparging to remove a certain percentage of arsenic in a solution of iron and arsenic at a molar ratio of 2. Treatment using air sparging is beneficial as groundwater contains high amounts of dissolved iron, which contains the theoretical capacity for the treatment.
