= Thermal blanket =

A thermal blanket is a device used in thermal desorption to clean soil contamination. The primary function of a thermal blanket is to heat the soil to the boiling point of the contaminants (usually 100 to 325 °C and as high as 900 °C) so that they break down. A vacuum pulls the resulting gas (along with volatilized contaminants) into a separate air cleaner that may use various methods, such as carbon filters and high-heat ovens, to completely destroy the contaminants. Aside from evaporation and volatilization, the contaminants may also be removed from the soil through other mechanisms such as steam distillation, pyrolysis, oxidation, and other chemical reactions.

Due to their placement, the thermal blanket can only be used in shallow areas, which is around 1 meter. The process can take more than 24 hours to treat 6 inches of soil and up to 4 days for contaminated areas with depths of 12 to 18 inches.

Deep contamination (contamination at depths greater than 1 meter) is handled using a similar method but with a deep penetrating heat source. This is commonly referred to as an in situ thermal desorption (ISTD) thermal well and it uses heater elements that consist of nichrome wires in a ceramic insulator. Like the thermal blankets, the heating temperature could reach as high as 900 °C, heating adjacent regions through heat conduction. Vacuum is also applied to withdraw broken contaminants.

== Concerns ==
It is reported that the application of the thermal blanket is limited and this could be attributed to a number of concerns. For example, as a contaminant becomes heated, it may leak outside of the area of the thermal blanket. Therefore, the blanket must completely cover the contaminated area and have a strong enough vacuum to prohibit the spread of contamination. Incomplete destruction of contaminants may also lead to the introduction of dioxins and furans into the air.

The thermal blanket method has not been effectively tested on organic contaminants. The technology is presently commercially available. Shell Technology Ventures, Inc., for instance, has developed its own ISTD thermal blanket solution that can treat or remove contaminants on near-surface soil or pavements without excavation.

== See also ==
- Soil contamination

== Other sources ==
- I. E. T. Iben; W. A. Edelstein; R. B. Sheldon; A. P. Shapiro; E. E. Uzgiris; C. R. Scatena; S. R. Blaha; W. B. Silverstein; G. R. Brown; G. L. Stegemeier & H. J. Vinegar (1985). "Thermal Blanket for In-Situ Remediation of Surficial Contamination: A Pilot Test". Environ. Sci. Technol. 30 (11): 3144–3154. doi:10.1021/es9506622.
