= Pressure grouting =

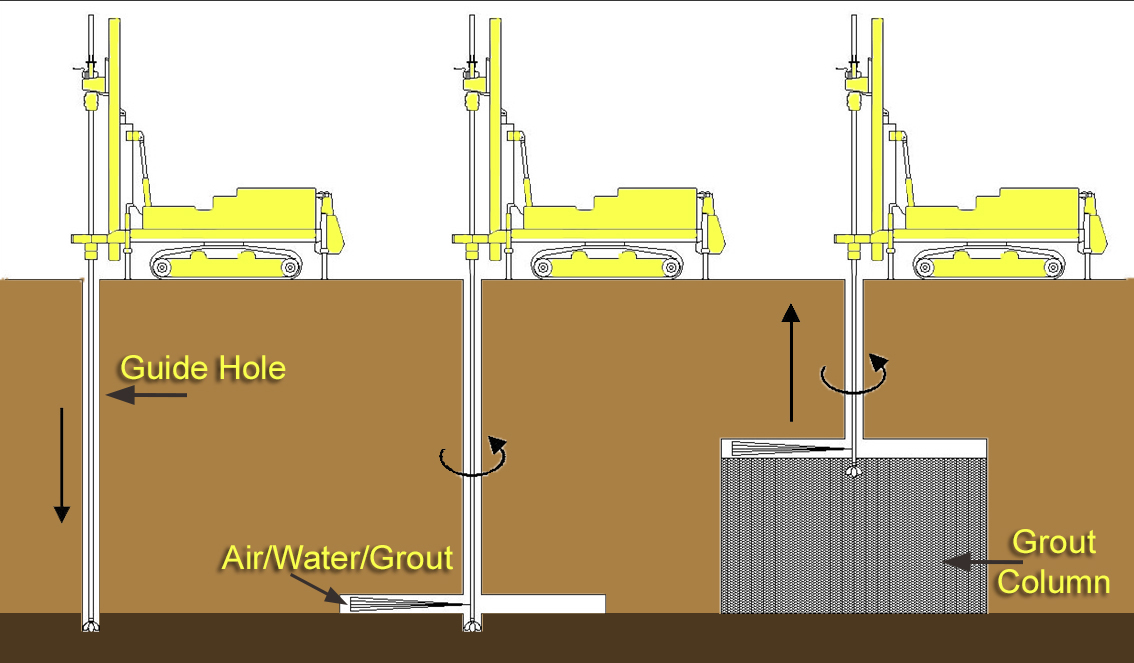

Pressure grouting or jet grouting involves injecting a grout material into otherwise inaccessible but interconnected pore or void space of which neither the configuration or volume are known, and is often referred to simply as grouting.

The grout may be a cementitious, resinous, or solution chemical mixture. Some types of injected grout may not penetrate, and may subsequently shrink and pull away even when coarse sediments have been penetrated. Different grout may be needed for fine grained and coarse grained soils in the grouted area. The greatest use of pressure grouting is to improve geomaterials (soil and rock).

The purpose of grouting can be either to strengthen a formation or to reduce water flow through it. It is also used to correct faults in concrete and masonry structures. In 1986 a study conducted by the Hazardous Waste Engineering Research Laboratory of the US Environmental Protection Agency tested acrylate, Portland cement and different compositions of silicate material to see if the grouting techniques of direct injection or jet grouting could be used to bottom seal hazardous waste sites with an "inert, impermeable and continuous" horizontal barrier. When the US government tested the more modern technique of jet grouting for waste control in 1986 they concluded that "the shape and size could not be controlled with sufficient precision in the loess or silt to produce a continuous barrier when the cavities were grouted".

Since first usage in the 19th century, grouting has been performed on the foundation of virtually every one of the world's large dams, in order to reduce the amount of leakage through the rock, and sometimes to strengthen the foundation to support the weight of the overlying structure, be it of concrete, earth, or rock fill. There are four types of grouting methods used in practice: compaction, chemical (permeation), slurry, and jet grouting. Chemical and slurry are low- pressure, jet and compaction are high pressure. Compaction is a technique that was developed in the United States. Compaction grouting was used in the Bolton Hill subway in Baltimore.

Jet grouting can be used in soils that can not be grouted by traditional methods by reducing inhomogeneities in soil. Generally, application of grouting to waste control is complicated by soil conditions at the site, including the durability of the grout with prolonged exposure to wastes.

It is also a key procedure in the creation of post-tensioned prestressed concrete, a material used in many concrete bridge designs, among other places.
