= ERH (gene) =

Protein-coding gene in the species Homo sapiens

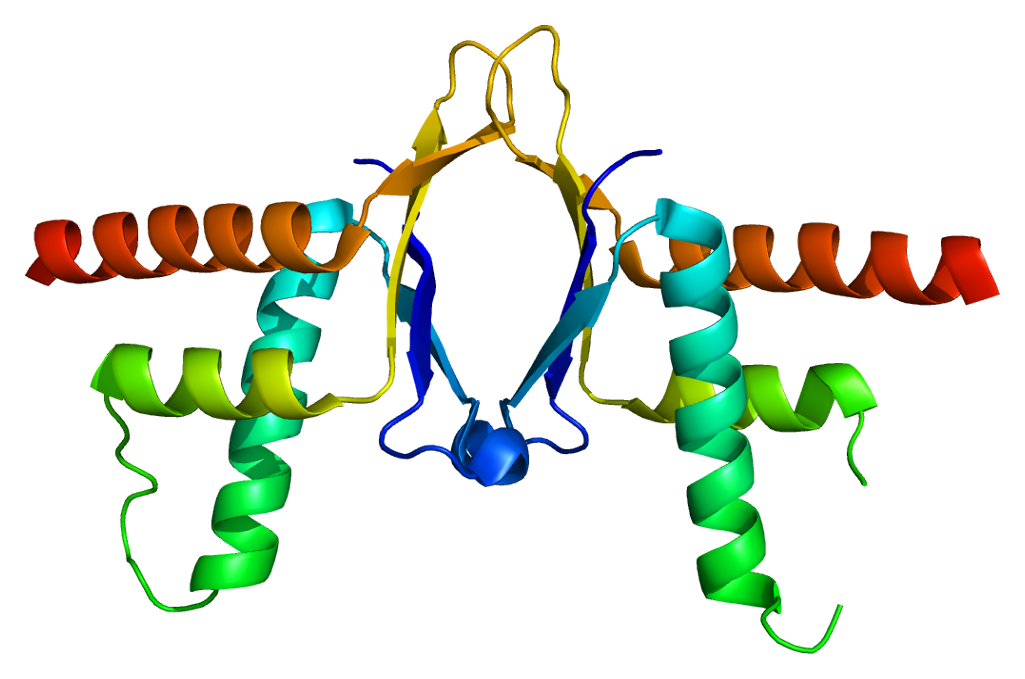

Identifiers
- Aliases: ERH, DROER, enhancer of rudimentary homolog (Drosophila), mRNA splicing and mitosis factor, ERH mRNA splicing and mitosis factor
- External IDs: OMIM: 601191; MGI: 108089; GeneCards: ERH
Available structures
| PDB | Ortholog search: PDBe RCSB |
| PDB | List of PDB id codes 1W9G, 2NML |

Gene location (Human)
| Chr. | Chromosome 14 (human) |
| Band | 14q24.1 | Start | 69,380,128 bp |
| Band | 14q24.1 | End | 69,398,299 bp |

Gene location (Mouse)
| Chr. | Chromosome 12 (mouse) |
| Band | 12|12 C3 | Start | 80,680,796 bp |
| Band | 12|12 C3 | End | 80,691,115 bp |
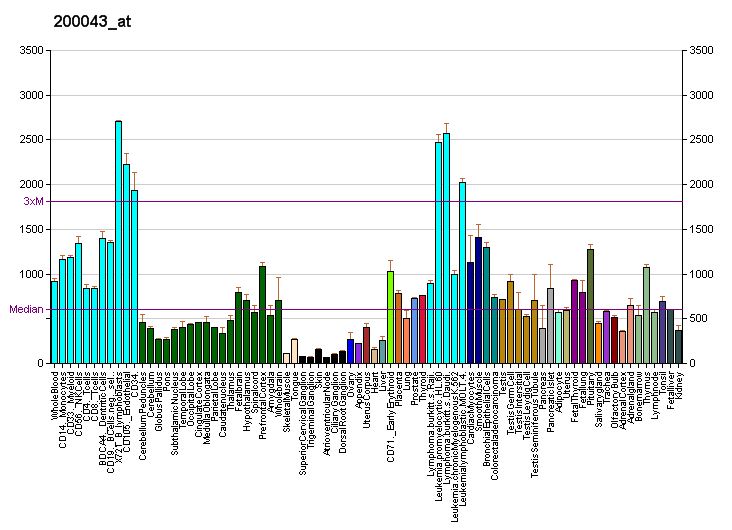
RNA expression pattern
| Bgee | Human / Mouse (ortholog); Top expressed in: seminal vesicula; embryo; ganglionic eminence; ventricular zone; Epithelium of choroid plexus; lactiferous duct; nasal epithelium; renal medulla; caput epididymis; islet of Langerhans / Top expressed in: embryo; yolk sac; ventricular zone; embryo; tail of embryo; morula; blastocyst; zygote; genital tubercle; neural layer of retina; More reference expression data |
| BioGPS | More reference expression data |
Gene ontology
| Molecular function | methyl-CpG binding; protein binding; RNA binding |
| Cellular component | methylosome; midbody |
| Biological process | pyrimidine nucleoside metabolic process; cell cycle; nucleobase-containing compound metabolic process; pyrimidine nucleotide biosynthetic process; positive regulation of Notch signaling pathway |
Sources:Amigo / QuickGO
Orthologs
| Databases | NCBI: entry; OMA: entry |
| Species | Human | Mouse |
| Entrez | 2079 | 13877 |
| Ensembl | ENSG00000100632 | ENSMUSG00000021131 |
| UniProt | P84090 | P84089 |
| RefSeq (mRNA) | NM_004450 | NM_007951; NM_001347409 |
| RefSeq (protein) | NP_004441 | NP_001334338; NP_031977 |
| Location (UCSC) | Chr 14: 69.38 – 69.4 Mb | Chr 12: 80.68 – 80.69 Mb |
| PubMed search |
- Wikidata
| View/Edit Human | View/Edit Mouse |

Enhancer of rudimentary
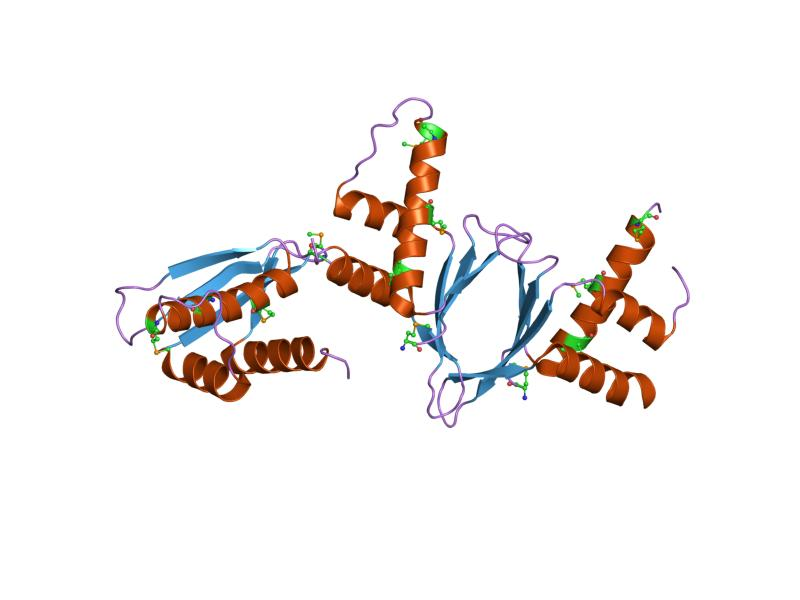
- crystal structure of enhancer of rudimentary homologue (erh)

Identifiers
- Symbol: ER
- Pfam: PF01133
- InterPro: IPR000781
- PROSITE: PDOC00732
- SCOP2: 1j24 / SCOPe / SUPFAM
- TCDB: 3.A.16
Available protein structures:
- PDB: IPR000781 PF01133 (ECOD; PDBsum)
- AlphaFold: IPR000781; PF01133

In molecular biology, Enhancer of rudimentary homolog is a protein that in humans is encoded by the ERH gene.

The Drosophila protein enhancer of rudimentary protein is a small protein of 104 amino acids. It has been found to be an enhancer of the rudimentary gene, involved in pyrimidine biosynthesis.

From an evolutionary point of view, enhancer of rudimentary is highly conserved and has been found to exist in probably all multicellular eukaryotic organisms. It has been proposed that this protein plays a role in the cell cycle.
