= Natural attenuation =

Natural attenuation relies on natural processes to decrease or attenuate concentrations of environmental contaminants in soil and groundwater, as the US EPA describes it. Often it is referred to as monitored natural attenuation, because environmental agencies check soil and water for the contaminant levels over time.

== Mechanisms ==
Natural attenuation occurs through dilution, evaporation, sorption onto soil or plant particles, and biodegradation; it works if only smaller amounts of contaminants are left and the actual source of contaminants was removed.
