= Electrical resistance heating =

Environmental cleanup method

Electrical resistance heating (ERH) is an intensive in situ environmental remediation method that uses the flow of alternating current electricity to heat soil and groundwater and evaporate contaminants. Electric current is passed through a targeted soil volume between subsurface electrode elements. The resistance to electrical flow that exists in the soil causes the formation of heat; resulting in an increase in temperature until the boiling point of water at depth is reached. After reaching this temperature, further energy input causes a phase change, forming steam and removing volatile contaminants. ERH is typically more cost effective when used for treating contaminant source areas.

== Technology ==
Electrical resistance heating is used by the environmental restoration industry for remediation of contaminated soil and groundwater. ERH consists of constructing electrodes in the ground, applying alternating current (AC) electricity to the electrodes and heating the subsurface to temperatures that promote the evaporation of contaminants. Volatilized contaminants are captured by a subsurface vapor recovery system and conveyed to the surface along with recovered air and steam. Similar to soil vapor extraction, the air, steam and volatilized contaminants are then treated at the surface to separate water, air and the contaminants. Treatment of the various streams depends on local regulations and the amount of contaminant.

Some low volatility organic contaminants have a short hydrolysis half-life. For contaminants like these, i.e. 1,1,2,2-Tetrachloroethane and 1,1,1-trichloroethane, hydrolysis can be the primary form of remediation. As the subsurface is heated the hydrolysis half-life of the contaminant will decrease as described by the Arrhenius equation. This results in a rapid degradation of the contaminant. The hydrolysis by-product may be remediated by conventional ERH; however, the majority of the mass of the primary contaminant will not be recovered but rather will degrade to a by-product.

There are predominantly two electrical load arrangements for ERH: three-phase and six-phase. Three-phase heating consists of electrodes in a repeating triangular or delta pattern. Adjacent electrodes are of a different electrical phase so electricity conducts between them as shown in Figure 1. The contaminated area is depicted by the green shape while the electrodes are depicted by the numbered circles.

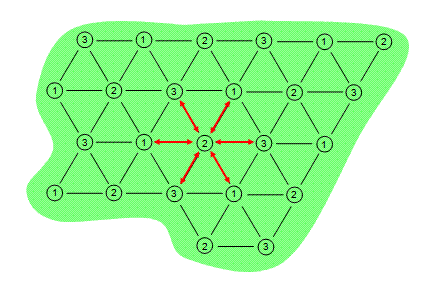
Fig 1. Typical three-phase ERH arrangement

Six-phase heating consists of six electrodes in a hexagonal pattern with a neutral electrode in the center of the array. The six-phase arrays are outlined in blue in Figure 2 below. Once again the contaminated area is depicted by the green shape while the electrodes are depicted by the numbered circles. In a six-phase heating pattern there can be hot spots and cold spots depending on the phases that are next to each other. For this reason, six-phase heating typically works best on small circular areas that are less than 65 feet in diameter.

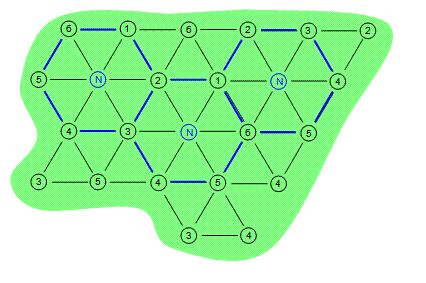
Fig 2. Typical six-phase ERH arrangement

ERH is typically most effective on volatile organic compounds (VOCs). The chlorinated compounds perchloroethylene, trichloroethylene, and cis- or trans- 1,2-dichloroethylene are contaminants that are easily remediated with ERH. The table shows contaminants that can be remediated with ERH along with their respective boiling points. Less volatile contaminants like xylene or diesel can also be remediated with ERH but energy requirements increase as the volatility decreases.

List of compounds that can be remediated with ERH
Chemical	Molecular weight (g)	Boiling point (°C)
1,1,1-trichloroethane	133.4	74
1,1,2-trichloroethane	133.4	114
1,1-dichloroethane	99	57
1,1-dichloroethene	97	32
1,2-dichloroethane	99	84
1,2-dichloropropane	167.9	97
benzene	78.1	80
carbon tetrachloride	153.8	77
chlorobenzene	112.6	132
chloroform	119.4	62
cis-1,2-dichloroethyene	97	60
dibromoethane	187.9	132
ethylbenzene	106.2	136
1,1,2-Trichloro-1,2,2-trifluoroethane	187.4	48
gasoline	100	100
methylene chloride/dichloromethane	84.9	41
4-methyl-2-pentanone/methyl isobutyl ketone	100.2	117
2-methoxy-2-methylpropane/methyl tert-butyl ether	88.1	55
perchloroethylene	165.8	121
trichloroethene	131.5	87
tert-butyl alcohol	74.1	83
toluene	92.1	111
trans-1,2-dichloroethene	97	48
vinyl chloride	62.5	-14
xylene	106.2	140

Electrode spacing and operating time can be adjusted to balance the overall remediation cost with the desired cleanup time. A typical remediation may consist of electrodes spaced 15 to 20 feet apart with operating times usually less than a year. The design and cost of an ERH remediation system depends on a number of factors, primarily the volume of soil/groundwater to be treated, the type of contamination, and the treatment goals. The physical and chemical properties of the target compounds are governed by laws that make heated remediations advantageous over most conventional methods. The electrical energy usage required for heating the subsurface and volatilizing the contaminants can account for 5 to 40% of the overall remediation cost.

There are several laws that govern an ERH remediation. Dalton's law governs the boiling point of a relatively insoluble contaminant. Raoult's law governs the boiling point of mutually soluble co-contaminants and Henry's law governs the ratio of the contaminant in the vapor phase to the contaminant in the liquid phase.

=== Dalton's law ===
For mutually insoluble compounds, Dalton's law states that the partial pressure of a non aqueous phase liquid (NAPL) is equal to its vapor pressure, and that the NAPL in contact with water will boil when the vapor pressure of water plus the vapor pressure of the VOC is equal to ambient pressure. When a VOC-steam bubble is formed the composition of the bubble is proportional to the composite's respective vapor pressures.

=== Raoult's law ===
For mutually soluble compounds, Raoult's law states that the partial pressure of a compound is equal to its vapor pressure times its mole fraction. This means that mutually soluble contaminants will volatilize slower than if there was only one compound present.

=== Henry's law ===
Henry's law describes the tendency of a compound to join air in the vapor phase or dissolve in water. The Henry's law constant, sometimes called coefficient, is specific to each compound and depends on the system temperature. The constant is used to predict the amount of contaminant what will remain in the vapor phase (or transfer to the liquid phase), upon exiting the condenser.

== Recent innovations ==
Significant ERH technological advancements have occurred over the last five years. Three areas of focus have been: bedrock remediation, 1,4-dioxane and other emerging contaminants, and controlled low temperature heat to enhance other remedial or natural processes.

=== Bedrock treatment ===
ERH has been used for over 15 years for treatment of unconsolidated soils in both the vadose and saturated zones. Recent advancements and results show that ERH can be an effective treatment method for bedrock. At an ERH site, the primary electrical current path is on the thin layer of water immediately adjacent to the soil or rock grains. Little current is carried by the water in the pore volume. It is not the pore fluid that dominates the electrical conductivity; it is the grain wetting fluid that dominates the electrical conductivity. Sedimentary rock will typically possess the thin layer of water required for current flow. This means ERH can effectively be used for treatment of sedimentary bedrock, which typically has significant primary porosity.

=== 1,4-dioxane ===
1,4-dioxane is a recently identified contaminant of concern. The regulatory criteria for 1,4-dioxane is constantly changing as more is learned about this contaminant. 1,4-dioxane has a high solubility in water and a low Henry's law constant which combine to present complex challenges associated with remediation. At ambient conditions, the physical properties of 1,4-dioxane indicate air stripping is not an efficient treatment mechanism. Recent ERH remediation results indicate that ERH creates conditions favorable for treatment. ERH remediation involves steam stripping, which historically had not been investigated for 1,4-dioxane. At ERH sites, steam stripping was observed to effectively transfer 1,4-dioxane to the vapor phase for subsequent treatment. 99.8% reductions (or greater) in 1,4-dioxane concentrations in groundwater have been documented on recent ERH remediation. Monitoring of the above grade treatment streams indicates that 95% of 1,4-dioxane remained in the vapor stream after removal from the subsurface. Furthermore, granular activated carbon has proven to be an effective 1,4-dioxane vapor treatment method.

=== Controlled low temperature heating ===
Volatilization is the primary removal mechanism on most ERH sites. However, ERH can also be used to enhance other processes, some naturally occurring, to reduce the cost for treatment of a plume. ERH can be used to provide controlled low temperature heating for projects with remediation processes that do not involve steam stripping. "Low temperature heating" refers to the targeting of a subsurface temperature that is less than the boiling point of water. Examples of low temperature ERH include heat-enhanced bioremediation, heating the subsurface to temperatures above the solubility of dissolved gasses to induce VOC stripping (most notably carbon dioxide ebullition), heat enhanced in situ chemical oxidation (especially for persulfate activation), and heat-enhanced reduction (such as with iron-catalyzed reactions). ERH low-temperature heating can also be used to hydrolyze chlorinated alkanes in-situ at sub-boiling temperatures where hydrochloric acid released during hydrolysis further reacts with subsurface carbonates and bicarbonates to produce carbon dioxide for subsurface stripping of VOCs.

Using low temperature heating coupled with bioremediation, chemical oxidation, or dechlorination will result in increased reaction rates. This can significantly reduce the time required for these remediation processes as compared to a remediation at ambient temperature. In addition, a low temperature option does not require the use of the above grade treatment system for recovered vapors, as boiling temperatures will not be reached. This means less above grade infrastructure and lower overall cost.

When heat is combined with multi-phase extraction, the elevated temperatures will reduce the viscosity and surface tension of the recovered fluids which makes removal faster and easier. This is the original purpose for the development of ERH - to enhance oil recovery (see § History above).

== Weaknesses ==
- Weaknesses of ERH include heat losses on small sites. Treatment volumes that have a large surface area but are thin with respect to depth will have significant heat losses which makes ERH less efficient. The minimum treatment interval for efficient ERH remediation is approximately 10 vertical feet.
- Co-contaminants like oil or grease make remediation more difficult. Oil and grease cause a Raoult's Law effect which requires more energy to remove the contaminants.
- Peat or high organic carbon in the subsurface will preferentially adsorb VOCs due to van der Waals forces. This preferential adsorption will increase the amount of energy required to remove the VOCs from the subsurface.
- Fuel sites are less-commonly treated by ERH because other less-expensive remediation technologies are available and because fuel sites are usually thin (resulting in significant heat losses).
- Sites within landfills are also challenging because metallic debris can distort the electric current paths. ERH is more uniform in natural soil or rock.

== Strengths ==
- ERH is adaptable to all soil types and sedimentary bedrock. ERH is also effective in both the vadose and saturated zones. Certain lithologies can limit traditional methods of remediation by preventing a reliable removal/destruction pathway for the contamination of concern. Because electricity can and does travel through any lithology that contains some water, ERH can be effective in any soil type. By forming buoyant steam bubbles during the heating process, ERH creates a carrier gas that transports the contamination of concern up and out of any soil type. ERH is not capable of desiccating the subsurface. In order for the subsurface to conduct electricity, there must be water present in the subsurface. Conductivity will cease before the subsurface is desiccated.
- ERH is commonly applied under active buildings or manufacturing facilities. Electrodes can be installed above grade within a fenced area or below grade to allow for unrestricted surface access to the treatment area.
- Although principally used for contaminant source areas, ERH can be used to achieve low remedial goals such as maximum contaminant levels, MCLs, for drinking water.
- After ERH treatment, elevated subsurface temperatures will slowly cool over a period of months or years and return to ambient. This period with elevated temperatures is an important part of the remediation process. The elevated temperatures will enhance bioremediation, hydrolysis and iron reductive dehalogenation.
