= In situ thermal desorption =

In situ thermal desorption (or thermal conduction heating) is an advanced soil remediation technology where heat and sometimes vacuum are applied directly to contaminated soil. As the soil is heated to high (up to 900 °C) temperatures, pollutants are vaporized or broken down by steam distillation, oxidation, or pyrolysis. Contaminants are then captured and extracted through a vacuum system. This method is effective in tight soils like clay, efficiently removing pollutants.

Processes can be applied at low (<100 °C), moderate (~100 °C) and higher (>100 °C) temperature levels to accomplish the remediation of a wide variety of contaminants, both above and below the water table, achieving subsurface target treatment temperatures above the boiling point of water.

== History ==
- Developed by Shell Oil Co. in the late 1980s, ISTD/TCH and grew out of enhanced oil recovery research and development.
- During the mid-1990s, Shell Oil Company commercialized ISTD with an investment of over $30 million.

== Method of operation ==
Thermal conductive heating is the application of heat to subsurface soils through conductive heat transfer. The source of the heat is applied via electric or gas powered thermal wells. Thermal wells are inserted vertically, or horizontally, in an array within the soil. Heat flows from the heating elements by conduction. The heating process causes contaminants to be vaporized or destroyed by means of:

1. evaporation
2. steam stripping
3. hydrolysis
4. oxidation
5. pyrolysis

Vaporized contaminants are collected from vapor extraction wells and containerized for removal or recycling.

== See also ==
- Soil vapor extraction
- Thermal blanket
