= Air stripping =

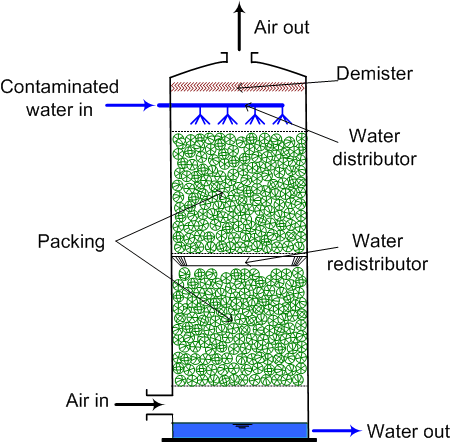
Figure 1. An air stripper

Air stripping is the transferring of volatile components of a liquid into an air stream. It is an environmental engineering technology used for the purification of groundwaters and wastewaters containing volatile compounds.

Volatile compounds have relatively high vapor pressure and low aqueous solubility characterized by the compound's Henry's law coefficient, which is the ratio of the concentration in air that is in equilibrium with its concentration in water. Pollutants with relatively high Henry's Law coefficients can be economically stripped from water. These include BTEX compounds (benzene, toluene, ethylbenzene, and xylene found in gasoline), and solvents including trichloroethylene and tetrachloroethylene. Ammonia can also be stripped from wastewaters and liquid digestates (often requiring pH adjustment prior to stripping). Since Henry's law coefficient increases with temperature, stripping is easier at warmer temperatures.

== Air strippers ==
Although any device that promotes contact between air and water strips some volatile compounds, air strippers are usually packed towers or tray towers operated with countercurrent flow of water and air. The countercurrent flow removes particles from the water and into the air. This process is known as volatization or air stripping. Water is deposited into the system through the top and air is ventilated in through the bottom. Water that reaches the bottom of the system is typically considered treated, but additional testing may be done to determine if it is safe for consumption. Since many of the compounds stripped are hazardous air pollutants, the air exiting a stripper may require emissions control. Carbon adsorption is often used and catalytic oxidation is another option. There are mainly two different types of air strippers: Packed tower systems and sieve tray systems. Different types of air strippers are used depending on the type and amount of contaminants found in the water source being extracted.

=== Packed Tower Strippers ===
Packed towers, such as shown in Figure 1, use a distributor placed at the top of the tower to evenly distribute engineered plastic, ceramic, or metal packing to maximize air-water contact. Design criteria for packed towers include surface area provided by the packing, column height and diameter, and air to water flow rates. Designers of air strippers want to obtain the largest air-water surface contact in order to reach maximum efficiency of removing contaminants Of the two types of air strippers, packed strippers tend to be more efficient at removing contaminants than sieve tray towers. Packed towers remove 99% of volatile organic compounds due to their high Henry's constant and the high air-water surface contact of the system. Packed strippers also work more efficiently in removing lower volatility organic compounds than tray strippers. Furthermore, packed tower strippers are more cost effective than tray strippers when treating larger quantities of water. Towers can be between 5 and 12 meters in height and are typically permanent installations. Though, some towers can be transported on a movable trailer to be used in different areas where water treatment is needed.

=== Tray Tower Strippers ===
Sieve tray towers use a similar process to packed towers, but instead of packed materials being evenly distributed, the materials are separated into several trays with holes that allow water to drip through them. An electric air compressor is typically positioned at the bottom of the system where the air from the fans travels through the holes and becomes exposed to the water. A natural draft can also be used as an air source to separate contaminants from the water. A natural draft is used for removing more volatile substances such as hydrogen sulfide, radon, or vinyl chloride. On the other hand, mechanical air compressors are used to remove less volatile substances.

== Duration of Time Required for Treatment ==
The amount of time it takes for water to be filtered through air stripping can vary from system to system depending on the size of the tank or how quickly water can flow through the device. The typical amount of time water takes to be filtered is around a few minutes. Though, other studies suggest that it can take far longer depending on the type of and concentration of substance. For instance, higher levels of NH3-N, a common contaminant in ground water, can take several hours of air stripping in order to be properly removed from water. In a recent study, it took 4 hours to for the air stripper to reach an equilibrium of efficiency in removing NH3-N elements, topping off at an 81.9% removal rate. Comparatively, only 30.7% of NH3-N elements were removed at 10 minutes, suggesting that removal of contaminants of water correlates with the amount of time spent air stripping.

== See also ==
- Continuous distillation
- Fractionating column
- Steam distillation
- Theoretical plate
