= List of Superfund sites in California =

A map of Superfund sites in California.

This is a list of Superfund sites in California designated under the Comprehensive Environmental Response, Compensation, and Liability Act (CERCLA) environmental law. The CERCLA federal law of 1980 authorized the United States Environmental Protection Agency (EPA) to create a list of polluted locations requiring a long-term response to clean up hazardous material contaminations.

These locations are known as Superfund sites and are placed on the National Priorities List (NPL). The NPL guides the EPA in "determining which sites warrant further investigation" for environmental remediation. As of March 10, 2011, there were 94 Superfund sites on the National Priorities List in California. Three additional sites have been proposed for entry on the list. Twelve sites have been cleaned up and removed from the list. One site was proposed for entry and then removed.

== Superfund sites ==
Proposed for addition to National Priorities List
Deleted from National Priorities List
Removed proposal for addition to National Priorities List

CERCLIS ID	Name	County	Reason	Proposed	Listed	Construction completed	Partially deleted	Deleted
CA0001576081	AMCO Chemical	Alameda	Groundwater, soil, and soil gas are contaminated with chlorinated solvents and other contaminants including vinyl chloride.	04/30/2003	09/29/2003	N/A	N/A	N/A
CA2170023236	Alameda Naval Air Station	Alameda		05/10/1999	07/22/1999	N/A	N/A	N/A
CA2890012584	Lawrence Livermore National Laboratory (USDOE)	Alameda		10/15/1984	07/22/1987	08/10/2007	N/A	N/A
CA2890090002	Lawrence Livermore Lab Site 300 (USDOE)	Alameda and San Joaquin		07/14/1989	08/30/1990	N/A	N/A	N/A
CAD980673685	Leviathan Mine	Alpine		10/22/1999	05/11/2000	N/A	N/A	N/A
CAD009112087	Koppers Co., Inc. (Oroville Plant)	Butte		09/08/1983	09/21/1984	09/04/2003	N/A	N/A
CAD065021594	Louisiana-Pacific Corp.	Butte		10/15/1984	06/10/1986	10/01/1995	N/A	11/21/1996
CAD980894679	Western Pacific Railroad Co.	Butte		10/26/1989	08/30/1990	03/31/1999	N/A	08/29/2001
CA7170024528	Concord Naval Weapons Station	Contra Costa		06/24/1988	12/16/1994	N/A	N/A	N/A
CAD980498562	GBF, Inc., Dump	Contra Costa		06/24/1988	N/A	N/A	N/A	N/A
CAT000646208	Liquid Gold Oil Corp.	Contra Costa		12/30/1982	09/08/1983	09/27/1995	N/A	09/11/1996
CAD981436363	United Heckathorn Co.	Contra Costa		10/26/1989	03/14/1990	N/A	N/A	N/A
CAD000626176	Del Norte Pesticide Storage	Del Norte		09/08/1983	09/21/1984	06/18/1992	N/A	09/18/2002
CAD980496863	Atlas Asbestos Mine	Fresno		09/08/1983	09/21/1984	09/02/1999	N/A	N/A
CAD980817217	Coalinga Asbestos Mine	Fresno		09/08/1983	09/21/1984	03/14/1995	N/A	04/24/1998
CAD980636914	Fresno Municipal Sanitary Landfill	Fresno		06/24/1988	10/04/1989	N/A	N/A	N/A
CAD980736284	Industrial Waste Processing	Fresno		10/26/1989	08/30/1990	09/28/1999	N/A	N/A
CAD980736151	Purity Oil Sales, Inc.	Fresno		12/30/1982	09/08/1983	N/A	N/A	N/A
CAD029452141	Selma Treating Co.	Fresno		12/30/1982	09/08/1983	01/26/2005	N/A	N/A
CAD009106220	T.H. Agriculture & Nutrition Co.	Fresno		10/15/1984	06/10/1986	06/24/2004	N/A	08/21/2006
CAD980638860	Celtor Chemical Works	Humboldt		12/30/1982	09/08/1983	09/29/1989	N/A	09/30/2003
CAD066635442	Stoker Company	Imperial		07/29/1991	N/A	N/A	N/A	N/A
CAD052384021	Brown & Bryant, Inc. (Arvin Plant)	Kern		06/24/1988	10/04/1989	N/A	N/A	N/A
CA1570024504	Edwards Air Force Base	Kern, San Bernardino, and Los Angeles		07/14/1989	08/30/1990	N/A	N/A	N/A
CAD980893275	Sulphur Bank Mercury Mine	Lake		06/24/1988	08/30/1990	N/A	N/A	N/A
CAD055753370	Cooper Drum Company	Los Angeles		02/07/1992	06/14/2001	N/A	N/A	N/A
CAD029544731	Del Amo	Los Angeles		07/29/1991	09/25/1997	N/A	N/A	N/A
CA9800013030	Jet Propulsion Laboratory (NASA)	Los Angeles		02/07/1992	10/14/1992	N/A	N/A	N/A
CAD008242711	Chemical dumps in ocean off Southern California, Montrose Chemical Corp.	Los Angeles		10/15/1984	10/04/1989	N/A	N/A	N/A
CAD042245001	Omega Chemical Corporation	Los Angeles		09/29/1998	01/19/1999	N/A	N/A	N/A
CAT080012024	Operating Industries, Inc., Landfill	Los Angeles		10/15/1984	06/10/1986	N/A	N/A	N/A
CAD980737092	Pemaco Maywood	Los Angeles		07/28/1998	01/19/1999	09/25/2007	N/A	N/A
CAD980894893	San Fernando Valley (Area 1)	Los Angeles		10/15/1984	06/10/1986	N/A	N/A	N/A
CAD980894901	San Fernando Valley (Area 2)	Los Angeles		10/15/1984	06/10/1986	N/A	N/A	N/A
CAD980894984	San Fernando Valley (Area 3)	Los Angeles		10/15/1984	06/10/1986	05/20/2004	N/A	10/12/2004
CAD980894976	San Fernando Valley (Area 4)	Los Angeles		10/15/1984	06/10/1986	N/A	N/A	N/A
CAD980677355	San Gabriel Valley (Area 1)	Los Angeles		09/08/1983	05/08/1984	N/A	N/A	N/A
CAD980818512	San Gabriel Valley (Area 2)	Los Angeles		09/08/1983	05/08/1984	N/A	N/A	N/A
CAD980818579	San Gabriel Valley (Area 3)	Los Angeles		09/08/1983	05/08/1984	N/A	N/A	N/A
CAD980817985	San Gabriel Valley (Area 4)	Los Angeles		09/08/1983	05/08/1984	N/A	N/A	N/A
CAD980884357	Waste Disposal, Inc.	Los Angeles		06/10/1986	07/22/1987	08/12/2005	N/A	N/A
CAD063015887	Coast Wood Preserving	Mendocino		12/30/1982	09/08/1983	N/A	N/A	N/A
CA3570024551	Castle Air Force Base (6 Areas)	Merced		10/15/1984	07/22/1987	09/21/2006	N/A	N/A
CAD980498455	Crazy Horse Sanitary Landfill	Monterey		06/24/1988	08/30/1990	N/A	N/A	N/A
CAD990793887	Firestone Tire & Rubber Company (Salinas Plant)	Monterey		10/15/1984	07/22/1987	12/24/1991	N/A	04/21/2005
CA7210020676	Fort Ord	Monterey		07/14/1989	02/21/1990	N/A	N/A	N/A
CAD983618893	Lava Cap Mine	Nevada		09/29/1998	01/19/1999	N/A	N/A	N/A
CA6170023208	El Toro Marine Corps Air Station	Orange		06/24/1988	02/21/1990	N/A	N/A	N/A
CAD980498695	McColl	Orange	200,000 cubic yards of oil refinery acid sludge and oil field drilling muds, including sulfur and hydrocarbons. The wastes have reacted to produce a mixture of complex organic and sulfur-containing compounds, some of which are gases.	12/30/1982	09/08/1983	06/30/1998	N/A	N/A
CAD981995947	Ralph Gray Trucking Co.	Orange		07/29/1991	10/14/1992	08/31/2000	N/A	09/28/2004
CAD098229214	Alark Hard Chrome	Riverside		07/27/2000	12/01/2000	N/A	N/A	N/A
CA4570024527	March Air Force Base	Riverside		07/14/1989	11/21/1989	N/A	N/A	N/A
CAT080012826	Stringfellow Acid Pits	Riverside		12/30/1982	09/08/1983	N/A	N/A	N/A
CAD980358832	Aerojet General Corp.	Sacramento		12/30/1982	09/08/1983	N/A	N/A	N/A
CAD980737613	Jibboom Junkyard	Sacramento		12/30/1982	09/08/1983	03/31/1988	N/A	09/10/1991
CA8570024143	Mather Air Force Base (Aircraft Control and Warning Disposal Site)	Sacramento		10/15/1984	07/22/1987	09/29/2009	N/A	N/A
CA4570024337	McClellan Air Force Base (Groundwater Contamination)	Sacramento		10/15/1984	07/22/1987	N/A	N/A	N/A
CA0210020780	Sacramento Army Depot	Sacramento		10/15/1984	07/22/1987	08/28/2002	–	–
CA0001900463	New Idria Mercury Mine	San Benito		03/10/2011	–	–	–	–
CAN000905945	B.F. Goodrich	San Bernardino		09/03/2008	09/23/2009	–	–	–
CA8170024261	Barstow Marine Corps Logistics Base	San Bernardino		07/14/1989	11/21/1989	N/A	N/A	N/A
CA2570024453	George Air Force Base	San Bernardino		07/14/1989	02/21/1990	N/A	N/A	N/A
CAD981434517	Newmark Ground Water Contamination	San Bernardino		06/24/1988	03/31/1989	N/A	N/A	N/A
CA4570024345	Norton Air Force Base (Landfill #2)	San Bernardino		10/15/1984	07/22/1987	05/16/2006	N/A	N/A
CA2170023533	Camp Pendleton Marine Corps Base	San Diego		07/14/1989	11/21/1989	N/A	N/A	N/A
CA1170090087	Treasure Island Naval Station-Hunters Point Annex	San Francisco		07/14/1989	11/21/1989	N/A	04/05/1999	N/A
CAD009106527	McCormick & Baxter Creosoting Co.	San Joaquin		02/07/1992	10/14/1992	N/A	N/A	N/A
CA8210020832	Sharpe Army Depot	San Joaquin		10/15/1984	07/22/1987	06/27/2003	N/A	N/A
CA4971520834	Tracy Defense Depot (USARMY)	San Joaquin		07/14/1989	08/30/1990	N/A	N/A	N/A
CA1141190578	Klau/Buena Vista Mine	San Luis Obispo		09/23/2004	04/19/2006	N/A	N/A	N/A
CAD020748125	Casmalia Resources	Santa Barbara		06/14/2001	09/13/2001	N/A	N/A	N/A
CAD048634059	Advanced Micro Devices, Inc.	Santa Clara		10/15/1984	06/10/1986	09/17/1993	N/A	N/A
CAT080034234	Advanced Micro Devices, Inc. (Bldg. 915)	Santa Clara		06/24/1988	08/30/1990	03/25/1992	N/A	N/A
CAD042728840	Applied Materials	Santa Clara		10/15/1984	07/22/1987	09/27/1993	N/A	N/A
CAD009212838	CTS Printex, Inc.	Santa Clara		06/24/1988	02/21/1990	03/31/1992	N/A	N/A
CAD095989778	Fairchild Semiconductor Corp. (Mountain View Plant)	Santa Clara		10/15/1984	02/11/1991	08/24/1999	N/A	N/A
CAD097012298	Fairchild Semiconductor Corp. (South San Jose Plant)	Santa Clara		10/15/1984	10/04/1989	03/25/1992	N/A	N/A
CAD980884209	Hewlett-Packard (620-640 Page Mill Road)	Santa Clara		06/24/1988	02/21/1990	09/16/1997	N/A	N/A
CAD061620217	Intel Corp. (Mountain View Plant)	Santa Clara		10/15/1984	06/10/1986	08/24/1999	N/A	N/A
CAT000612184	Intel Corp. (Santa Clara III)	Santa Clara		10/15/1984	06/10/1986	08/18/1992	N/A	N/A
CAD092212497	Intel Magnetics	Santa Clara		10/15/1984	06/10/1986	08/19/1992	N/A	N/A
CAD041472341	Intersil Inc./Siemens Components	Santa Clara		06/24/1988	08/30/1990	09/08/1992	N/A	N/A
CAD009103318	Jasco Chemical Corp.	Santa Clara		06/24/1988	10/04/1989	09/20/2002	N/A	N/A
CAD029295706	Lorentz Barrel & Drum Co.	Santa Clara		10/15/1984	10/04/1989	09/29/1998	N/A	N/A
CA2170090078	Naval Air Station Moffett	Santa Clara		04/10/1985	07/22/1987	N/A	N/A	N/A
CAD049236201	Monolithic Memories	Santa Clara		10/15/1984	07/22/1987	08/22/1994	N/A	N/A
CAD041472986	National Semiconductor Corp.	Santa Clara		10/15/1984	07/22/1987	10/16/1997	N/A	N/A
CAD009205097	Raytheon Corp.	Santa Clara		10/15/1984	06/10/1986	08/24/1999	N/A	N/A
CAD980894885	South Bay Asbestos Area	Santa Clara		10/15/1984	06/10/1986	09/23/1998	N/A	N/A
CAD009138488	Spectra-Physics, Inc.	Santa Clara		06/24/1988	02/11/1991	09/16/1992	N/A	N/A
CAD990832735	Synertek, Inc. (Building 1)	Santa Clara		06/24/1988	10/04/1989	03/25/1992	N/A	N/A
CAD009159088	TRW Microwave, Inc. (Building 825)	Santa Clara		06/24/1988	02/21/1990	09/17/1993	N/A	N/A
CAD009111444	Teledyne Semiconductor	Santa Clara		10/15/1984	07/22/1987	03/31/1992	N/A	N/A
CAD001864081	Westinghouse Electric Corp. (Sunnyvale Plant)	Santa Clara		10/15/1984	06/10/1986	09/27/2000	N/A	N/A
CAD980893234	Watkins-Johnson Co. (Stewart Division Plant)	Santa Cruz		01/22/1987	08/30/1990	09/22/1994	N/A	N/A
CAD980498612	Iron Mountain Mine	Shasta	Surface water is contaminated with sulfuric acid, copper, zinc, and cadmium from the mine.	12/30/1982	09/08/1983	N/A	N/A	N/A
CAN000906063	Blue Ledge Mine	Siskiyou		03/10/2011	–	–	–	–
CAD000625731	J.H. Baxter & Co.	Siskiyou		10/15/1984	10/04/1989	09/14/2001	N/A	N/A
CA2890190000	Laboratory for Energy-Related Health Research/Old Campus Landfill (USDOE)	Solano^{[a]}	Groundwater and soil contaminated with solvents, chemical wastes, and radioactive wastes.	01/18/1994	05/31/1994	N/A	N/A	N/A
CA5570024575	Travis Air Force Base	Solano		07/14/1989	11/21/1989	N/A	N/A	N/A
CAD000074120	MGM Brakes	Sonoma		12/30/1982	09/08/1983	09/09/1994	N/A	N/A
CAD981171523	Sola Optical USA, Inc.	Sonoma		06/24/1988	02/21/1990	08/14/1992	N/A	N/A
CAD981997752	Modesto Ground Water Contamination	Stanislaus		06/24/1988	03/31/1989	N/A	N/A	N/A
CA7210020759	Riverbank Army Ammunition Plant	Stanislaus		06/24/1988	02/21/1990	09/30/1997	N/A	N/A
CAD063020143	Valley Wood Preserving, Inc.	Stanislaus		06/24/1988	03/31/1989	08/21/2008	N/A	N/A
CAD048645444	Beckman Instruments (Porterville Plant)	Tulare		10/15/1984	06/10/1986	09/21/1993	N/A	N/A
CAD980816466	Southern California Edison Co. (Visalia Poleyard)	Tulare		01/22/1987	03/31/1989	09/25/2001	N/A	09/25/2009
CAD009688052	Halaco Engineering Co.	Ventura	Contamination found on site includes a combination of several metals and radionuclides significantly above background. These contaminants include aluminum, arsenic, barium, beryllium, cadmium, chromium, copper, lead, magnesium, manganese, nickel, silver, zinc, cesium-137, potassium-40, thorium-228, thorium-230, and thorium-232.	03/07/2007	09/19/2007	N/A	N/A	N/A
CAD980636781	Pacific Coast Pipe Lines (Texaco)	Ventura	Liquid and semisolid refinery wastes were dumped in unlined pits and sumps. Soil contains benzene, 1,3-dichlorobenzene, and lead.	06/24/1988	10/04/1989	09/27/1996	N/A	N/A
CAD071530380	Frontier Fertilizer	Yolo		01/18/1994	05/31/1994	N/A	N/A	N/A

== Note ==
^a While the site locates in Solano county according to California's official county border line, it is still considered as part of the University of California, Davis.

== See also ==
- Hazardous Waste and Substances Sites List
- Pollution in California
- List of Superfund sites in the United States
- List of environmental issues
- List of waste types
- TOXMAP
