= Environmental issues in the San Joaquin Valley =

The San Joaquin Valley of California has seen environmental issues arise from agricultural production, industrial processing, and the region's use as a transportation corridor, experiencing some of the nation’s worst air quality, high rates of childhood asthma, and contaminated drinking water.

Geographically, the San Joaquin Valley stretches from the Tehachapi Mountains in the south, between the California coastal ranges and the Sierra Nevada range, and opening into Sacramento–San Joaquin River Delta in the north. Much of the large, flat land area is devoted to large-scale agricultural production, although there are some significant urban centers such Fresno, Bakersfield, Clovis, Stockton, Modesto, and Visalia. It provides a transportation connection between populous northern California and southern California via I-5 and CA-99.

The United States Environmental Protection Agency (EPA) is the federal organization dedicated to protecting human health and the environment, and is often referenced as the primary regulator for environmental challenges. The EPA performs actions related to developing and enforcing regulations, giving grants, sponsoring partnerships, studying environmental issues, promoting environmental education, and publishing environmental health information.

== Water pollution ==
=== Surface water pollution ===
The San Joaquin River and its tributaries form the San Joaquin River watershed which spans the entire valley. The water quality in the San Joaquin River is degraded due to runoff from irrigated agriculture, other agricultural activities (such as dairies and feed lots), municipalities. Elevated levels of selenium, fluoride and nitrates have been measured in the river and its tributaries. The selenium is believed to originate from soils on the west side of the valley and in the Coast Ranges, which are rich with the element. Additionally, the San Joaquin is suffering chronic salinity problems due to high levels of minerals being washed off the land by irrigation practices. The San Joaquin Valley Surface water storage and diversions such as the Friant Dam on the San Joaquin River reduce winter flooding and summer salinity of the Sacramento-San Joaquin Delta.

Abandoned mines contribute toxic acid mine drainage to some tributaries of the river. Two examples exist near Coalinga, named the Atlas Asbestos Mine and the New Idria Mercury Mine, both of which is listed as superfund sites. The Fresno Municipal Sanitary Landfill is also a superfund site and has been in the process of being cleaned up for 30 years.

The events at Kesterson Reservoir in the 1980s are an example of toxic levels of minerals in the San Joaquin Valley. Initially, animals and plants thrived in the artificial wetlands that were created there, but in 1983, it was found that birds had suffered severe deformities and deaths due to steadily increasing levels of chemicals and toxins. In the next few years, all the fish species died except for the mosquito fish, and algae blooms proliferated in the contaminated water.

=== Groundwater pollution ===
In 1972, the California Department of Public Health commended the city of Fresno for its efforts to mitigate nitrates in the groundwater supply. However, in 2001, Fresno earned a grade of poor for water quality and compliance from the Natural Resources Defense Council, an environmental advocacy group. Groundwater in Fresno is unconfined and is susceptible to contamination from agriculture, runoff, and seeping contaminants. The city treats and tests the water it extracts from the ground to ensure it meets drinking water standards. Local agencies, including the cities of Fresno and Clovis, use rain water and other surface water to recharge the aquifers.

Starting in 2016, some residents in Northeast Fresno complained of "red-, brown- or yellow-tinged water" in their homes, which sparked concerns about the water being unsafe for consumption. Comparisons were made to the Flint water crisis, which was happening concurrently and in the news. Two water supply experts named Marc Edwards and Vernon Snoeyink were retained to investigate and they determined that compared to Flint, "you don't have nearly the same problem (in Fresno)" and that the water complied with EPA pollution thresholds. Some affected residents sued the city based on the discolored water event starting in 2016 alleging harm due to "exposure to excessive levels of lead and other toxic substances" as well as harm due to "diminution of their property value and...the cost of re-plumbing their home". The separate cases were bundled into a class action lawsuit in 2021 but a judge dismissed it the following year.

== Air pollution ==
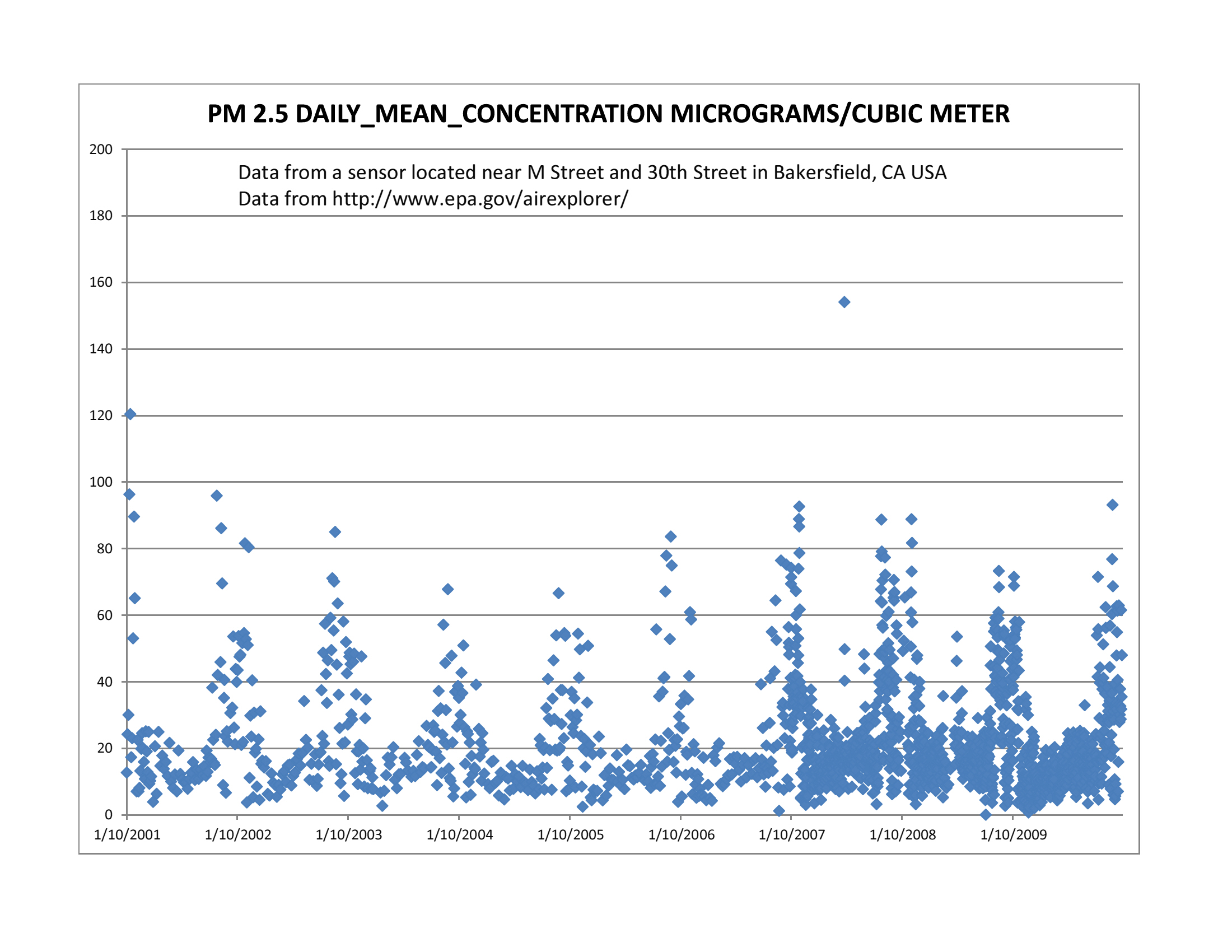
A graph of PM 2.5 concentration vs time in Bakersfield, CA. There is a seasonal variation of pollution with time

Smog (measured as Ozone) and particulate matter (measured as PM_{2.5}) levels are very high in the San Joaquin Valley. In its 2022 survey, the American Lung Association ranked three valley metro areas as having the nation's worst short-term and year-round PM_{2.5} levels and only the Los Angeles metro area was ranked as having worse smog.

The unique geography of the valley exacerbates the air quality problem. Residents on the valley floor are surrounded by mountain ranges between the Sierra Nevada and the Coast, acting as a pool for toxic concentrations to build up.

The pollution leads to a high prevalence of asthma in the San Joaquin Valley, disproportionately affecting school-age children. Asthma is responsible for approximately 808,000 absences within the region, accounting for at least $26 million in lost revenue to regional school districts.

=== Regulatory history ===
The Clean Air Act (CAA) is the comprehensive federal law that regulates air emissions from stationary and mobile sources, establishing National Ambient Air Quality Standards (NAAQS) to protect public health and public welfare and to regulate emissions of hazardous air pollutants.

The San Joaquin Valley Air Pollution Control District is the primary regulator for the region and has taken various actions to improve air quality and meet the standards of the CAA. The District adopted a PM_{10} Attainment Demonstration Plan in 2006, an Ozone Attainment Demonstration Plan in 2007 and a PM_{2.5} Attainment Demonstration Plan in 2008. Previously, to meet California Clean Air Act requirements, the district adopted an Air Quality Attainment Plan in 1991 and then issued updates to address the California ozone standard.

Alongside the San Joaquin Valley Air Pollution Control District, individual organizations like the Central California Asthma Collaborative (CCAC) aim to regulate San Joaquin Valley air pollution and its health effects. CCAC is a nonprofit organization founded in 2011 to improve health and address inequities regarding asthma and its environmental facets. Asthma programs initiated by the organization include conducting home visits to help low-income families reduce indoor environmental triggers and properly use preventative medications. Office locations in Fresno, Bakersfield, and Modesto provide services to seven counties of the San Joaquin Valley.

Each year, measured levels of ozone and PM_{2.5} in the San Joaquin Valley are higher than the National Ambient Air Quality Standards established by the EPA. The PM_{2.5} violations typically occur in the winter months and span about 51 days. Amidst the violations, many argue that the EPA has taken minimal action on the recurring problem, leading to lawsuits.

=== Effects on Respiratory Health ===
The air quality of the San Joaquin Valley is strongly associated with rates of asthma symptoms and asthma-related emergency visits and hospitalizations. Residents of the San Joaquin Valley are more likely to experience daily or weekly asthma symptoms for ozone, PM_{10}, and PM_{2.5}. Concentrations of ozone, PM_{10}, and PM_{2.5} are similarly associated with asthma-related ED visits or hospitalizations. Increased ambient PM_{2.5} specifically exacerbates wheezing and dyspnea asthma symptoms. Where PM_{2.5} violations typically occur in winter months and span about 51 days, asthma symptoms and airway function are significantly impaired.

The Asthma and Allergy Foundation of America’s annual Asthma Capitals report points out the San Joaquin Valley as a region of frequently high-ranking cities as Asthma Capitals. The 2024 Asthma Capitals report ranks Fresno as 11, Stockton as 35, and Bakersfield as 78 out of the top 100 asthma-prevalent cities throughout the United States according to health outcomes in asthma prevalence, emergency department visits for asthma, and deaths due to asthma.

Symptoms of asthma may include shortness of breath, cough, chest tightness, and wheezing. Though the effects of air pollution on San Joaquin Valley's respiratory health influence various demographics, the effects disproportionately influence children and especially children of farmworkers. Industrial farming conditions expose children to environmental concerns that include pesticide exposure, bovine contamination, agricultural field burning, and substandard housing. However, as asthma is not a reportable public health condition, surveillance is difficult and limited to survey information.

=== Sources ===
The sources of air pollutants vary and are still being researched. The ozone is believed to come from vehicles, agricultural operations, and industry, while PM_{2.5} is believed to come from vehicles, power generation, industrial processes, wood burning, road and farming activities, and wildfires. Some pollutants drift down from the Bay Area and Sacramento, including oxides of nitrogen.

Burning of agricultural waste from orchards and vineyards has been a focus for regulators. The local air district's policy on agricultural burns is noted as one of the strictest in the nation, only allowing agricultural burns on good air quality days. Most burning happens after the harvest, between late fall and spring.

== Natural disasters ==
=== Drought ===
The San Joaquin Valley is susceptible to acute periods of drought. Since water is essential to crop production, any water shortage takes a huge toll on farmers in the valley. According to the California Department of Water Resources, in 2016, nine of the twelve biggest reservoirs in California are below the historical average, even after the El Nino in the winter of 2015. In the last five years, Fresno has received significantly less rainfall than the historical average of 14.77 inches per year, with the average since 2011 being 7.76 inches per year. This means that Fresno has only been getting about half of the rain that it normally does, creating problems from which it may take several years of heavy rain to recover.

One obvious cause of the drought is the lack of rainfall. With significantly less rainfall than usual, small rivers have been drying up, and less water is available to farmers for their crops. Only two of the last eleven years have reached Fresno's 14.77 inch per year average, so the current drought has intensified. Several seasonal rivers and streams dependent on water releases from California's vast dam system have been dry for several years. Releasing billions of gallons of water in the spring leaves the reservoirs depleted in the hotter and drier months of the year. This is necessary to leave room for snowmelt to fill the lakes, or the reservoirs could potentially flood after heavy rainfall or unseasonable warmth. Major storms can raise the water level of the reservoirs by more than ten percent, so some lakes are only allowed to reach 60 percent of capacity in winter months. Also, reservoirs downstream of Fresno need to be filled to provide water for southern California, which also rarely get rain. So it becomes essential to continue releasing water from the reservoirs, even in severe drought.

Farmers depend on water to raise their crops. Rain water plays an important role in the health of crops, but water that is pumped into the farms through irrigation is even more important. As streams have dried up, farmers have turned to groundwater, but this quickly depleted the aquifers that supply the city of Fresno, to the point where the land began to sag. In the 80 years that the city of Fresno has used groundwater as a water source, the water level has dropped from 30 feet below the surface to 128 feet in 2009. This has resulted in the city of Fresno turning to alternate ways to reliably get clean water, such as aggressively recharging the ground water and occasionally purifying surface water for use by residents. This has helped to an extent, and groundwater levels have started to drop at slower rates, but more rain and runoff would help recharge them at a faster rate.

=== Earthquakes ===
The San Joaquin Valley has many geologic faults running below it. These faults can give way to large earthquakes. The largest recorded earthquakes have been the 1857 Fort Tejon earthquake and the 1952 Kern County earthquake. A smaller earthquake which affected the valley includes the 1983 Coalinga earthquake.

=== Floods ===
The San Joaquin Valley was inundated by the Great Flood of 1862, as well affected by other floods, such as in 1955 and 1964.

== See also ==
- Environmental impact of agriculture
- Environment of California
