= Burlington Northern & Santa Fe Railway Co. v. United States =

- Supreme Court of the United States

Decided May 4, 2009
- Full case name: Burlington Northern & Santa Fe Railway Co. v. United States
- Citations: 556 U.S. 599 (more)

Holding
- To be an "arranger" under CERCLA requires the specific intent to dispose toxic waste.

Court membership
- Chief Justice John Roberts Associate Justices John P. Stevens · Antonin Scalia; Anthony Kennedy · David Souter; Clarence Thomas · Ruth Bader Ginsburg; Stephen Breyer · Samuel Alito

Case opinions
- Majority: Stevens, joined by Roberts, Scalia, Kennedy, Souter, Thomas, Breyer, Alito
- Dissent: Ginsburg

Burlington Northern & Santa Fe Railway Co. v. United States, 556 U.S. 599 (2009), was a United States Supreme Court case in which the court held that to be an "arranger" under CERCLA requires the specific intent to dispose toxic waste.

== Background ==
The Comprehensive Environmental Response, Compensation, and Liability Act (CERCLA) is designed to promote the cleanup of hazardous waste sites and to ensure that cleanup costs are borne by those responsible for the contamination. In 1960, Brown & Bryant, Inc. (B&B), an agricultural chemical distributor, began operating on a parcel of land located in Arvin, California. B&B later expanded onto an adjacent parcel owned by petitioners Burlington Northern and Santa Fe Railway Company and Union Pacific Railroad Company (Railroads). As part of its business, B&B purchased and stored various hazardous chemicals, including the pesticide D–D, which it bought from petitioner Shell Oil Company (Shell). Over time, many of these chemicals spilled during transfers and deliveries, and as a result of equipment failures.

Investigations of B&B by the California Department of Toxic Substances Control and the federal Environmental Protection Agency (Governments) revealed significant soil and ground water contamination and in 1989, the Governments exercised their CERCLA authority to clean up the Arvin site, spending over $8 million by 1998. Seeking to recover their costs, the Governments initiated legal action against Shell and the Railroads. The federal District Court ruled in favor of the Governments, finding that both the Railroads and Shell were potentially responsible parties under CERCLA—the Railroads because they owned part of the facility and Shell because it had "arranged for disposal... of hazardous substances," through D–D's sale and delivery. The District Court apportioned liability, holding the Railroads liable for 9% of the Governments' total response costs, and Shell liable for 6%. On appeal, the Ninth Circuit Court of Appeals agreed that Shell could be held liable as an arranger under CERCLA and affirmed the District Court's decision in that respect. Although the Court of Appeals agreed that the harm in this case was theoretically capable of apportionment, it found the facts present in the record insufficient to support apportionment, and therefore held Shell and the Railroads jointly and severally liable for the Governments' response costs.

== Opinion of the court ==
The Supreme Court issued an opinion on May 4, 2009.
