= Cooper Drum Company =

- Superfund site
- Location within California
- Location: South Gate, Los Angeles County, California; 33°56′52″N 118°10′54″W

Information
- CERCLIS ID: CAD055753370
- Contaminants: VOCs, PCBs, PAHs, lead

Progress
- Proposed: January 11, 2001
- Listed: June 14, 2001

Cooper Drum Company recycled closed top, steel drums on a 3.8-acre (15,000 m^{2}) facility in South Gate, California, from 1976 to 2003. They used strong chemicals to recondition the drums, leading to public concern about health impacts on the surrounding community. In particular, staff and students from Tweedy Elementary School, which borders the Cooper Drum site to the south, complained of health problems that may have resulted from exposure to toxic chemical coming from Cooper Drum Company. In June 2001, the Cooper Drum site was placed on the Superfund list, marking the site as one of the most high priority toxic cleanup sites in the United States.

== History ==
The Cooper Drum site is located at 9316 South Atlantic Avenue in South Gate, Los Angeles California. The site is bordered by industrial properties to the north and east, commercial/residential properties to the west, and Tweedy Elementary School to the south. The site had been used for reconditioning steel drums since 1941 by a series of recycling companies. In 1976, the site was purchased by Cooper Drum Company. Cooper Drum Company’s main recycling operation was reconditioning steel drums. Initially the drum reconditioning was conducted along the southern portion of the property. This was an assembly line process along an elevated concrete floor. Drums were flushed and stripped with sodium hydroxide in preparation for painting and resale. The fluids from reconditioning were transferred to two holding tanks and five clarifiers. Any solid precipitate was pumped out and transported for off-site disposal, while the liquid was reused in the conditioning process. When the drums contained solid or highly viscous material, they were subjected to hard washing. From 1976 to 1992 hard washing was conducted on the northern part of the property. During this time, hard washing consisted of placing chains and sodium hydroxide inside the drums and rolling the drums over four concrete sumps that were fitted with grates. The runoff was collected in the four sumps that were connected by open concrete trenches.

In 1992, the drum reconditioning business was purchased by Waymire Drum Company resulting in a number of changes. Firstly, the hard washing operations were moved to the southern portion of the property and high pressure spraying was used in the place of chaining. Additionally, all the collection sumps and trenches, which had been open to the air were replaced with close topped steel tanks and hard piping. The tanks were placed over the sumps and hard piping over the trenches, allowing the initial sumps and trenches to serve as secondary containment for the upgraded equipment.

While the Cooper Drum site was owned by Waymire Drum Company, it was fitted to process plastic totes. Since 2003, no drum processing operations have occurred, and all drum processing equipment has been removed. From 2003 to 2006 the site was used by a pallet company, a trucking and towing company, and two automotive repair and salvage companies.

== Health concerns ==
Beginning in 1986, both staff and students at Tweedy Elementary school began complaining of various health problems, including stomach aches, headaches, sore throats, and asthma. Staff at Tweedy and parents of the students believed the negative symptoms were caused by exposure to toxic chemicals from nearby industries. The most notable industry was Cooper Drum Company, as it was separated from Tweedy Elementary only by a brick wall. Spurred on by popular demand, surveys and health exams of staff and students were conducted by both the Los Angeles County Department of Health Services and Los Angeles Unified School District (LAUSD). However, these studies did not show any significantly greater health problems for the students and staff at Tweedy as compared to San Gabriel Elementary, a comparable school located in a residential neighborhood.

Though the health problems of the staff and students at Tweedy Elementary could not be directly tied to Cooper Drum Co., the risks of having the elementary school next to the drum reconditioning site became apparent in April 1987. A quantity of highly caustic liquid, believed to be composed mainly of sodium hydroxide and oil, seeped underground from Cooper Drum Co. to exposed soil on the Tweedy Elementary property. The county cited Cooper Drum Co. for the contamination. Cooper Drum Co. paid for the excavation of this soil, and subsequent repaving, but this incident compounded the previous public health concerns. LAUSD closed the school in 1988.

In 1989, 20 employees, from secretaries to district psychologists, returned to Tweedy without students. Health complaints persisted, with some employees reporting recurring rashes that would go away when they were away from work for extended periods of time. After the Environmental Protection Agency (EPA) began considering the Cooper Drum site as a possible Superfund site, the employees staffed at Tweedy called for their relocation. In March 1992, the employees were permanently moved from Tweedy Elementary. Tweedy Elementary School has since relocated.

== EPA involvement ==
Since the chemical seep into Tweedy Elementary in 1987, at least eight soil sampling events have been conducted at the Cooper Drum site. Initial testing discovered tainted soils up to depths of 30 feet (9.1 m) and polluted water up to 53 feet (16 m) below the site. Following its Preliminary Assessment/Site Inspection (PA/SI) the EPA gave the Cooper Drum site a Hazard Ranking System score of 50.1. In order for a site to be considered for the Superfund list, it must receive at least 28.5 points on the Hazard Ranking System scale.

The Cooper Drum site was placed onto the Superfund list on June 14, 2001, and the EPA finished conducting its Remedial Investigation of the site in May 2002. The investigation found significant amounts of volatile organic compounds VOCs (including tetrachloroethylene (PCE), trichloroethylene (TCE), and dichloroethylene (DCE)), petroleum hydrocarbons, polychlorinated biphenyls, polyaromatic hydrocarbons, and lead. The investigation found that shallow depths of groundwater were contaminated. However, fine grained materials like clays and silts had helped prevent vertical migration of VOCs into deeper aquifers that are used for drinking water.

Following the study, the EPA issued a Record of Decision (ROD), which selected the actions to take at the site. The groundwater remedy consisted of using a combination of in situ chemical oxidation (ISCO) and extraction and treatment of contaminated groundwater. To treat the soil, the EPA is using dual phase extraction (DPE) to protect the aquifer that lies below the site. This technique extracts contaminated soil vapors and groundwater simultaneously.

== See also ==
- List of Superfund sites in California
