= Ralph Gray Trucking Co. =

- Superfund site
- Location within California
- Location: Westminster, California, Orange, California; 33°44′58″N 118°00′18″W

Information
- CERCLIS ID: CAD981995947
- Contaminants: VOCs, PCHs, Sulfates

Progress
- Proposed: July 29, 1991
- Listed: October 14, 1992
- Deleted: September 28, 2004

The Ralph Gray Trucking Co. site is a former Superfund site in Westminster, California, United States. It was formerly a disposal site for petroleum waste products until a developer built residential homes on top of the field. The United States Environmental Protection Agency added the site to its National Priorities List of Superfund sites in 1992 and took it off in 2004 after extensive clean up efforts.

== History ==
The land on which the 23-acre site sits was on the Murdy Dairy Farm. Beginning in 1936, the potentially responsible party, suspected to be Ralph Gray, the owner of the trucking company, acid sludge, oil field wastes, and oil refinery wastes and disposed of them in four unlined pits at the farm. After complaints from Westminster residents to local health officials and the Chamber of Commerce, Gray was fined $100 by a court and ordered to clean up the problem within 30 days. However he failed to do so, and the problem persisted until the 1950s.

The Hintz Development Company moved the waste from the unlined pits to unlined trenches in 1958, burying the waste with several feet of soil under about 25 homes out of 75 in the whole residential development. Another five homes were built over the original pits. Residents started complaining of rising black sludge in 1965, which was semi solid in cooler weather but liquified in the warm summer air. Residents also complained as they discovered the sludge as they excavated in their backyards for swimming pools and other projects.

=== Cleanup Effort ===
The California Department of Health Services removed toxic seep as it emerged every year between 1987 and 1991. In 1992, the EPA began its clean up by temporarily evacuating residents from homes housing them in government funded hotels and rental units. A contractor excavated the surface waste seeps and buried wastes, removing about 45,000 cubic yards of hazardous waste and backfilling homes with clean material and replaced with further landscaping and improvements.

The EPA took the site off the NPL in 2004 after cleanup was completed and soil tests found the worst contamination had been removed.

=== Health Concerns ===
The DHS completed several assessments and studies between 1988 and 1991 that found exposure for the waste was mostly through inhalation, ingestion, and skin contact. Children played with the seep material like ‘silly putty” and used the waste as chewing gum, while adults had skin discoloration and a burning sensation from handling the material during yard excavations. Asthma, allergies, and other respiratory problems plagued sensitive populations due to inhalation exposure.

== See also ==
List of Superfund sites in California
