= Leviathan Mine =

- Superfund site
- Location within California
- Location: Markleeville, Alpine County, California; 38°42′23″N 119°39′08″W

Information
- CERCLIS ID: CAD98067685
- Contaminants: Acid mine drainage: sulfuric acid, arsenic, copper, nickel, zinc, chromium, aluminum, iron

Progress
- Proposed: October 22, 1999
- Listed: May 11, 2000

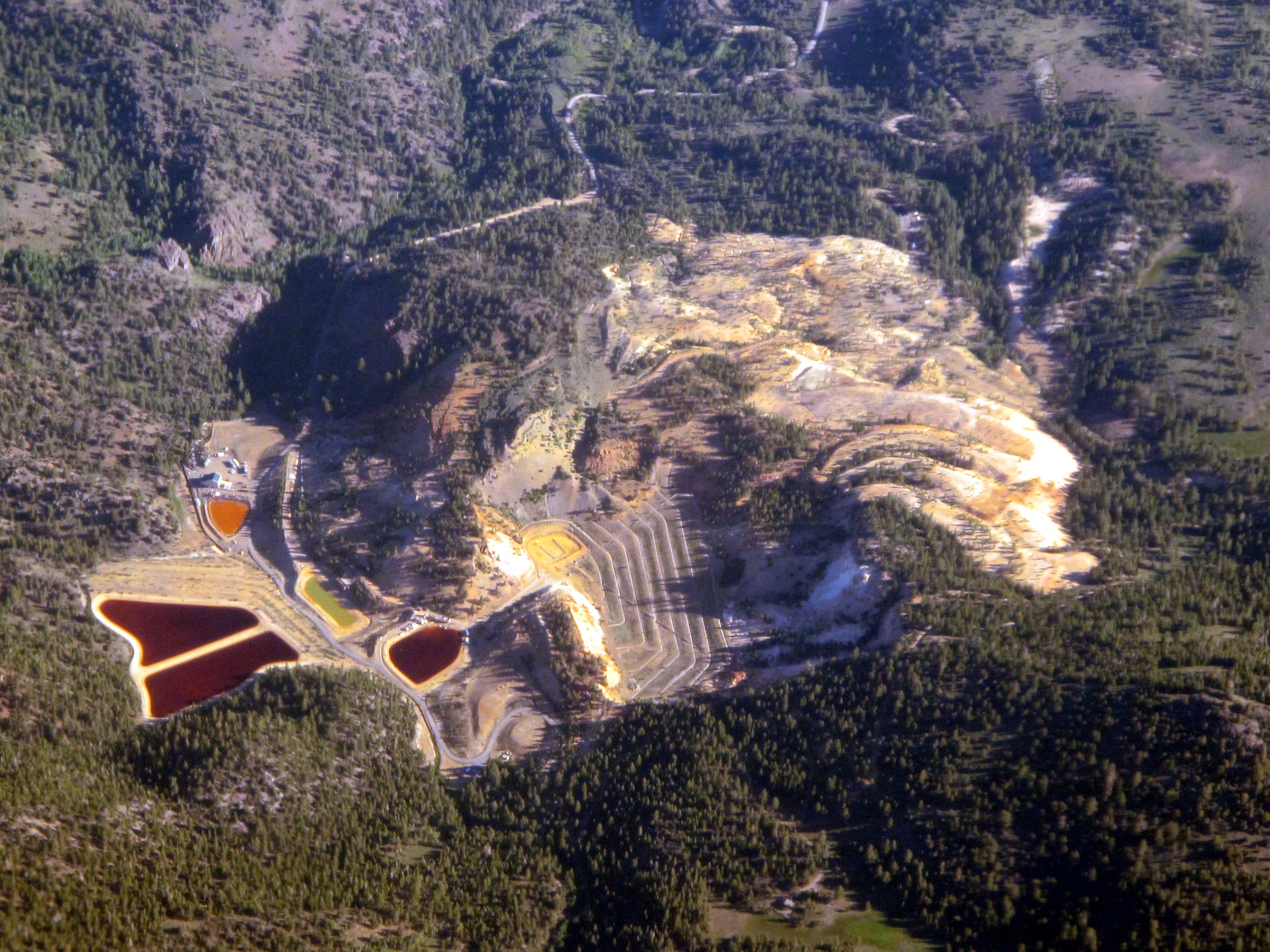
Leviathan Mine from the air, with reclamation in progress, 2010

Leviathan Mine is a United States superfund site (CERCLIS ID: CAD98067685) at an abandoned open-pit sulfur mine located in Alpine County, California. The mine is located on the eastern slope of the Sierra Nevada at about 7,000-foot (2,100 m) elevation, 6 miles (9.7 km) east of Markleeville and 24 miles (39 km) southeast of Lake Tahoe. The mine site comprises approximately 250 acres (100 ha) of land surrounded by the Toiyabe National Forest, which is only accessible a few months a year. The approximately 22 million tons of sulfur ore-containing crushed rock at the mine are responsible for contaminating the Leviathan and Aspen Creek, which join with Mountaineer Creek to form Bryant Creek which ultimately empties into the East Fork of the Carson River. These water bodies are listed as 303(d) impaired. The site location is seismically active.

== Mining history ==
Pre-open pit mining began in 1863 by Comstock Lode miners. Between 1863 and 1870, 500 tons of copper sulfate was removed from two adits. This copper sulfate was used for silver ore refining. A large sulfur deposit was discovered in one of the adits and the mine was subsequently abandoned. Between 1935 and 1941 Calpine Corporation of Los Angeles, which subleased the mine from the Texas Gulf Sulfur Company, conducted subsurface sulfur mining and recovered 5,000 tons of sulfur. Mining was suspended in 1941 due to the hazardous nature of mining sulfur underground. In 1945 the Siskon Mining Corporation, acquired the mine.

Open-pit mining of sulfur was initiated at the site when Anaconda Copper Mining Company purchased the Leviathan in 1951. The extracted sulfur was used for copper ore processing at Anaconda Copper Mine (Nevada). During its excavating operations and Leviathan (1953–1962), Anaconda turned the original mine into a 50-acre (20 ha), 400-foot-deep (120 m) pit, and removed approximately 500,000 long tons of sulfur. During this time period acid mine drainage (AMD) began contaminating Leviathan Creek. In 1963, Anaconda sold the property to founders of the Alpine Mining Enterprises, Zella N. Mann and William Chris Mann, who was the Alpine County Clerk.

== Post-mining clean-up ==
Site cleanup began with the 1983-1985 formation of the Leviathan Mine Pollution Abatement Project by the Lahontan Regional Water Quality Control Board (LRWQCB) which was built in an effort to mitigate acid mine drainage. The State of California acquired Leviathan from Alpine Mining Enterprises in 1984, and the California State Water Resources Control Board gained jurisdiction over the property. The Leviathan Mine Pollution Abatement Project consisted of building drains beneath the pit to capture contaminated water and making evaporation ponds, filling and regrading the pit, and separating uncontaminated surface water from AMD groundwater. Results of the project include the discovery of unknown acidic springs and accidental AMD discharge directly into Leviathan Creek via a drain line.

In 1997 the United States Environmental Protection Agency (EPA) became involved in the cleanup of Leviathan Mine at the request of the Washoe Tribe of Nevada and California. The tribe had concerns about overflow from evaporation ponds onto downstream tribal lands and the impacts of AMD on their cultural and natural resources. The EPA Region IX tried unsuccessfully to use a lime neutralization treatment of the AMD. In 1998, the Atlantic Richfield Company (ARCO), who purchased Anaconda in 1977, was issued an Administrative Order on Consent (AOC) by the EPA that obligated them to aid in the mitigation of AMD flow into Leviathan creek. However, due to the use of unproven technologies implemented by ARCO Environmental Remediation, L.L.C. and the logistical challenges of getting supplies to the mine this effort had limited success. Then in 1999, a biphasic neutralization water treatment plant was established by the LRWQCB to treat AMD in the evaporation ponds and minimize over flow into Leviathan Creek.

In 1999 the EPA proposed making Leviathan's open-pit sulfur mine a superfund site by adding it to the National Priorities List for hazardous waste sites. In 2000 EPA added the mine to the NPL, and had the written support of the Washoe Tribe, Alpine County, California, the State of Nevada, Douglas County, Nevada and the Carson River Conservancy District. The LRWQCB was issued an Administrative Abatement Action (AAA) in 2000 (which was renewed in 2001, 2002, 2003, 2004, and 2005) by the EPA in order to continue the biphasic treatment, water quality monitoring and other actives. Since 2005, the involvement of the LRWQCB is determined by the EPA Remedial Project Manager for the mine. In 2000, a unilateral administrative order was issued to ARCO, in which the EPA required ARCO to conduct early response actions and develop a long-term response plan for mitigating AMD.

In 1993 the State of California set up a pilot scale one-cell bioreactor with manure substrate for AMD treatment at Leviathan Creek Seep. By 1998, researchers from the University of Nevada-Reno (UNR) installed a two cell bioreactor at Aspen seep. By 2001, the Aspen seep bioreactor treated 2.5 million gallons of AMD. The design evolved over time and in 2003, at the behest of the State of California, ARCO and the UNR researchers developed a compost-free sulfate reducing bioreactor at Aspen Seep.

== Environmental damage ==
Sulfuric acid is produced at the open-pit mine when water, such as rain, snow melt or groundwater, interacts with the waste rock. This sulfuric acid leaches contaminants from surrounding rock, such as arsenic, copper, nickel, zinc, chromium, aluminum and iron. This acid rock drainage ARD, with a low pH, and high concentrations of dissolved sulfate and metals, flows into the surrounding watershed and has adverse effects on water quality through deposition of metal-rich precipitates, which cascade through the ecosystem affecting algae, insect, and fish. The site is unvegetated and is susceptible to erosion due to several long steep slopes. The instability resulting from the open-pit mine has resulted in several landslides, with one affecting over 100 acres (40 ha).

== Human health concerns ==
Contact with contaminates from the mine can result in both cancerous and non-cancerous health effects depending on where, when, and how long the exposure occurred. Arsenic poses the most significant health risk to exposed individuals via contact with contaminated surface water and sediment. Other risks for exposure include eating fish, plants and wild game collected near the mine, inhalation of dust near the mine, and or eating animals raised near Leviathan. In general, avoiding contact with mine tailings, surface water, and sediments in Leviathan, Aspen, and Bryant creeks, as well as the River Ranch Irrigation channel will reduce contaminate exposure and therefore reduce health risks.

== Biphasic neutralization water treatment ==
Biphasic neutralization water treatment is a two-step process. Phase I raises the pH of the outflow to the point that iron precipitates out of solution as ferric hydroxide and arsenic co-precipitates with the ferric hydroxide. This sludge is then removed and disposed of at an appropriate hazardous waste facility. In Phase II the pH of the effluent is raised again and additional metals precipitate. Much of this sludge is non-hazardous and is stored at Leviathan. The remaining wastewater can then be discharged into Leviathan Creek.

== Compost-free sulfate reducing bioreactor ==
The compost-free sulfate reducing bioreactor employs sulfate-reducing microbes (e.g. Desulfovibrio sp.) to reduce sulfate to sulfide at pH 4.0 . However, the ARD at Aspen Seep is too acidic (pH 3.1) and is pretreated with sodium hydroxide solution. Ethanol, the carbon source for the sulfate reducing microbes, is also added to the system (,). The solution is reduced from sulfate to sulfide in Bioreactor No. 1, which is lined with 60 mil high-density polyethylene (HDPE) and filled with river rocks, which aid in the flow of effluent. The sulfide effluent is passed into Bioreactor No. 2 for additional metal removal. Next, sodium hydroxide is added to the effluent to increase the pH to neutral, and it is sent through two settling ponds (to allow for the settling of metal sulfide precipitates) and a rock-lined aeration channel for degassing of hydrogen sulfide. At the end of the aeration channel the effluent is released into Aspen Creek.

== See also ==
- List of Superfund sites in California
