= Beagle Club radiation experiments =

1950s-1990s US studies

The "Beagle Club" radiation experiments were a series of studies sponsored by the United States Atomic Energy Commission, which took place over four decades starting in the 1950s. They were conducted across six American states at research facilities including Argonne National Laboratory, Colorado State University, Pacific Northwest National Laboratory, University of California, Davis, University of Utah, and the Inhalation Toxicology Research Institute in Albuquerque.

Studies on the effect of radiation on rats and mice started during and immediately following World War II. Although data from these early studies contributed to setting radiation exposure limits for humans, the small size and short life span of rodents made it difficult to confidently extrapolate what low-level exposure to radiation over longer periods would mean for humans. Experimentation on dogs began at the University of Chicago, University of California, Berkeley, and the University of Rochester. These studies focused on topics such as radionuclide distribution and acute radiation effects, and involved relatively few dogs for short periods of time.

The first two major life-span experiments involving beagles began at the University of California, Davis, and at the University of Utah.

== University of California, Davis ==
Two projects were conducted at the Radiobiology Laboratory at University of California, Davis. The first, Project Four, started in 1951 with the objective of studying the long-term effects of sub-lethal and mid-lethal x-irradiation exposure. The second, Project Six, started in 1957 to investigate the effects of ingesting low levels of radionuclides.

The facility, which became known as the Laboratory for Energy-Related Health Research (LEHR), occupied 15 acres of land. Both projects had the capacity to hold up to five hundred dogs in two-dog pens. By the time the center closed in 1986, the 1,063 female beagles had been exposed to radiation, while many more dogs passed through the facility for breeding and as control subjects.

In the 1990s, the remains of 800 irradiated dogs, their toxic feces, and contaminated gravel were dug up, put in metal drums, and sent to a nuclear disposal site in Washington state. In 2018, UC Davis agreed in a settlement with the United States Environmental Protection Agency to spend $14 million to clean up the landfill adjacent to the former laboratory complex.
