= Rancho Casmalia =

Land grant in California

Coordinates: 34.880°N 120.570°W

Rancho Casmalia was a 8,841-acre (35.78 km^{2}) Mexican land grant in present-day Santa Barbara County, California given in 1840 by Governor Juan Alvarado to Jose Maria del Carmen Domínguez and Antonio Olivera. The grant extended along the Pacific coast from Point Sal and Rancho Guadalupe on the north, through the Casmalia Hills to Shuman Canyon and Rancho Jesús María on the south, and encompasses present-day Casmalia.

With the cession of California to the United States following the Mexican-American War, the 1848 Treaty of Guadalupe Hidalgo provided that the land grants would be honored. As required by the Land Act of 1851, a claim for Rancho Casmalia was filed with the Public Land Commission in 1852, and the grant was patented to Antonio Olivera in 1863.

== See also ==
- Ranchos of California
- List of Ranchos of California
