= Halaco Engineering Co. =

Superfund site at a scrap metal recycling facility in Oxnard, California

Halaco Engineering, Co., Metal Recycling Facility
- Superfund site
- Location within California
- Location: Oxnard, Ventura County, California; 34°08′20″N 119°10′55″W

Information
- CERCLIS ID: CAD009688052
- Contaminants: aluminum, arsenic, barium, beryllium, cadmium, cesium-137, chromium, copper, lead, magnesium, manganese, nickel, potassium-40, silver, thorium-228, thorium-230, thorium-232, zinc
- Responsible parties: 6

Progress
- Proposed: March 7, 2007
- Listed: September 19, 2007

Halaco Engineering Co. operated a scrap metal recycling facility at 6200 Perkins Road, Oxnard, Ventura County, California from 1965 to 2004. The state placed the facility on the California Hazardous Waste Priority List in 2007. The facility includes a smelter area west and the Waste Management Unit (WMU) east of the Oxnard Industrial Drain (OID). Attention was brought to the Halaco site through illegal waste disposal without permits. Further investigation yielded a discovery of harmful contaminants. Remediation of surrounding contaminated areas including the wetlands was completed in 2007. Restoration of the wetlands and management of the WMU are ongoing.

== History ==
The Halaco Superfund Site is a 43-acre (17 ha) nonferrous metal recycling facility that operated primarily to process aluminum and magnesium metals from 1965 to 2004. The site is located on both sides of the Oxnard Industrial Drain (OID), which flows through a perennial beach lagoon and wetlands adjacent to Ormond Beach that extends from Port Hueneme to the northwestern boundary of Navy Base Ventura County, at Point Mugu. The degradation by dumping and agricultural uses dates back to the founding of Oxnard with the placement of the outfall from a five-mile-long (8.0 km) pipeline serving the sugar beet processing plant that operated from 1899 until 1959. This south edge of the Oxnard Plain has been attractive to industrial uses with an 11-acre (4 ha) containerboard mill facility opening in 1955 immediately adjacent to the north along Perkins Road. The City of Oxnard Wastewater Treatment plant is west, across the street with an electrical generating plant, that began commercial operation in 1971, just south along the beach.

Prior to 1970, Halaco discharged wastewater into the OID and a small lagoon on the smelter property. In 1971, a waste management unit (unlined earthen evaporation pond) was constructed. Dumping of hazardous waste into this area has resulted in contamination of surrounding areas, including soils and groundwater, as well as uncontrolled emissions of ammonia, sulfur dioxide, and particulate matter. Coastal wetlands which are home to endangered species including the snowy plover and the California least tern, as well as fisheries in the adjacent Pacific Ocean, have been affected by zinc, lead, ammonia, and arsenic. In 1979, the U.S. Army Corps of Engineers attempted to stop Halaco from dumping waste into the wetlands but dropped the effort after the company sued. Halaco filed for bankruptcy and ended operations at the property in 2004. An estimated 700,000 cubic yards (540,000 m^{3}) of waste remain onsite.

The property had become an encampment for homeless people when in 2017, the city council decided to dismantle and clean up the collection of makeshift homes. Another eviction and clean-up occurred in 2021. As of November 2026, about 135 people were living at the site in tents and vehicles.

== Contamination ==
The waste pile and associated surface impoundment currently contain approximately 700,000 cubic yards (540,000 m^{3}) of waste. Preliminary site contamination investigations have revealed a combination of several metals and radionuclides, including aluminum, arsenic, barium, beryllium, cadmium, chromium, copper, lead, magnesium, manganese, nickel, silver, zinc, cesium-137, potassium-40, thorium-228, thorium-230, and thorium-232. The culmination of these wastes led to contaminated air, groundwater, and soil risks. All of these factors caused minor concern for the well-being of nearby residents. On September 19, 2007, the State of California placed the Halaco Metal Recycling Facility on the California Hazardous Waste Priority List.

== Health effects ==
In the 1990s, nearby community members complained of an acrid smell coming from the waste pile, air emissions turning into acid clouds and noxious fumes, and skin irritation. The California Department of Public Health also reviewed the available health information related to the possible health effects caused by the Halaco contamination. This review includes information on asthma, cancer, birth defects, low birth weight, and preterm births for communities more likely exposed to contaminants from Halaco in the past.

== Remediation ==
The EPA identified 6 companies as waste contributors, labeling them as Potentially Responsible Parties (PRPs).

The assessment consists of the following measures:

- Surface and subsurface gamma radiation survey via down-hole gamma radiation monitoring
- Collection of surface and subsurface solids and soil samples using a Geoprobe with a MacroCore
- Collection of groundwater samples using temporary wells

In April 2007, coir matting was installed around the Waste Management Unit in order to prevent erosion of contaminated soils. Additionally, a 6-foot barbed wire fence perimeter was constructed around the WMU.

As of June 5, 2007, 11 sample holes and 3 background holes were installed. Ongoing monitoring occurs by scanning for metals using the Niton XRF and the Smith Detection System HAZMAT ID to screen for other chemical contaminants. If other contaminants are detected, those samples will be submitted for laboratory analysis.

The EPA removed two structurally unsafe buildings in 2010 but squatters, drugs and graffiti continued to be problem. By 2014, the remaining brick buildings were at risk of collapse due to fires, so the city demolished them after the removal of asbestos.

== Timeline ==
- 1965: Halaco began operating metal reclaiming facility.
- 1969: Obtained a Radioactive Materials License to handle magnesium-thorium alloy scrap.
- Pre-1970: Wastewater was discharged into the Oxnard Industrial Drain (OID) and a small lagoon on property.
- 1971: Existing unlined earthen evaporation pond (WMU) constructed.
- 1977: U.S. Army Corps of Engineers served a Cease and Desist Order for Halaco to stop dumping solid material into the wetlands.
- 1980: USEPA issued an enforcement order under the Clean Water Act stating that the disposal site was a wetland and required a NPDES permit for operation.
- 2000: Oxnard Fire Department served search warrant for illegal disposal of oil.
- June 2000: LARWQCB estimated that 430,000 cubic yards (330,000 m^{3}) of waste material present in WMU at thicknesses varying from 20 to 40 feet (6.1 to 12.2 m).
- September 2002: Halaco ceased discharging into the QMU in response to LARWQCB's Cease and Desist Order; began implementing filter press to process waste material.
- June 2003: Permit to discharge into sewer terminated; sewer discharge ceased.
- Late-2003: Filter cake deemed improperly stored by LARWQCB; Halaco issued cleanup order due to threatened impact on Ormond Beach and wetlands, Oxnard groundwater, and the OID; DHS issued order to characterize radioactive material.
- 2004: All Halaco process operation ceased, all employees fired, and filtercake and baghouse dust sent to La Paz Landfill in Arizona for disposal.
- 2006: Assessment of site conducted and completed by EPA Emergency Response Section.
- February 2007: EPA began stabilization action of the Halaco site in an effort to control runoff and windborne contaminants into surrounding wetlands and OID.
- March 2007: EPA closed Ormond Beach Wetland access due to discovery of elevated levels of alpha radiation and waste process solids in the wetlands; thorium wastes removed and transferred to WMU.
- April 2007: Erosion control of coir matting installed and a 6' barbed wire fence erected around perimeter of WMU.
- September 2007: Site listed on the National Priority List.
- March 2008: Removal operations completed.
- 2010: EPA removed two structurally unsafe buildings.
- October 2014: City demolished remaining buildings after fires leave them structurally unsafe.
- March 2015: Oxnard Councilmember Bryan MacDonald testified before a House appropriations subcommittee requesting that a Superfund program to clean up the site be fully funded.
- December 2021: City Manager says the EPA will release a document detailing how to address the site next year. He hopeful that money in the Infrastructure Investment and Jobs Act will be dedicated to the clean up.

== See also ==
- List of Superfund sites in California
