= AMCO Chemical =

Coordinates: 37.802818°N 122.294918°W

AMCO Chemical was a chemical distribution company located in Oakland, California. The land the company operated on is designated as a U.S. Environmental Protection Agency (EPA) Superfund cleanup site.

Operated from the 1960s until 1989, chemicals were brought to the company in rail tank cars. The contents were off-loaded into 55-gallon drums which were stored on the lot until the chemicals were transferred into smaller containers for re-sale. An investigation by the Oakland Fire Department, Alameda County and the U.S. Coast Guard found over 100 full and empty 5- and 55-gallon drums, some of which were leaking. Subsequent to AMCO ceasing operations in 1989, the lot was used by DC Metals for scrap storage until 1998, and by Cable Moore, Inc. for cable storage until the present time.

In June 1995, a construction crew digging a trench noted a strong chemical odor in the dirt. The California Department of Transportation (Caltrans), DC Metals, and the Environmental Protection Agency (EPA) conducted an investigation which uncovered chlorinated solvents and other contaminants, including vinyl chloride, and soil gas. Due to the presence of groundwater found during the investigation, emergency remediation processes were initiated but later ceased before completion.

The EPA had collected enough data to determine the nature and extent of contamination in the groundwater and soil beneath the former facility. Around 90 chemicals in the groundwater and 40 chemicals in soil beneath the former AMCO facility exceeded screening levels. The EPA also collected soil and produce samples in the yards of residences next to the former AMCO facility fence line (on Center and Third streets). The samples were tested for VOCs, metals and pesticides. Lead was detected at high concentrations in a limited number of soil samples. The levels in the shallow and deep soil samples range from 26.2 to 53,000 milligrams/kilogram (mg/kg). Some of these levels are well above levels that would be considered safe for residential exposure, particularly for children. Urban soils typically have lead levels of about 500 mg/kg. In Oakland, naturally occurring lead level for native soil is 14 mg/kg.

The site was listed on the National Priority List (Superfund) on September 29, 2003. The detailed remediation investigation concluded in 2006.

== Remediation activities ==
=== Initial remediation (1997-1998) ===
Remediation efforts began with the construction of a ground water and soil vapor extraction (SVE) treatment system. Between January 1997 through July 1998, approximately 7,000 pounds of volatile organic compounds (VOCs), approximately 40 pounds of which were vinyl chloride, were extracted from the soil and groundwater. The SVE ceased operation in July 1998 due to concerns from nearby residents over exposure to fumes from the exhaust of the system. During the remediation process, additional contamination from methylene chloride, 1,1,1-Trichloroethane (TCA), and trichloroethene (TCE) were discovered. Detailed assessments taken during the emergency remediation effort revealed that the danger to the surrounding residences was not imminent but the site would pose long-term dangers.

=== Second decontamination (2015-2018) ===
A second round of soil vapor extraction from the contaminated site occurred in 2017 after years of planning and setup. A SVE system was used to extract toxic vapor from soil on the site in a $10 million dollar operation. By 2018 all equipment had been removed by the EPA.

== See also ==
- List of Superfund sites in California
