= Casmalia, California =

Casmalia
- Census-designated place
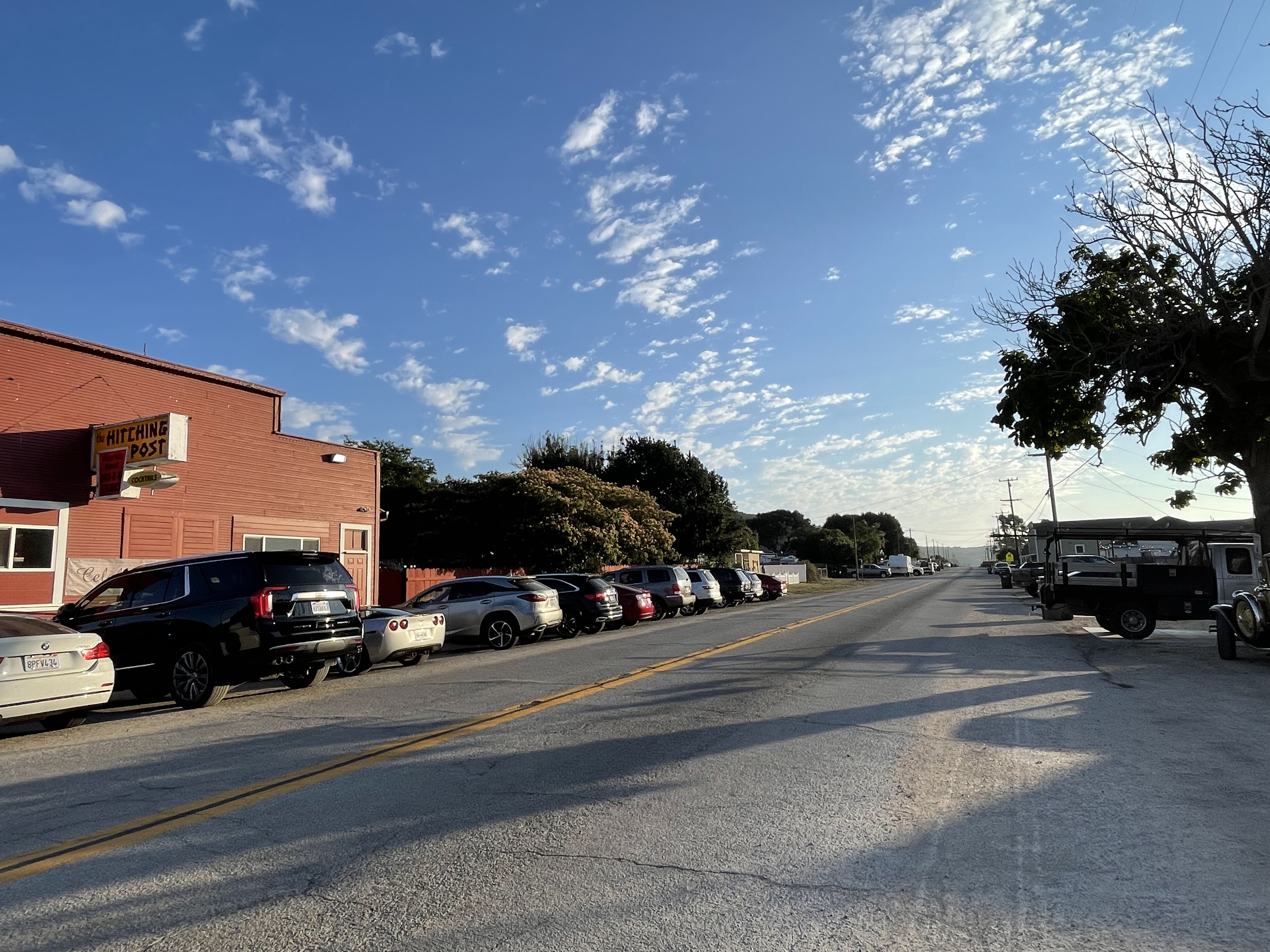
- Casmalia in 2023.

- Location of Casmalia in Santa Barbara County, California.

- Position in California.
- Coordinates: 34°50′15″N 120°31′52″W
- Country: United States
- State: California
- County: Santa Barbara

Area
  - Total: 0.17 sq mi (0.43 km^{2})
  - Land: 0.17 sq mi (0.43 km^{2})
  - Water: 0 sq mi (0.00 km^{2}) 0%
- Elevation: 276 ft (84 m)

Population (2020)
  - Total: 147
  - Density: 877.3/sq mi (338.73/km^{2})
- Time zone: UTC-8 (Pacific (PST))
  - Summer (DST): UTC-7 (PDT)
- ZIP Code: 93429
- Area code: 805
- GNIS feature ID: 2582965

Casmalia (Chumash: Kasma’li, meaning "it is the last") is a census-designated place (CDP) in Santa Barbara County, California, United States, located just outside the borders of Vandenberg Air Force Base, approximately 5 miles (8.0 km) southwest of Santa Maria. The ZIP Code is 93429, and the community is served by area code 805. The population was 147 at the 2020 census.

== History ==
Casmalia is located on the 1840 Mexican land grant, Rancho Casmalia. The formal town was founded by Antonio Tognazzini in the mid-1890s and was then named Someo, after the village of origin of the Tognazzini family, Someo, Switzerland. When the post office was opened, however, it was named Casmalia, rather than Someo, because of a name conflict with another California town, and the name Someo was eventually dropped.

The new railroad town soon swelled to more than 1500 people in its early years. One hundred years later, that population had shrunk to less than 200 because of the Casmalia Resources Hazardous Waste Landfill facility. During the heyday of the Casmalia Oil Field, the present town served as the red light district for the Union Oil Company workers who lived in the nearby Casmalia Hills.

1.2 miles (1.9 km) north of the town, this 252-acre (1.02 km^{2}) hazardous waste landfill began operating in 1973 and accepted toxic chemicals like PCBs, motor oil, and pesticides. In 1989, the facility was closed down following a number of permit violations. In 1992, it was taken over by the federal Environmental Protection Agency, which began the process of cleaning up and administering the site.

The soil and groundwater at the site were significantly contaminated and the former dump became a Superfund site. During its operation, 5.6 billion pounds of hazardous waste from up to 10,000 individuals, businesses and government agencies were buried at the site.

The public area of the hotel built by Antonio Tognazzini and operated by Frank A. Vandoit more than 100 years ago still exists, although the guest rooms were torn down in 1944. The building is now occupied by The Hitching Post barbecue restaurant.

The superfund site still continues to be worked on over the hill.

== Geography ==
According to the United States Census Bureau, the CDP covers an area of 0.2 square mile (0.5 km^{2}), all land.

=== Climate ===
This region experiences warm (but not hot) and dry summers, with no average monthly temperatures above 71.6 °F. According to the Köppen Climate Classification system, Casmalia has a warm-summer Mediterranean climate, abbreviated "Csb" on climate maps.

== Demographics ==
Historical population
| Census | Pop. | Note | %± |
|---|---|---|---|
| 2010 | 138 | | — |
| 2020 | 147 | | 6.5% |
U.S. Decennial Census; 1860–1870 1880-1890; 1900 1910 1920; 1930 1940 1950; 1960 1970 1980; 1990 2000 2010; 2020

Casmalia first appeared as a census designated place in the 2010 U.S. census.

=== Racial and ethnic composition ===
Casmalia CDP, California – Racial and ethnic composition Note: the US Census treats Hispanic/Latino as an ethnic category. This table excludes Latinos from the racial categories and assigns them to a separate category. Hispanics/Latinos may be of any race.
| Race / Ethnicity (NH = Non-Hispanic) | Pop 2010 | Pop 2020 | % 2010 | % 2020 |
|---|---|---|---|---|
| White alone (NH) | 74 | 73 | 53.62% | 49.66% |
| Black or African American alone (NH) | 3 | 0 | 2.17% | 0.00% |
| Native American or Alaska Native alone (NH) | 0 | 0 | 0.00% | 0.00% |
| Asian alone (NH) | 1 | 1 | 0.72% | 0.68% |
| Native Hawaiian or Pacific Islander alone (NH) | 0 | 0 | 0.00% | 0.00% |
| Other race alone (NH) | 0 | 0 | 0.00% | 0.00% |
| Mixed race or Multiracial (NH) | 2 | 10 | 1.45% | 6.80% |
| Hispanic or Latino (any race) | 58 | 63 | 42.03% | 42.86% |
| Total | 138 | 147 | 100.00% | 100.00% |

=== 2020 census ===
As of the 2020 census, Casmalia had a population of 147. The population density was 875.0 inhabitants per square mile (337.8/km^{2}). 0.0% of residents lived in urban areas, while 100.0% lived in rural areas. For every 100 females there were 98.6 males, and for every 100 females age 18 and over there were 105.7 males age 18 and over.

The racial makeup of Casmalia was 95 (64.6%) White, 0 (0.0%) African American, 0 (0.0%) Native American, 8 (5.4%) Asian, 0 (0.0%) Pacific Islander, 25 (17.0%) from other races, and 19 (12.9%) from two or more races. Hispanic or Latino of any race were 63 persons (42.9%).

The age distribution was 38 people (25.9%) under the age of 18, 11 people (7.5%) aged 18 to 24, 39 people (26.5%) aged 25 to 44, 42 people (28.6%) aged 45 to 64, and 17 people (11.6%) who were 65 years of age or older. The median age was 42.1 years. There were 73 males and 74 females.

The whole population lived in households. There were 46 households, out of which 23 (50.0%) had children under the age of 18 living in them, 22 (47.8%) were married-couple households, 1 (2.2%) were cohabiting couple households, 12 (26.1%) had a female householder with no partner present, and 11 (23.9%) had a male householder with no partner present. 11 households (23.9%) were one person, and 7 (15.2%) were one person aged 65 or older. The average household size was 3.2. There were 30 families (65.2% of all households).

There were 53 housing units at an average density of 315.5 units per square mile (121.8 units/km^{2}), of which 46 (86.8%) were occupied. Of these, 27 (58.7%) were owner-occupied, and 19 (41.3%) were occupied by renters. The homeowner vacancy rate was 3.6% and the rental vacancy rate was 0.0%.
