= Casmalia Resources Hazardous Waste Landfill =

Landfill and Superfund site in California, US

Coordinates: 34.86287°N 120.54408°W

The Casmalia Resources Hazardous Waste Landfill was a 252–acre disposal facility located in the hills near Casmalia, California. During its operation, 5.6 billion pounds of hazardous waste from up to 10,000 individuals, businesses and government agencies were dumped on site. The facility was closed in 1989, and is now a listed as a Superfund site by the Environmental Protection Agency.

== History ==
=== Years of operation (1973–1989) ===
The Casmalia Resources Hazardous Waste Landfill opened in 1973 as a dumpsite for waste products generated by small-scale oil and agricultural operations. The facility later expanded to accept hazardous wastes like PCBs, solvents and pesticides, becoming one of only two such facilities in the region. Approximately 40,000 gallons a day of toxic liquid waste were sent to Casmalia in the 1980s from Stringfellow Acid Pits, a hazardous waste dump in Southern California that was one of the first Superfund sites in the United States.

On August 12, 1980, a sign painter and Santa Maria resident Les Conrad arrived on location at the Casmalia facility to perform sign work. He witnessed numerous lagoons filled with toxic waste that were unlined. He became concerned on this initial visit and several subsequent ones where he performed sign work that there was a potential for groundwater contamination. Conrad became concerned for the health of the Valley's more than 60,000 residents and his own young children and began to research the original permit application for the site in 1972. In a book Conrad later wrote about his experience, Desperate Remedies, he outlines a corrupt and suspect process for the original permit by the County Board of Supervisors raising concerns that the site was unsafe. Conrad brought his concerns to local government. However, some of the same officials responsible for the original licensing were still involved with state agencies and the response that he received was suboptimal at best. At considerable expense Conrad began testing the drinking water from local wells and school drinking fountains. He found the same chemicals in these wells and drinking fountains that were being dumped at Casmalia. This led to a several year journey of attempting to bring his concerns to the attention of the public and local government. Despite multiple presentations at County Board meetings, letters to the local paper, and a petition the site continued to operate from 1980 to 1985.

By 1985, over 50 truckloads a day of toxic waste were being dumped in Casmalia by a variety of generators. Respiratory diseases and other ailments began to surface among nearby residents and Casmalia Resources was identified as the likely cause of these health issues. The facility was temporarily shut down and cited for numerous violations, including the spraying of liquid toxic waste onto nearby hills to speed up the chemical evaporation process.

A public demonstration against the dump took place on August 12, 1985, as 70 townspeople blocked the entrance to the dump. The protest, reported by the Los Angeles Times, consisted of piling hay bales on the road to prevent trucks from delivering toxic waste shipments. Eleven people were arrested.

The Santa Barbara County Board of Supervisors voted 4–1 to increase the daily limit of truckloads of waste to 85, a significant expansion. Supervisor Toru Miyoshi was the lone vote against these plans. Miyoshi attended a rally in Casmalia at which a large group of residents traveled by caravan to a rally at the State Capitol, where they demanded Governor George Deukmejian close the dump.

State Health Director Kenneth Kizer, working with Deukmejian during this time, referred to Casmalia residents’ health concerns as "chemical superstition" and declined to investigate the alleged health problems caused by the dump. Kizer attended a meeting near Casmalia where protesters showed up to picket his appearance, including a group of high school students opposing the dump. Local student Bill Buck was quoted in an article in the San Luis Obispo County Telegram-Tribune saying that the health problems of Casmalia residents were indeed real and there had been "strange odors" at his school.

The Casmalia elementary school sent children home because of toxic fumes, according to school principal Ken McCalip. The San Francisco Examiner reported that a group of 72 local physicians had become concerned about health problems in the area, citing an abnormally high percentage of miscarriages, stillbirths and respiratory diseases. They attributed these health problems to the Casmalia Resources facility.

In the summer of 1988, the EPA held a public hearing in Santa Maria. About 300 people attended the meeting, including Congressman Robert Lagomarsino, who recommended the EPA deny permits for Casmalia Resources. Nick Irmiter, along with his young daughter Lina Irmiter, was a key leader towards the closing of the site.

The EPA discovered that dump operators were permitting a higher level of waste on-site than was permitted and the EPA levied a fine of $6.2 million. Casmalia Resources countered with a request to expand the facility, adding two large new landfills. As state and federal agencies were considering the dump’s future, another public hearing was held in Orcutt at which a large group of demonstrators engaged in an act of civil disobedience. The meeting’s disruption ended with the government panel’s decision to adjourn the meeting and permits for Casmalia Resources were not approved. The facility was subsequently shut down.

=== Closure and clean-up (1989–present) ===
After closure of the dump, the former Casmalia Resources property was managed by the Environmental Protection Agency. A large area surrounding the dump was found to have significant soil and groundwater contamination and Casmalia Resources was declared a Superfund site, the first in Santa Barbara County. Plans for containment of the site were put into place and a long-term management plan was approved.

A series of lawsuits were filed as the federal government began seeking settlements with the 10,000 generators who sent waste to Casmalia during its 16 years of operation. These settlements have helped cover the significant costs of cleanup and monitoring at the site, which will continue for decades.

== See also ==
- List of Superfund sites in California
- Kettleman Hills Hazardous Waste Facility
