= Omega Chemical Corporation =

- Superfund site
- Location within California
- Location: Whittier, Los Angeles County, California; 33°58′11″N 118°02′36″W

Information
- CERCLIS ID: CAD042245001
- Contaminants: PCE, TCE, Freon
- Responsible parties: Omega Chemical Site PRP Organized Group

Progress
- Proposed: September 29, 1998
- Listed: January 19, 1999

The Omega Chemical Corporation was a refrigerant and solvent recycling company that operated from 1976 to 1991 in Whittier, California. Due to improper waste handling and removal, the soil and groundwater beneath the property became contaminated and the area is now referred to as the Omega Chemical Superfund Site. Cleanup of the site began in 1995 with the removal of hazardous waste receptacles and a multimillion-dollar soil vaporization detoxifying system.

== History ==
The Omega Chemical Corporation processed hazardous wastes from refrigerants at their facilities to be recycled into commercial products. They primarily handled hydrocarbons and chlorofluorocarbons and stored the waste at their facilities in Whittier, California. Due to leakage and improper handling, transport, and storage practices, there has been contamination of groundwater and soil by volatile organic compounds (compounds that can easily evaporate in air), and other metals. Removal activities began under the supervision of the Environmental Protection Agency (EPA) in 1995 after thousands of drums of hazardous wastes, contaminated cylinders of up to 20,000 pounds, and hundreds of contaminated, empty drums were reported at the Omega site. A CERCLA administrative order was administered to the owner of the site to begin cleanup activities and the Omega Chemical Site PRP Organized Group was formed of potentially responsible parties to carry out the orders. Over 4,000 contaminated drums were removed from the property by this group and numerous soil and groundwater samples were evaluated for toxicity.

== Major Contaminants ==
=== Tetrachloroethylene (PCE) ===
Tetrachloroethylene is a chemical often found in dry cleaning and degreasing agents and has been determined by the Department of Health and Human Services to likely be a carcinogen.

=== Trichloroethylene (TCE) ===
Trichloroethylene is a chemical commonly used as a solvent for metal cleaning and has been shown to remain in groundwater for a long time if leaked. Drinking TCE-contaminated water for a long time may cause liver and kidney damage, impaired fetal development, and possible immune system impairment. Prolonged exposure may also cause cancer.

=== Freons ===
Freons are chemicals used as coolants in refrigerators and as a pressurizing agent in aerosols. The EPA reports that prolonged exposure to small amounts of Freon is unlikely to cause adverse health effects.

== Risks ==
While the majority of the Omega site is paved in concrete, direct contaminated soil contact at the site is a small risk, with the exception of exposure to construction workers who worked at the site. The greater risks lie in soil vapor exposure and groundwater contamination. Groundwater contamination is moving to the southwest from Whittier so drinking-water supply wells in the vicinity of the site and to the southwest are at risk of contamination. Multiple buildings near the site have also documented higher levels of toxic soil vapors.

== Cleanup Efforts ==
The EPA proposed a cleanup plan in 2009 in order to reduce vapor intrusion risk, direct exposure risk, and migration of contaminants further down-gradient and to deeper levels. To do this, they proposed the use of Soil vapor extraction wells that remove and treat toxic vapors from the soil above the water table to keep them from contaminating the groundwater.

== See also ==
- List of Superfund sites in California
