= Del Amo (Superfund site) =

Waste-disposal site in southern Los Angeles County

Coordinates: 33.8469°N 118.2936°W

The Del Amo Superfund Site is located in southern Los Angeles County between the cities of Torrance and Carson. It is a U.S. EPA Region 9 Superfund Site. The waste-disposal site of a rubber manufacturer is one of 94 Superfund Sites in California as of November 29, 2010.

== Site History ==
The Del Amo Superfund Site, located in southern Los Angeles County between the cities of Torrance and Carson, is an 280-acre (110 ha) site at the former location of a synthetic rubber manufacturing plant that was in operation from 1942 until the late 1960s or early 1970s. The facility was three separate plants: a styrene plant, a butadiene plant, and a synthetic rubber plant. Multiple companies leased and used the plants until 1955 when the Shell Chemical Company bought the plants and continued operations independently. In 1972, the site was sold to a developer that dismantled the plants, and it is now mostly an industrial park. The Environmental Protection Agency (EPA) recommended that the Del Amo site be added to the National Priorities List (NPL) in 1991. The earliest remediation efforts began in 1995 and are ongoing.

== Contamination ==
Most of the contamination is found in a 3.7-acre (1.5 ha) waste-disposal area near the southern end of the Del Amo site area, north of Del Amo Boulevard alley. The rubber manufacturer dumped waste materials into 6 unlined pits and 3 or 4 unlined shallow ponds. Contaminants include volatile aromatic hydrocarbons like benzene and ethylbenzene, and polycyclic aromatic hydrocarbons like naphthalene, benzopyrene, phenanthrene and chrysene. Benzene is known to be a human carcinogen, and is detected most frequently and at the greatest concentrations at the waste pits.

Shallow groundwater, soil, and soil gas in the area are known to be contaminated. Contamination of soil gas is a major concern because it can enter buildings that have been built over the site.

A 1993 report states that shallow groundwater in the area was contaminated but local drinking water wells were apparently unaffected at that time. Chemicals could be detected in water up to 60 feet below the surface, but drinking water in this area comes from deep reservoirs 500 feet below the surface and was therefore considered safe to drink. However, recent data from the EPA’s Second Five Year Review indicates that volatile contaminants were migrating from the soil to groundwater reservoirs including reservoirs that are used for domestic water. Groundwater in the area may also contain contaminants from the nearby Superfund site, Montrose Chemical Corporation. Past and current reports indicate that steps need to be taken to ensure that shallow groundwater contamination does not seep to deeper levels.

== Remediation ==
Remediation efforts include capping the waste area, installation of surface water controls, a soil vapor extraction and remediation facility, fencing, and long-term monitoring of the site. Contaminated soil and waste material from up to 25 meters depth was removed from one of the waste pits between 1982 and 1984. This material was taken to an appropriate disposal facility, and the excavated area was backfilled with clean soil. Contaminated soil likely exists beneath the backfill, based on samples collected later. Between 1994 and 1999 Shell Oil Company performed routine inspections of the area and secured the waste pits.

Cleanup is ongoing and concern remains that if the soil at the site is disturbed, volatile organic compounds (VOCs) could be released into the air. The dispersal of contaminants into deep groundwater aquifers also remains a concern.

== Public health ==
During cleanup of the site, 55 of the nearest homes were bought out. Soil around two of these homes was found to contain hazardous chemicals that did not come from the Del Amo site. Additionally, surface soil near some of the bought-out homes contained amounts of Del Amo chemicals that are too small to be considered harmful to peoples’ health.

Residents report that when they were children they played at or around the waste site and saw waste material on the ground, prior to the capping and fencing of the waste area. Past and current contact with contaminants likely occurred through inhalation, ingestion, and possibly direct skin contact, both to residents and workers.

A study from the late 1980s found higher than expected reported rates of skin, eye, nose and throat irritation and earaches, dizziness and fatigue. People who had these health issues lived closer to the site than those that did not. The same study found no higher rate of cancer, miscarriage, reproductive problems, or death among residents.

== See also ==
- List of Superfund sites in California
