= Koppers Co., Inc. Superfund Site =

Koppers Co., Inc.
- Superfund site
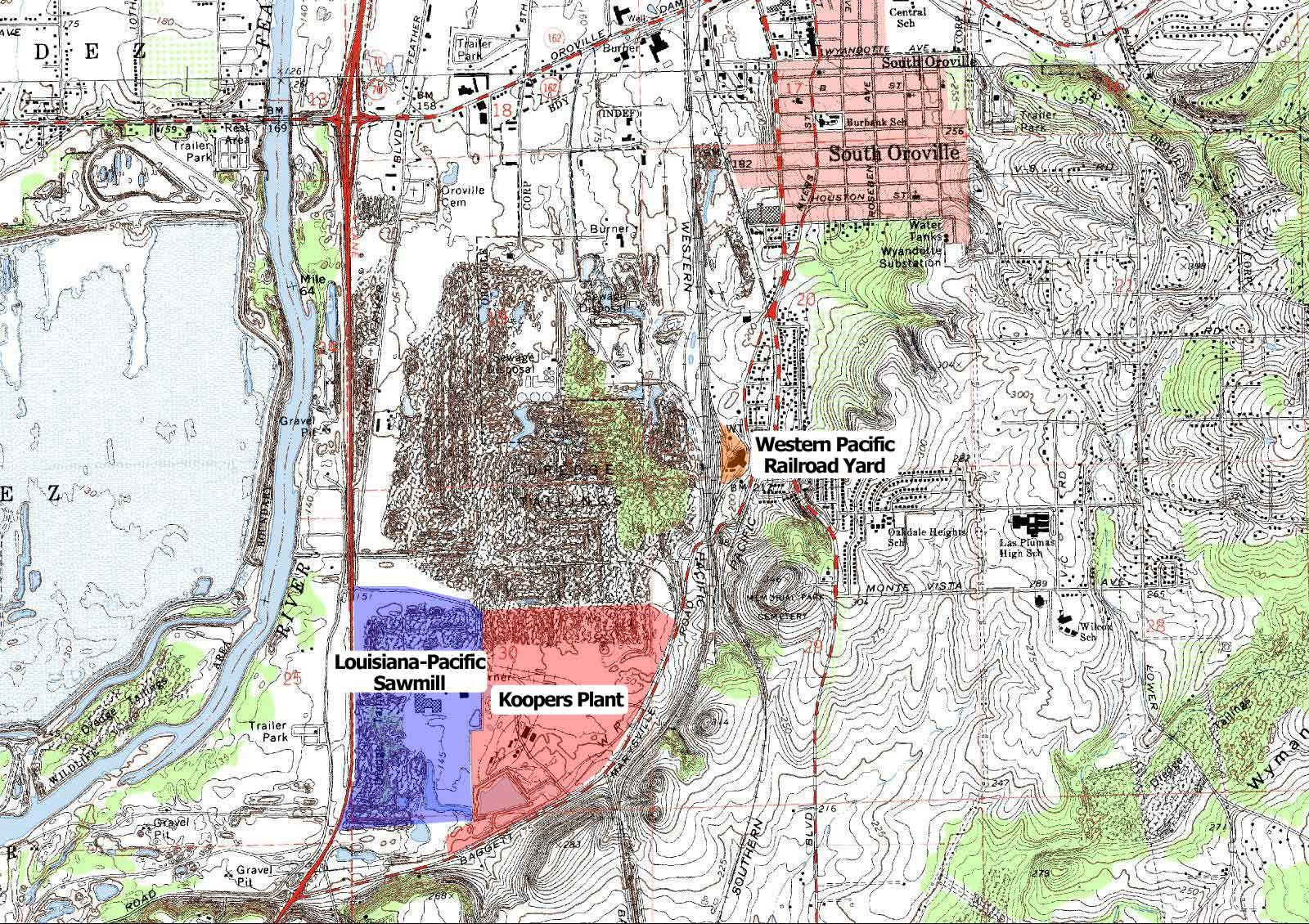

- Location within California
- Location: Oroville, Butte County, California; 39°31′00″N 121°33′00″W

Information
- CERCLIS ID: CAD009112087
- Contaminants: Pentachlorophenol; Dioxins; Dibenzofuran; Polycyclic aromatic hydrocarbon; Benzene; Copper; Arsenic; Chromium
- Responsible parties: Koppers Company Inc.; Beazer East, Inc.

Progress
- Proposed: 08 September 1983
- Listed: 21 September 1984

The Koppers Co., Inc. (KCI) Superfund Site is one of three Superfund sites in Oroville, California, along with Louisiana Pacific Sawmill and Western Pacific Railyard. The KCI Superfund Site is a 200-acre site which served as a wood treatment plant for 50 years. Wood was treated with many chemicals to prevent wood deterioration. The accumulation of these chemicals from spills, fires, and uses has caused this site to be contaminated with the hazardous waste material. Due to soil and groundwater contamination, the site was placed on the National Priorities List in 1984 for remedial action plans to clean up the site to protect surrounding residential areas concerning environmental and human health risks.

== Origins of the site ==
The KCI Superfund site was originally a mining operation in the 1900s. The Hutchinson Lumber Mill operated from 1920 to 1948. In 1955, Koppers Co., Inc. purchased the property from National Wood Treatment Company. Koppers later sold the company to Beazer East, Inc., which then later re-sold it to Koppers Industries, Inc. The company closed down the wood treatment facility in 2001. Beazer East, Inc. again bought out the company and sold the land with its contaminated soils into two landfills to Gold Line Express Inc. Beazer East Inc. is known to be the responsible party for the outcome of the site.

From 1948 to 2001, the Oroville Plant conducted the wood treatment operations to prevent wood from deteriorating. In 1963, an on-site fire released 20,000 gallons of pentachlorophenol (PCP) from tanks onto the soil. Another fire was documented in 1987 releasing high levels of dioxins. With many orders and remedial actions to clean up the site, KCI Superfund Site is under monitored recovery to clean the affected groundwater and soil contamination. The goal is to return the original source of groundwater to the 10,650 people living in the surrounding area.

== Environmental and health effects ==
The process of wood treatment requires many chemicals such as pentachlorophenol (PCP), dioxins, dibenzofuran, polycyclic aromatic hydrocarbons (PAH), and heavy metals such as copper, chromium, and arsenic. PCP was first discovered in groundwater and in nearby residential wells in 1971. The most abundant of these chemicals present at the superfund site is PCP. Long-term exposure to low levels of PCP, through soil exposure or water exposure, can lead to carcinogenic, renal, and neurological effects. The Environmental Protection Agency's maximum contaminant level in water is 1 parts per billion (ppb). Some wells most recently measured at the site in 2007 still had concentrations of PCP above 15 ppb.

All of these hazardous chemicals can cause liver damage, reproductive effects, neurobehavioral effects, immunotoxic effects, and developmental effects. Orders for cleanup were issued two years after PCP was first discovered and no serious human effects were reported. Many preventive actions have been implemented from the state and federal districts. From 1984 to 1986, bottled water was supplied to residential areas whose drinking supply was impacted. Thirty-four private residences were also connected with alternate water supply from the Oroville-Wyandotte Irrigation District. As of 2008, of those initial thirty-four residences, seven are still supplied the alternate water supply, compensated by Beazer East Inc. for their annual water bill. Groundwater has been monitored since 1985 for on and off sites. The site has been under surveillance, and federal intervention has kept many further human health risks from escalating.

== National and state intervention ==
In 1973, the Regional Water Quality Control Board (RWQCB) first discovered PCP in nearby ground-water wells used as a source of residential drinking water. The control board issued several orders from 1973 to 1982 for cleanup of all contaminated groundwater, installation of groundwater recovery wells, and construction of wastewater treatment processes to end the use of unlined ponds and excavation of debris from the site 1963 fire. Koppers installed two recovery wells to recover PCP from local groundwater in accordance with the RWQCB. The RWQCB order was retracted after PCP concentrations decreased in off-site wells in 1974. However, in 1982, Koppers was issued a cease-and-desist order by the RWQCB to end the discharge of PCP into soil and ground water at the wood treatment plant and ordered a plan for mitigating the source, future prevention of chemical contamination, and remediation of contaminants.

The EPA created the National Priorities List in 1982 to identify and prioritize hazardous waste sites and facilities that warrant remedial actions. On September 8, 1983, the site was first proposed for placement on the National Priorities List. The site was designated as a Superfund site on September 21, 1984. Groundwater monitoring was initiated in September 1984, and then in June 1985, the use of PCP in wood treatment was phased out. In April 1987, the EPA issued a unilateral removal order to conduct the cleanup, removal of contaminated soil. A temporary chip-seal cap was constructed in order to stop leaking of contaminants through the soil and into the groundwater. In May 1989 a record of decision for cleanup of groundwater and soil was issued for the site. Four specified soil units were removed and landfilled. Extraction wells and treatment plants were installed to treat contaminated groundwater by carbon adsorption for both on and off-property sites. In March 1993 groundwater remediation began. Treatment of groundwater was augmented to include bioremediation to treat PCP. Contaminated soil removal began in 1995 and completed in 2002. The second five-year review was completed in February 2003. The remedial actions were deemed protective and was stated in the third five-year report released in 2008. The next five-year review was expected to be released in July 2013. The site is still on the National Priorities List due to contaminated groundwater. The estimated date of cleanup completion and removal from the National Priorities List is September 2025.

== Future uses ==
In 2019, the KCI Superfund site was considered for a potential scrapyard for debris from the Camp Fire in nearby Paradise. The site would take in and process between 250 and 400 truckloads of non-toxic concrete and metal per day. Oroville residents raised concern with the proposal, believing the activity would kick up toxic dust and damage local roadways.

== See also ==
- Environmental remediation
- EPA
- Superfund
- Koppers
- Oroville, California
- List of Superfund sites in California
