= The Stoker Company =

The Stoker Company is a producer and applier of pesticides and a crop dusting loading facility, located in Imperial County, California, approximately 25 miles from the Mexican border. It is currently listed as a Superfund site because pesticides developed and used there are considered a human health hazard due to long-term exposure that may cause adverse health effects. Beginning in 1966, operations have caused on-site and off-site pesticide contamination to surface soil, water, and air.

== History ==
Stoker Company has supplied and applied pesticides since May 26, 1966. The Stoker Company sells, stores and applies pesticides using aircraft and ground equipment over a 26-acre site. Runoff from the cleaning of aircraft goes to underground concrete sumps located under each wash rack. Approximately once a week, the pesticide waters are pumped from the sumps into a mobile spray rig and sprayed onto a 15–20-acre plot on the Stoker site consisting of a dirt road leading to the airstrip. During the 1960s and 1970s, Stoker released approximately 300 gallons of waste water per day, but the California Regional Water Quality Control Board recently estimated that this was reduced to 100 gallons. The wash water has been determined to be non-hazardous.

On May 9, 1988, a pond located at a nearby residence near the site suffered a fish and bird kill. Numerous dead fish (shad and catfish) and ten dead birds (Snowy Egrets) were found around the perimeter of the pond. Upon necropsy, the California Department of Fish and Game (CDFG) determined the fish tissue was contaminated by high levels of several different pesticides. The CDFG analyzed the pond and concluded that high winds blew pesticides from the Stoker airplane cleaning activities into the pond. After the discovery of dead birds and fish, the pond was closed to public activities due to the belief of contamination. Later in 1988, an on-site warehouse that contained pesticide supplies caught fire and burned to the ground. The fire started in the east end of the warehouse where sulfur and diatomaceous clays were stored. To avoid health risks, businesses and residences within a 2-mile radius were evacuated. During the fire, approximately 300 tons of soil were contaminated and later disposed of in a landfill regulated under the Resource Conservation and Recovery Act (RCRA).

Throughout 1988 to 1989, the United States Environmental Protection Agency (EPA) investigations found numerous pesticides in on-site soil, the nearby canal and pond, and air measurements. Later in 1989, Stoker submitted a closure plan for the land treatment unit. Stoker later reconsidered these actions and still continues to spray wash waters on-site. In July 1991, EPA placed the Stoker Company site on the National Priorities List of hazardous waste sites after testing showed that the disposal of pesticides on-site was contaminating on-site surface soil, which was then being relocated to off-site air, soil, and surface water. In 1993, the EPA reevaluated the site and determined that they did not need to perform further actions during that time.

== Contaminants ==
Agricultural pesticide use near populated areas is increasing worldwide due to population growth into formerly rural farmland. The Stoker Company is located on 26 acres of barren land with no vegetation. Some of the contaminated soil has blown off-site and affected nearby surface soil and surface water.

Twenty different pesticides were detected in on-site soil surface samples including diazinon, endosulfan and heptachlor epoxide, which were found at highest levels in the burn area, and disulfoton, endosulfan, merphos, and methamidophos which were found in high concentrations near the former warehouse and office. The concentrations of listed pesticides were all significantly above comparison values and therefore of concern for human and environmental health. On-site groundwater was reported to contain low levels of butyric acid, dinoseb, and endosulfan due to leaching. Only endosulfan concentrations were significantly above comparison values. On-site air analyses also found eight different pesticides at levels significantly above background levels. The eight pesticides were dacthal, diainon, endosulfan, malathion, mevinphos, maled, methyl parathion, and phorate. However, these concentrations were not enough in comparison to raise concern. Lastly, dead fish samples found in the pond contained dacthal (27.3 mg/kg), DDE (0.11 mg/kg), diazinon (0.1 mg/kg), and endosulfan (0.92 mg/kg).

== Health Impacts ==
There is increasing public concern regarding the health risks associated with residential exposure to agricultural pesticides, but limited understanding about the potential for such exposures. Pesticides are toxic chemicals and can therefore pose a threat to humans from inadvertent exposure. After the evaluation by the EPA, the momentum that brought the Stoker site to the federal government soon decreased once there was a lack of evidence that directly connected the company to major widespread environmental and health impacts.

The impacted populations include on-site workers, the family formerly living on the neighboring D&K property, the D&K Duck Hunting members, individuals using untreated water, and individuals living near the crop dusting operations. Approximately 130 people live within 1 mile of the site, 400 people work in five neighboring businesses, and 45 workers are employed by Stoker Company. Four residences are located within one mile of the site, with the nearest family living one-half mile from Stoker Company. From 1983 to 1989, a family lived in a mobile home on the D&K property, which is around 80 feet from Stoker.

Long term exposure to the contaminants through incidental ingestion and skin absorption at the Stoker site may cause non-cancer adverse effects. However, the ingestion of contaminated fish is not thought to have resulted in significant risk of developing cancer. D&K club members have not reported apparent health hazards due to the ingestion of contaminated fish or incidental ingestion. Additionally, other individuals who may have drunk the water or lived near the crop dusting operations do not seem to be showing health impacts. However, it is not possible to evaluate the risks from periodic or long-term exposure from pesticide spray drift from Stoker airplanes due to lack of information. Furthermore, there is a large body of unknown information due to the absence of monitoring data.

The EPA identified three different sources for contamination: 1) the land disposal of rinse water; 2) the burn area at the southern end of the airstrip; 3) the warehouse fire of 1988. The residents living in the mobile home on the D&K property reported a variety of symptoms experienced by the family members. However, the actual health effects that are occurring are unknown due to lack of knowledge of exposure levels. Additionally, the Toxic Chemical Release Inventory contains no record of environmental releases from any industrial facility in Imperial, including Stoker Company. Overall, it is not possible to assess the risks and implications of the effects of contaminants in areas located around the Stoker Company.
