= Lava Cap Mine =

Gold mine in Nevada County, California, United States

The Lava Cap Mine is an abandoned gold mine in Nevada County, California. The mine is located 5 miles (8.0 km) southeast of Nevada City. The site is undergoing consideration to be designated a National Historical Landmark

== History ==
Gold mining at the Lava Cap Mine began 1861, with an inactive period from 1918 to 1934 When renewed interest in the Sierra Nevada’s deep-vein deposits led to large-scale hard-rock operations. Unlike the placer miners of the Gold Rush era, these enterprises relied on advanced engineering, heavy equipment, and significant financial investment. The Lava Cap property developed into one of the region’s most productive lode mines, with substantial underground workings, ore bins, and a milling complex that processed gold-bearing quartz.

By the 1930s, the mine was operating with modern flotation and cyanide recovery systems, employing dozens of miners, mill workers, and engineers. Payroll and assay records from this period document consistent production and regional economic importance. The site’s infrastructure—including its shafts, adits, tramways, and mill foundations—illustrates the industrial layout typical of successful Sierra Nevada gold mines of the period.

Operations slowed during the 1940s as wartime restrictions and declining ore values reduced profitability. Following the cessation of mining activity, the property remained largely undisturbed, leaving behind the physical evidence of its productive years.

== Toxic Contamination Events ==
In 1979, after complaints from nearby residents, California’s Central Valley Regional Water Quality Control Board (RWQCB) issued a Cleanup and Abatement Order (CAO), to mitigate toxic runoff from the property and improve the dam onsite. While actions were taken to mitigate toxic runoff, no improvements were made to the dam.

In 1997, after a heavy storm, the dam broke and 10,000 cubic yards of toxic tailings flowed into Little Clipper Creek, leading to tailings found in that creek, along the shore of Lost Lake, and in nearby wetlands. Arsenic was additionally found in the drinking water of nearby residents.

As part of the cleanup, the EPA distributed water filters to impacted residents and removed 4,000 cubic yards of tailings from the dam and removed additional tailings and contaminated soil from Little Clipper Creek, capping it and routing water around it. The EPA’s cleanup occurred from 1996 to 2005 and cost $8 million, with revegetation of Little Clipper Creek beginning in 2007. The property owner additionally constructed a drainage ditch that partially routed water away from the tailings.
