= Brown & Bryant =

Coordinates: 35.2028°N 118.8231°W

Brown & Bryant Inc. was a chemical distribution company located in Arvin, California in Kern County. The land the company operated on is designated as a U.S. Environmental Protection Agency (EPA) Superfund cleanup site. The company was a formulator of agricultural chemicals including fertilizers, herbicides, insecticides, and fumigants.

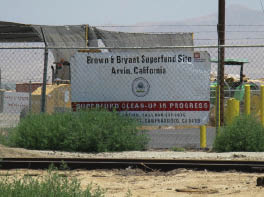
Perimeter of the Brown & Bryant Superfund site in Arvin, CA

Brown & Bryant operated from the 1960s until 1989. The company stored and distributed various chemicals on the site, including the herbicide dinoseb, which was sold by Dow Chemicals, and the pesticides D-D and Nemagon, both sold by Shell Oil Company. During its years of operation in Arvin, there were numerous chemical spills, equipment failures, and leaks that led to many of the chemicals seeping into the soil and upper levels of the groundwater. In 1979, an evaporation pond was built onto the site. On at least two occasions under heavy rainfall the pond received pesticide rinse water and surface runoff from the site. In 1989 the company went out of business and ceased all operations.

Investigation of the Site in the 1980s by both the California Department of Toxic Substances Control and the United States Environmental Protection Agency (EPA) showed significant contamination of the soil and groundwater. The nearest public well in Arvin is located about 1,700 ft. south and down gradient of the operating site. The public water system in Arvin supplies drinking water to approximately 7,800 people and irrigates about 19,600 acres of surrounding cropland.

In 1988, as ordered by the State, Brown & Bryant excavated heavily contaminated soil underneath their pond and installed a liner. The removed soil was then cleaned and treated and returned to the ground using an innovate technology called ultraviolet/ozone. In 1989, the EPA's emergency response program began to evaluate the need to conduct removal action at the site; and Brown & Bryant Inc. was placed on the Superfund List. The following year the EPA began to look into and develop long-term solutions to the groundwater and soil contamination problems at the site. EPA decided to consolidate the contaminated soil, install a cap over this consolidated soil, and extract and treat water from the first water bearing unit. To remediate the groundwater EPA planned to extract and treat groundwater in the A-zone, which was the source of contamination to the B-zone.

== Supreme Court Decision ==
Following Brown & Bryant's closure in 1989 the EPA and the State undertook the cleanup efforts at the site and looked to apportion some of the costs onto two railroad companies who had leased the land to Brown & Bryant. The United States sued both the Union Pacific Railroad and the Burlington Northern & Santa Fe Railing Company (BNSF), under the "Superfund Law" or the Environmental Response, Compensation and Liability Act (CERCLA). Before the Supreme Court decision, they settled with the EPA to pay nearly $1 million for cleanup costs. The Supreme Court ruled that the railroad companies were to pay nine percent of the total cost of cleanup.

The United States also sued Shell because they had delivered the chemical products to the Brown & Bryant site. Shell Oil Company maintained that it was not responsible for the cleanup and the Supreme Court ruled in their favor, clearing them of having to share the cost of cleaning up the toxic site.

== See also ==
- List of Superfund sites in California
- Arvin, California
