= The Waste Disposal Inc. Superfund site =

Waste disposal

Coordinates: 33.94975°N 118.05642°W

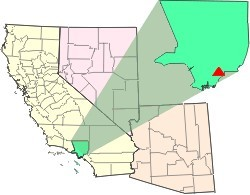

The Waste Disposal Inc. Superfund site is an oil-related contaminated site in the highly industrialized city of Santa Fe Springs in Los Angeles County, California. It is approximately 38 acres (15 ha), with St Paul's high school immediately adjacent to the northeast corner of the site. Approximately 15,000 residents of Santa Fe Springs obtain drinking water from wells within three miles (4.8 km) of the site.

== History ==
With a capacity of 42 million US gallons (160,000,000 L) and a diameter of approximately 600 feet (200 m), the site was originally constructed to be an in-ground and concrete-lined reservoir to store crude petroleum before 1924. By 1929, the Santa Fe Springs oil field was the nation's largest producer of petroleum products. The booming oil production generated a large amount of hazardous oil byproducts in both liquid and solid form. The site was later used to store a variety of liquid and solid wastes, because Waste Disposal Inc. (WDI) received a permit from Los Angeles County to operate an industrial waste landfill, which continued until 1964. Wastes disposed at the site included oil drilling muds, construction debris, refinery waste, sludge, chemical solvent and other petroleum-related chemicals.

In July 1987, the WDI site was placed on the National Priorities List (NPL) for known or threatened releases of hazardous substances, pollutants or contaminants. On November 11, 1988, the Agency for Toxic Substances and Disease Registry (ATSDR) released a preliminary health assessment of the WDI site and determined it to be a public health concern due to the public exposure to contaminant soil and potential groundwater quality issues.

An Endangered Assessment published by the Environmental Protection Agency (EPA) in 1989 evaluated the on-site risk of residents with respect to contaminated soil contact or migrating contaminant inhalation. The non-carcinogenic hazard was considered unacceptable for residents contacting soil, and required remedial actions. Contaminants in the soil include 11 metals, 7 chlorinated pesticides, 16 volatile organic compounds (VOCs), polyaromatic hydrocarbons (PAHs), and polychlorinated biphenyls (PCBs). The Superfund or Comprehensive Environmental Response, Compensation, and Liability Act (CERCLA) required remediation actions for the presence of those contaminations in the soil, soil gas and groundwater.

Based on the results of an initial Remedial Investigation (RI) report in 1990 and a Feasibility Study (FS) in 1993, the EPA selected environmental remedies to address contaminated soil and subsurface gas at the site. In 2003, the U.S. Department of Justice and the EPA with the U.S. District Court in Los Angeles required 17 companies, known as the WDI Group, to clean up the WDI Superfund site.

== Health concerns in the community ==
In July 1958, the community around the site formed a group against WDI operations due to health concerns. Foul odor emission was the primary problem and was related to other health issues of residents. Excessive noise and dust were also related to the site by local officials. A cancer surveillance program by the University of Southern California did not show an elevated cancer rate in the area. The EPA's RI report is the most recent and extensive investigation to date, and the site characteristics are based primarily on its findings. The Final RI report of November 1989 contains a detailed description and analysis of contaminants found at the site. The contamination on-site at WDI exists in the soil, groundwater, and subsurface gases. Methane is the most prevalent subsurface gas and shown the highest concentrations in the reservoir area. Volatile Organic Compounds (VOCs) are also found in the subsurface gas. VOCs and several metals with concentrations above Maximum Contaminant Levels (MCLs) are found in groundwater. The primary on-site soil contamination includes the drilling muds and field wastes. The constituents of these wastes include:

- Metals - arsenic, beryllium, thallium, and lead
- VOCs - toluene, methylene chloride, acetone, ethylbenzene, 2-butanone, and xylene
- Semivolatile Organic Compounds - benzo(a)pyrene, 2-chlorophenol, naphthalene, 2-methylnaphthalene, 4-nitrophenol, phenanthrene, chrysene, 1,4-dichlorobenzene, benzo(a)anthracene, anthracene, pyrene, phenanthrene, pentachlorophenol, and fluorene
- Pesticides - DDD, DDE, DDT, alpha- and gamma-chlordane, and dieldrin in surface soils
- PCBs in the surface soils

Under current conditions, possible exposure pathways consist of dermal contact with contaminated surface soils and inhalation of particles and volatiles. The highest risks are posed by arsenic, thallium, benzene, pesticides, PCBs, and vinyl chloride. Even though these risks for current exposure scenarios are almost within EPA's acceptable range, they can still pose threats to future users of the site.

In addition, a health concern survey was conducted among residents in 1999 by the California Department of Health Services (CDHS) showing a consistent concern about odor of the site and human exposure, particularly St. Paul's students. CDHS determined that the WDI site should not be a major health concern even to the children playing at the field right next to the site.

== Remedy application ==
Remedial construction by WDI contractors started in March 2004. Meanwhile, the EPA also contracted the US Army Corps of Engineers to provide supervision of the construction. The remedy functions to keep contaminants on site, block the migration of contamination through rainwater, air, and groundwater, and restrict direct human contacts with the contaminated soil. The goal is to protect individuals and environment from getting exposure to contamination, rather than to implement treatments to the on-site contaminants. EPA decides that the selected remedy will remain protective for the human health and environment in the long-term. The estimated cost of this protective remedy is approximately $5,170,000. EPA considers the cost reasonable for the risk reduction and believes the remedy will significantly reduce the risks by preventing the migration of contaminants.

Treatments of the contaminated site recommended by the US EPA in 1993 are summarized as follows:

- Excavation and re-compaction of contaminated soil
- Multi-layer engineered cap over the reservoir and selected location outside of reservoir
- Groundwater contamination was not likely a public health concern but requires long-term monitoring to ensure drinking water safety.
- Leachate and free liquid collection for offsite treatment
- Institutional controls including access controls and use restrictions over time
- Physical barriers or venting systems in nearby buildings
- Long term operations and maintenance to ensure efficacy.

In the five-year review issued in August 2009, the EPA determined that the remedial actions have successfully contained on-site waste and blocked exposure pathways. The second five-year review report issued in September 2014 also stated that the remedy remains protective. The remedy is also effective in preventing direct exposure to contaminated soils. The next five-year review is scheduled to be released at 2019, since waste is left on site and WDI does not allow for unlimited use and unrestricted exposure.
