= Laboratory for Energy-Related Health Research Superfund Site =

Superfund Site located at UCD

Coordinates: 38.5187°N 121.7512°W

The Laboratory for Energy-Related Health Research Superfund Site encompasses a 25-acre area, including a former research facility that studied the impact of radiation on beagle dogs, and its adjacent landfill, at the University of California, Davis (UCD). University researchers began studying the possible effects of radiation from nuclear fallout in the 1950s, under an agreement with the unit of the United States Department of Defense that had overseen the Manhattan Project. As a result, the site became contaminated with toxic chemicals and dangerous metals such as strontium-90 and hexavalent chromium.

In 2018, UC Davis reached a settlement with the Environmental Protection Agency (EPA), agreeing to spend $14 million to clean up the toxic landfill. Currently, the site is undergoing cleanup processes by the Comprehensive Environmental Response, Compensation, and Liability Act of 1980 (CERCLA, also known as Superfund). Site cleanup was jointly operated by the Department of Energy (USDOE) and the UCD, under an agreement negotiated among the EPA, the California Department of Toxic Substances Control, and the University of California.

== History ==
The superfund site is situated approximately 1.5 mi (2.4 km) south of the UCD campus in Solano County, California. Research sponsored by the U.S. Department of Energy at the site commenced in the 1950s, with full-scale operations beginning in 1958, focusing on chronic, low-level exposure of skeletal structures to beta particle irradiation from bone-seeking radionuclides, strontium-90 and Radium-226. Over 1000 beagles were used as test subjects. Subsequent expansions led to the establishment of new laboratories on site, including a cobalt-60 irradiation field.

Additionally, the site comprises three former landfills for UCD campus waste, waste disposal trenches and pits, and a chemical dispensing area. In 1988, the Department of Energy's Environment Survey Preliminary Report pointed out several chronic environmental issues at the site. Consequently, in 1989, the department terminated the project.

In the 1990s, remains of 800 beagles that had been irradiated were removed from the site, along with toxic dog waste and gravel. The radioactive materials were then sent to a nuclear disposal facility in Washington state.

== Environmental impacts and contaminants ==
Various types of contaminants have been identified at the superfund site, with potential contamination of the local water sources through leaching from the contaminated soil, including groundwater and Putah River, which collects runoffs from the UCD area. Eating fish from the Putah River and drinking water from nearby wells are two potential exposures of the contaminants to the residents.

The primary contaminants identified by UCD include Chloroform, Hexavalent Chromium, and Nitrate. Chloroform, from the group of volatile organic compound, has infiltrated the shallowest aquifer. Hexavalent Chromium has also been detected in shallow groundwater, though it is currently not used for drinking purposes. Nitrate levels have been detected in on-site wells, already stabilized. Many carcinogens, endocrine disruptors, and neurotoxic substances have also been identified on-site, including 1,2,3-trichloropropane, 1,2-dichloropropane, 1,4-dioxane, Indeno(1,2,3-cd)pyrene, Radium-226, Dieldrin, Strontium-90, Silver, and Mercury, etc.

== Remediation ==
Both the Department of Energy and UCD share responsibility for the cleanup of the site, with significant progress achieved since its designation as a Superfund site in 1994. All structures have undergone decontamination and decommissioning, and the majority of contaminated soil and debris have been treated and removed by Department of Energy. UCD has implemented multiple facilities to enhance the drainage system and mitigate further leaching of contaminants from the soil. Both organizations are continuing to evaluate the groundwater at the site. The anticipated cleanup completion is September 2024 for sitewide reuse.
