= Blue Ledge Mine =

Inactive copper mine in Siskiyou County, California, U.S.

- Superfund site
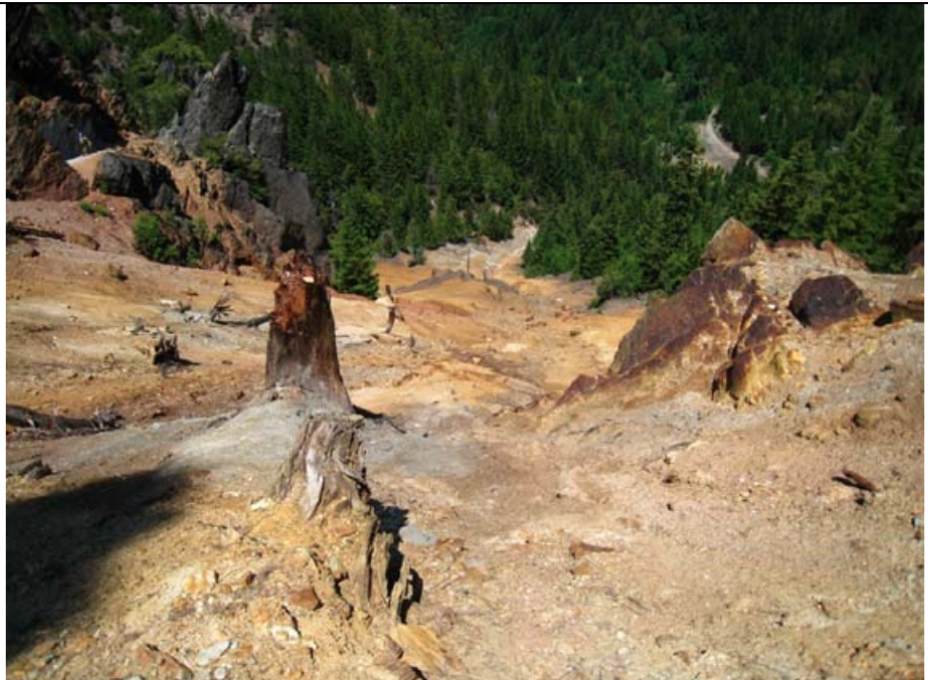
- Main waste rock pile

- Location within California
- Location: Siskiyou County, California; 41°57′35.5″N 123°6′27.8″W

Information
- CERCLIS ID: CAN000906063
- Contaminants: Sulfuric acid, cadmium, copper, lead, arsenic, zinc
- Responsible parties: ASARCO, Inc.

Progress
- Proposed: October 3, 2011

The Blue Ledge Mine is an inactive underground copper mine that has been classified as a Superfund Site by the Environmental Protection Agency (EPA) due to high concentrations of heavy metals. The mine is located approximately 3 miles south of the California–Oregon border in the Rogue River-Siskiyou National Forest. It is within the Siskiyou Mountain range, and sits near a summit at about 4,800 feet above sea level. The underground mining excavations span over 2 miles, and it is one of the largest mining operations to have existed in the region.

== Background ==
The Blue Ledge Mine was discovered in 1898 by three miners that were panning for gold in Joe Creek. Mining operations began in 1905 when demand for copper was increased during World War I. The mine produced 9,000 tons of high-grade ore between 1917 and 1920. The high-grade sulfide ore was hand sorted at the mine and taken by tram to the bottom of the mountain. It was then taken by wagon to Rogue Valley and shipped to Tacoma, Washington for smelting. After about a decade of inactivity, the mine produced an additional 2,600 tons of ore in 1930, and then production ceased permanently.

== Mining waste and contamination ==
While the Blue Ledge Mine was in production it had a waste-to-ore ration of 6USDA, and contains an estimated >70,000 tons of waste rock lying on steep hillsides and narrow drainage pathways. The waste rock is distributed in 4 discrete piles, with the deepest pile estimated at 30 feet deep. Mines that exploit mineralized sulfide deposits release sulfuric acid and dissolved metals in a process called acid mine drainage (AMD). The waste rock and sulfide deposits provide a continuous source of AMD that can be harmful to the biological organisms in the surrounding area, including humans.

AMD is formed by weathering that oxidizes sulfur minerals to sulfate and acid, and this process is exacerbated by microbes that oxidize reduced minerals. The production of acid, including sulfuric acid, causes metals to leach from waste rock into water and has contaminated nearby Joe Creek with cadmium, copper, lead, arsenic and zinc at levels that are toxic to aquatic life. Joe Creek is unable to contain any self-sustaining populations of fish due to the mining waste. The waste at Blue Ledge is particularly hazardous because it is mainly composed of small particles, which have greatly increased surface area when compared to large rocks, and therefore a high rate of metal leaching.

== Waste removal ==
In 2006, the Environmental Protection Agency (EPA) authorized the use of $484,302 in "total response costs to mitigate threats to human health and the environment posed by the presence of hazardous mine wastes at the Blue Ledge Mine Site...". The high levels of contamination deemed the site eligible for Time-Critical Removal Action (TCRA) which was carried out by the EPA.

The goals for short-term mitigation detailed in the TCRA included relocating waste rock from major drainage channels, creating an open limestone drainage channel, and building a log dam to retain waste rock. After those projects were completed, long-term solutions, termed Non-Time Critical Removal Action (NTCRA), were put in place. The long-term mitigation included reconditioning haul roads, constructing a permanent waste repository, consolidating waste rock from the four waste rock piles, reclaiming the site as a wildlife habitat, and capping the repository.

The long-term storage repository was constructed by the contractor Engineering/Remediation Resources Group in 2010. It is located below the surface at the Blue Ledge Mine. It was lined with high-density polyethylene, which was covered with gravel for drainage, and a clean soil cushion to prevent punctures. After placing all waste rock in the repository, it was covered with soil, gravel, a linear low-density polyethylene cover, and an additional 3 feet of cover soil.

== Gallery ==
Blue Ledge Mine and surroundings
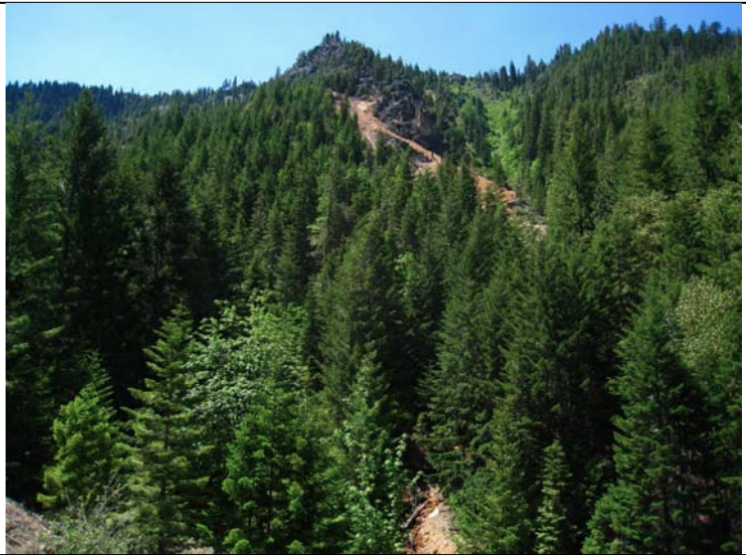
View of the Blue Ledge Mine

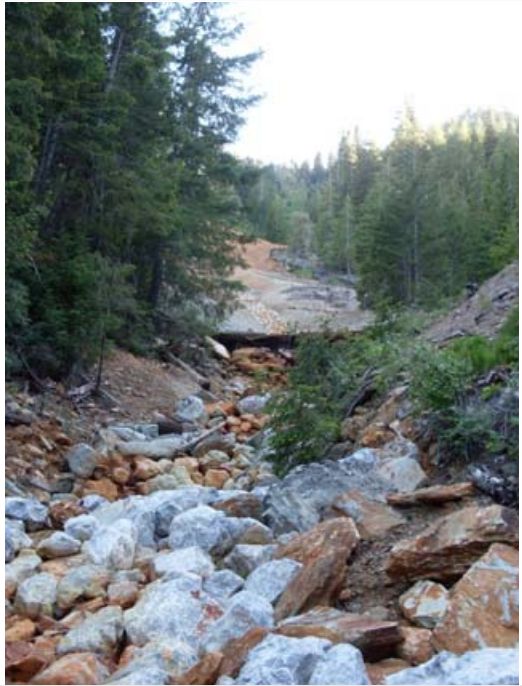
Second largest waste rock pile at the mine

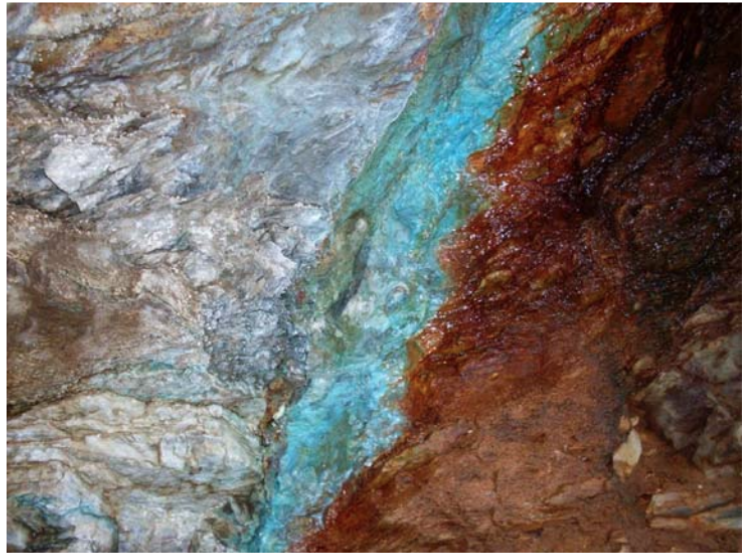
Rocks at the mine showing mineralization

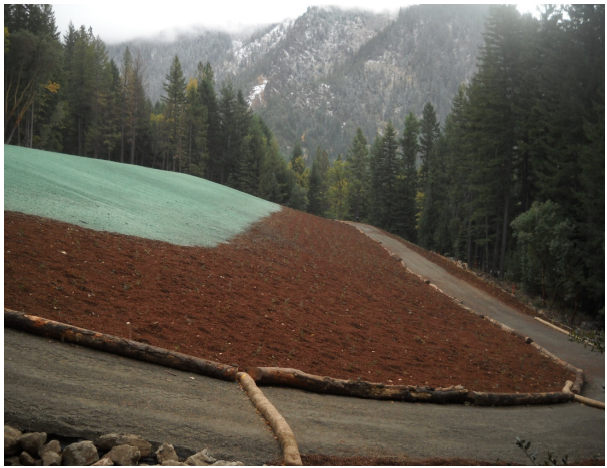
Completed repository

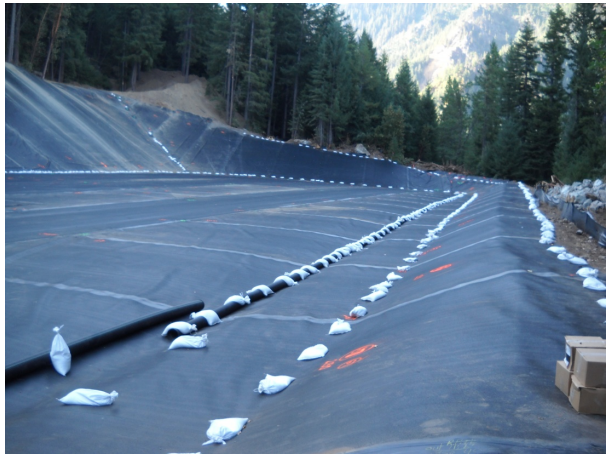
High density polyethylene lining in the repository
