= T.H. Agriculture & Nutrition Co. =

Was an American chemical company

T.H. Agriculture & Nutrition Company (THAN) was a California chemical company. It operated a pesticide-formulating facility from 1962 until 1981, and is now a Superfund site. Other companies formulated pesticides on the site from 1950 to 1962. During the 1950s and 1960s, on-site landfills were used for disposal of wastes generated from site operations, including pesticides from cleaning equipment. Waste was spilled on the surface of the site and left in piles on the ground. Sampling at the site conducted by the California Department of Health Services (CDHS) detected pesticides in soil and groundwater. The site was listed on the Superfund National Priorities List in 1986.

Cleanup activities at the site were completed in 2003 and included soil vapor extraction; demolition and removal of various structures; excavation and management of impacted soils; construction of a low-permeability containment cover to minimize the potential for movement of residual chemicals from Site soils to other media; implementation of access controls and land use restrictions; demonstration and maintenance of appropriate financial assurances; monitored natural attenuation of groundwater; provision of as-needed alternative drinking water supplies; and performance of ongoing operation, maintenance, and monitoring activities. Approximately 30,000 people live within 3 miles of the site, with the closest resident being 500 feet from the site. Approximately 35,000 people depend on groundwater as a source of drinking water.

== Clean up ==
Cleanup activities at the site began in 1981 and were completed in 2003 and included soil vapor extraction; demolition and removal of various structures; excavation and management of impacted soils; construction of a low-permeability containment cover to minimize the potential for movement of residual chemicals from Site soils to other media; implementation of access controls and land use restrictions; demonstration and maintenance of appropriate financial assurances; monitored natural attenuation of groundwater; provision of as-needed alternative drinking water supplies; and performance of ongoing operation, maintenance, and monitoring activities. The remedy for the site has been implemented, and the site was delisted in 2006 from the EPA's site.
