= Atlas Asbestos Mine Superfund Site =

Former mine in Fresno County, California

Coordinates: 36°14′02.6″N 120°33′17.8″W

- Interactive map of Atlas Asbestos Mine Superfund Site

Location
- Location: Fresno County, California, United States

History
- Closed: 1979

The Atlas Asbestos Mine Superfund Site is located within the Clear Creek Management Area near Fresno County, eighteen miles northwest of Coalinga, California. The mine started operating in 1963, covering 435 acres of a large naturally occurring asbestos deposit. The mine closed in 1979 and was placed in the EPA's National Priorities List (NPL) in 1983 due to the pollution of asbestos in the surrounding soil, air and water creating potential health hazards for local populations and environment.

== Pollution ==
The pollution from the Atlas asbestos mine is generated by three open pit asbestos mines, an abandoned mill building, a settling pond and debris. The contaminants are drained into Los Gatos Creek (a tributary to the Ponding Basin). During floods a detention basin would store the asbestos laden water preventing it from reaching the California Aqueduct; however, over time the build-up of sediments reduce the storage capacity of the basin allowing asbestos fibers to enter the aqueduct. It was not until 1980 that the metropolitan water district (MWD) of southern California measured elevated levels of asbestos in the water that reached 2500 million fibers per liter. In 2004, the Department of Water Resources decided to take action and enlarged the detention basin to store more water and prevent further contamination of asbestos fibers in the aqueduct.

Asbestos fibers can also be found in air and soils which can endanger the lives of people in the region. They can be released into the air and soil through two ways, human activity and rock weathering processes. When the EPA conducted a sampling of airborne asbestos in 1987 in Coalinga they found that there was 1-50% of Chrystolite asbestos, when they sampled soil they found less than 1 to 98% of soil in the area was contaminated. The soil near the city of Coalinga also found traces of chromium and nickel.

== Remediation ==
The EPA began initial investigations of the site in 1984 in order to determine the best course of action in minimizing harm of human health and protecting the environment.

In 1991, The EPA finished assessing the asbestos contamination in the surface of the mine site. It was established that they would approach the cleanup process in two OU's (Operating Units), which are focused study areas in which specific actions are taken in order to address the different hazards caused by asbestos contamination. These two OU's are the Atlas Asbestos Mine OU and the City of Coalinga OU, which together consist of the cleanup process of the whole Atlas Asbestos Mine Superfund Site.

The Atlas Asbestos Mine OU was focused on cleanup of surface asbestos and mining tailings at the site of the mine itself. Methods of remediation consisted mainly of building diversions to prevent streams from flowing through asbestos contaminated sites and mining tailing, thus minimizing the amount of asbestos eroding and contaminating water sources. In addition, sediment trapping dams were built and slope stabilizers were implemented on waste piles. Fences were built to limit access to the area. The primary cleanup processes and construction involved in remediation occurred between 1994 and 1996. Since the primary cleanup process, a re-vegetation pilot study has been conducted in 1999, and the Five Year Report in 2001 showed signs of erosion in the access road to the site. Thus a new route was suggested to be explored.

Another issue that arose from asbestos contamination was the potential danger of recreational activities occurring in the nearby Clear Creek Management Area (CCMA). This is a surrounding area of the mine managed by the Bureau of Land Management (BLM) where off-road driving, camping, and hiking were proven to cause higher asbestos levels in the air. Tests of air samples showed that long term activities caused greater risk of cancer. The area was immediately closed by the BLM for further discussion of remediation methods.

The City of Coalinga OU was focused on remediation of asbestos that had been transported to mills or stored. The cleanup area consisted of 107 acres of contaminated soil within the city of Coalinga. Beginning in 1989, over 200,000 cubic yards of asbestos, nickel and chromium-contaminated soil and building debris were consolidated to be disposed and contained in an underground waste management unit (WMU). The area of the WMU was capped with an impermeable cover, and is to be continuously monitored along with the groundwater and air. The area excavated was regraded. Cleanup of this sector occurred between 1990 and 1993.

== Status quo ==
The Atlas Asbestos Mine Superfund Site was removed from the National Priorities List (NPL) on April 24, 1998, based on the fact that responsible parties have taken appropriate action in preventing further environmental damage of the area. However, as long as hazardous materials remain at the site above levels considered safe by the EPA, reviews must occur every five years.

The first five-year report was conducted in 2001.

The second five-year report of the site was completed on September 28, 2006. Due to regulation changes to the levels of asbestos allowed in places of contamination in the soil around the underground waste management unit (WMU), additional remedial action was recommended to assure the safety of the area. After additional tests conducted by the EPA on water and air samples, results showed that cleanup activities were still protective of human health as well as the environment. Thus it was established that cleanup has been completed successfully in the Atlas Asbestos Mine site.

The most recent five-year review was completed in September 2016. The review states that the remedies taken are functioning as intended, and no information was found to contest the effectiveness of the remedies.

== See also ==
- List of Superfund sites in California
