= Fresno Municipal Sanitary Landfill =

- Fresno Sanitary Landfill
- U.S. National Register of Historic Places
- U.S. National Historic Landmark
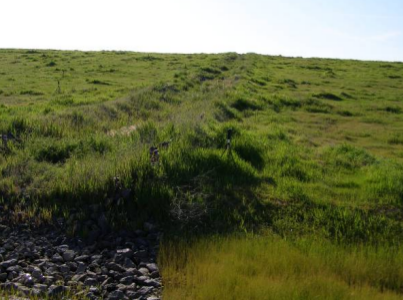
- A drainage channel on the slopes of the former landfill

- Location within California
- Location: S. West Ave. and W. Jensen Ave., Fresno, California
- Coordinates: 36°42′0″N 119°49′47″W
- Area: 140 acres (57 ha)
- Architect: Jean Vincenz
- NRHP reference No.: 01001050

Significant dates
- Began accepting waste: 1937
- Accepted last waste: July 1, 1987
- Named to Superfund list: October 10, 1989
- Added to NRHP: August 7, 2001
- Designated NHL: August 7, 2001

Fresno Municipal Sanitary Landfill in Fresno, California, was the first modern landfill in the U.S., pioneering the use of trenching, compacting, and daily burial to combat rodent and debris problems. It became a model for other landfills around the country, and one of the longest-lived. The landfill was operated by the City of Fresno from 1937 until 1987, when it was closed. At that time, the landfill had reached the size of 145 acres (0.59 km^{2}).

== History ==
=== Construction and operation ===
Fresno, like other growing cities, sought a suitable long-term solution to the disposal of municipal solid waste in the 1930s. Jean Vincenz, a civil engineer by training, became Fresno commissioner of public works, city engineer, and manager of utilities in 1931. Vincenz recommended that the city not renew its waste disposal contract with the Fresno Disposal Company, which operated an incinerator at the time. Rather, the city conducted an experiment in the operation of a "sanitary" landfill near its water treatment plant, in which a trench was dug, filled with waste, and then covered with fill dug from an adjacent trench, which would be the next area filled. Vincenz emphasized the importance of compacting the fill, saying that without compaction, the waste would attract rats. The demonstration site opened in 1934, and was judged a success.

The present site was acquired by the city in 1937, opened the same year and began accepting waste. In 1945, the landfill expanded south of Annadale Avenue.

During its years of operation, the city filled an average of 4.3 acres (1.7 ha) per year with about 24,000 tons of waste. The city kept no records of the types of waste accepted besides billing receipts, however it has been judged that the waste stream included organic materials as well as hazardous materials such as petroleum products, solvents and battery acid.

=== Closure and cleanup ===
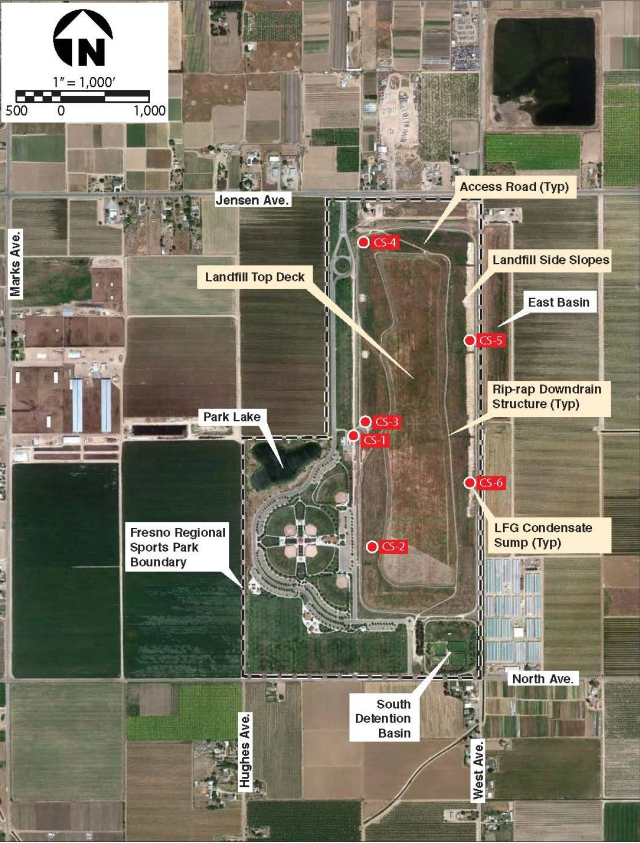
Superfund Site Map circa 2020, showing Regional Sports Complex

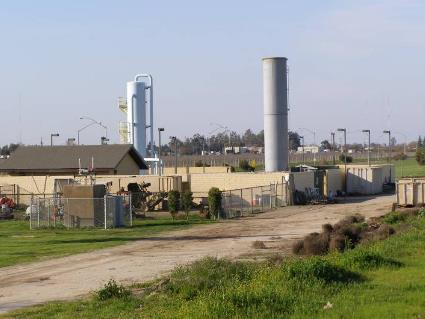
Groundwater Treatment Plant at the Fresno Landfill in 2010

The EPA's Superfund program began in 1980 and received a notification from the Fresno Solid Waste Management Division regarding the landfill. In May 1981, the Superfund program evaluated the landfill and the city began the process of closing it. The landfill received its last waste on July 1, 1987.

In 1983, the California Department of Health Services conducted tests which found that the site contained methane and vinyl chloride gases that were penetrating into the areas around the landfill. These tests also concluded that contaminants were being found in private ground-water wells around the landfill.

On June 24, 1988, the site was officially proposed as a Superfund site and was finalized on the program's National Priorities List (NPL) on October 10, 1989. The city agreed to begin investigations into monitoring and cleaning up the hazardous aspects of the site. Remediation measures such as landfill cover, landfill gas control, and surface water management systems were constructed between July 1999 and June 2000. A groundwater treatment plant was completed in September 2001.

Some remediated city land adjacent to the landfill has been turned into a baseball, softball, and soccer complex with a playground and picnic tables. It was opened in 2001, named the "Regional Sports Complex" and operated as a Fresno city park.

=== Landmark status and controversy ===
It was declared a National Historic Landmark on August 27, 2001. The announcement that a landfill would be designated as a National Landmark was panned in the media and used as an opportunity by some to disparage the environmental policies of George W. Bush, despite the nomination process for this beginning during the previous administration. The Interior Department struggled to deal with the controversy and paused the designation pending further inquiry. It was revealed that the Park Service's advisory board had voted 10–1 to place the landfill on the landmark list.

== Description ==
The former Fresno Municipal Sanitary Landfill is located about 3 miles (4.8 km) from downtown Fresno, on 140 acres (57 ha) of land at the southwest corner of South West Avenue and West Jensen Avenue. The landfill is a basically rectangular mound, about 4,200 feet (1,300 m) long and 1,250 feet (380 m) wide. It rises to a height about 60 feet (18 m) above the surrounding grade, its sides at a varying but typically steep pitch. It is covered with grass. The landfill has no lining.

== Impact ==
According to historian Martin Melosi, the site was "the first landfill to employ the trench method of disposal and the first to utilize compaction." The design became a model for other landfills around the country, and was the accepted best form of municipal disposal in the 1950s and 1960s. The 1970s brought criticism of the method and new disposal options were considered.

For his contribution to this advancement, Jean Vincenz was named assistant chief in the Army Corps of Engineers, operating out of headquarters in Washington, DC. Vincenz was later honored, being named president of the American Public Works Association for his accomplishments.

== See also ==
- List of Superfund sites in the United States
- National Register of Historic Places listings in Fresno County, California
- Superfund sites in California
