= Lead poisoning epidemics =

Instances of mass lead poisoning

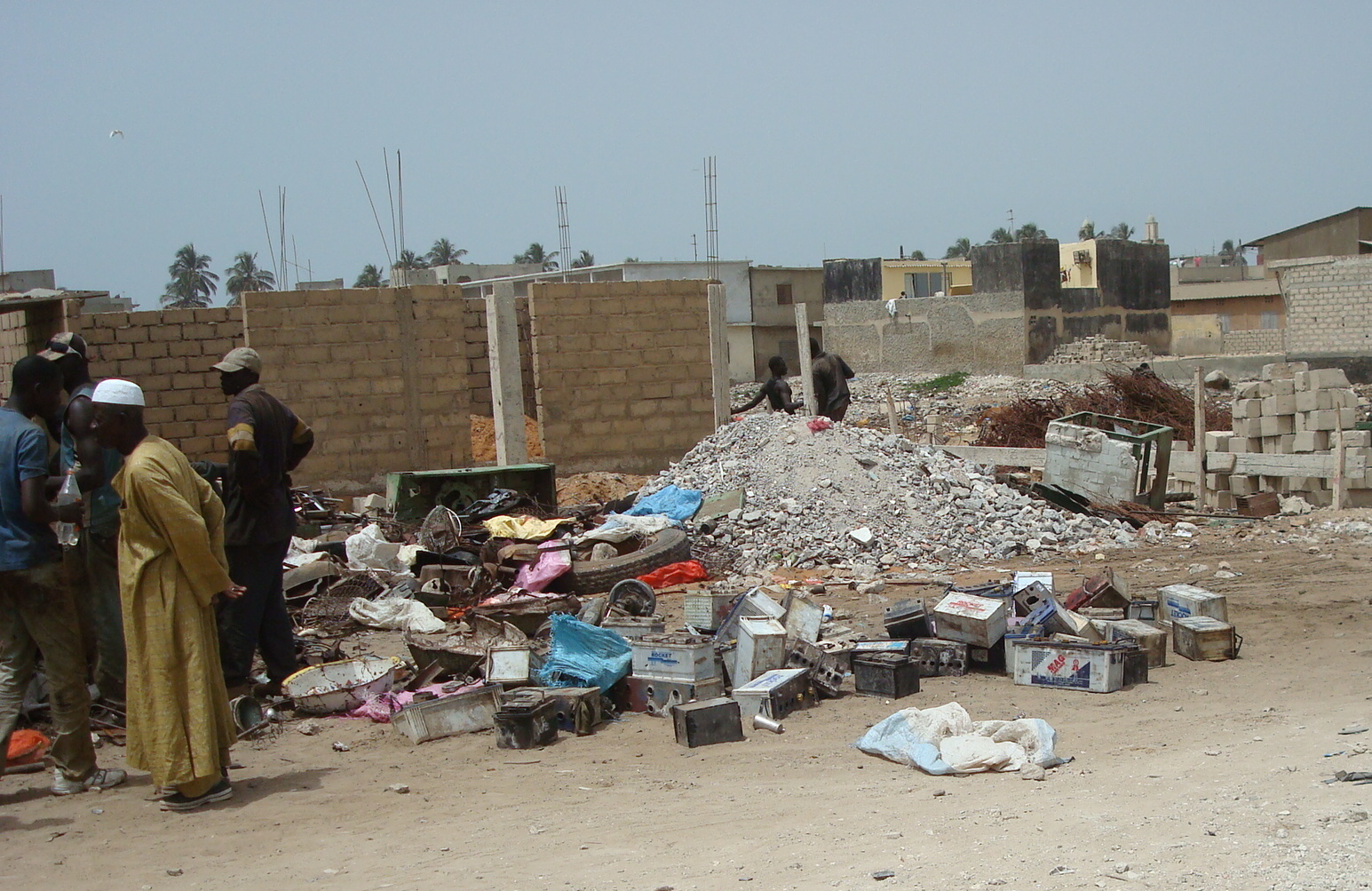
Automobile batteries being recycled at the Thiaroye-sur-Mer site where 18 children died of lead poisoning in 2008

Lead poisoning epidemics refer to specific instances of mass lead poisoning. These events often occur without the knowledge of the communities they affect. Common causes of lead poisoning epidemics include mining, lead recycling, and food/water contamination. These events also cause disproportionate childhood fatalities as children are more susceptible to lead poisoning than adults.

== Notable poisoning events ==
This list does not include events wherein fewer than 100 people were affected, individual lead paint poisoning cases, or lead poisoning resulting from the consumption of contaminated food or water, such as the Flint water crisis. The cases below are discrete events of mass lead poisonings.

Large-scale lead poisoning events
Name of event	Year	Country	City	# Tested high*	# deaths	Source of lead exposure	Comments	Ref.
Đông Mai	2015	Vietnam	Đông Mai	102	0	Auto-battery recycling	Ongoing	
El Paso/Juarez	1974	USA/Mexico	El Paso, Texas	391	0	Lead smelter	Plant closed	
Fiengxiang	2009	China	Shaanxi	851+ (Note: The number only counts children. There were also adults affected, including employees.)	0	Lead smelter		
Hunan	2008	China	Hunan	1354+ (Note: The number only counts children. There were also adults affected, including employees.)	0	Manganese factory		
Jiyuan	2009	China	Jiyuan	1000	0	Lead smelter	99.7% of children poisoned	
Doe Run	2004	Peru	La Oroya	100's	0	Lead smelter	Plant closed	
Michoacán	2009?	Mexico	Michoacán	311	0	Lead-glazed pottery	Ongoing	
Santo Amaro	1985	Brazil	Bahia	555	0	Lead smelter		
Thiaroye-sur-Mer	2008	Senegal	Thiaroye, Dakar	150+	18	Auto-battery recycling	Closed	
Torreón	2000	Mexico	Torreón	11181	0	Lead smelter		
Zamfara	2010	Nigeria	Zamfara	1000+	163–400	Artisanal mining	Ongoing	
Kabwe	2013	Zambia	Kabwe	1000+	0	Lead mining and smelter		
Tianshui kindergarten	2025	China	Tianshui	247+ (Note: The number only counts children. There were also adults affected, including employees.)	0	Food (As reported by government)		

- Number tested high is defined as a blood lead level greater than or equal to 10 micrograms per deciliter whole blood (μg/dl)

== See also ==
- List of human-made mass poisoning incidents
- Lead contamination in Washington, D.C., drinking water
- Flint water crisis
- 2009 Chinese lead poisoning scandal
- Exide lead contamination from battery recycling in the U.S.
- Lead contamination in Oakland
