= Exide lead contamination =

Operations at battery plants that posed a health risk

Coordinates: 34°0′19″N 118°11′36″W

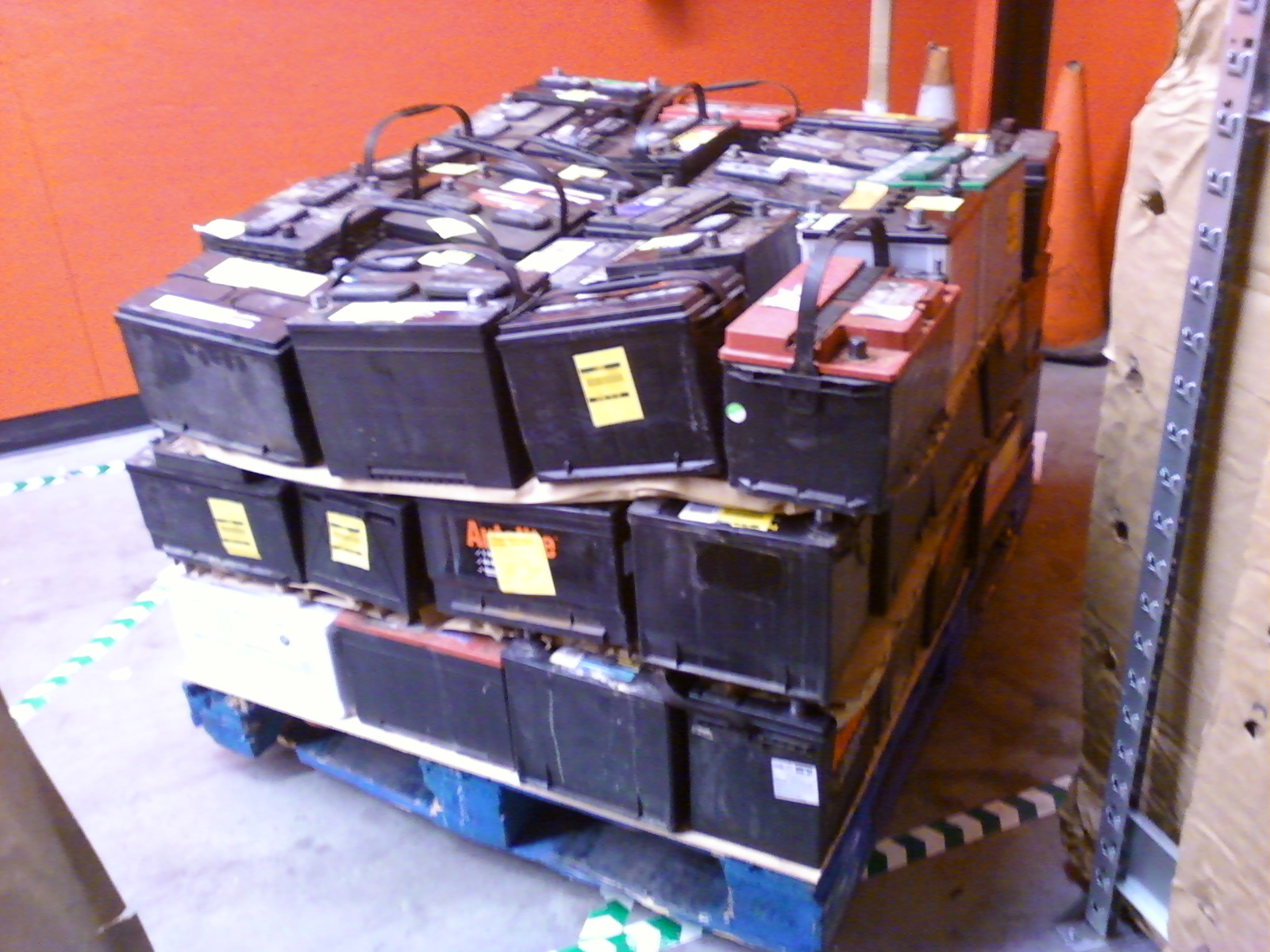
Pallet of scrap lead–acid automotive batteries ready to be recycled

Exide was one of the world's largest producers, distributors and recyclers of lead–acid batteries. Lead–acid batteries are used in automobiles, golf carts, fork-lifts, electric cars and motorcycles. They are recycled by grinding them open, neutralizing the sulfuric acid, and separating the polymers from the lead and copper. In the US, 97 percent of the lead from car batteries is recycled, which is the highest recycling rate for any commodity. Most states require stores to take back old batteries.

Since 2010, operations at seven Exide lead–acid battery plants have been linked to ambient heavy metal levels that posed a health risk to the environment and thousands of residents in neighborhoods surrounding the Exide plants. Exide has been found to be a significant source of lead emissions and/or contamination in Crescentville, Philadelphia (1920–1978); Los Angeles County; Frisco, Texas; Muncie, Indiana; Salina, Kansas; Bristol, Tennessee; Reading, Pennsylvania; and Forest City, Missouri.

== Los Angeles County, California (Vernon) ==
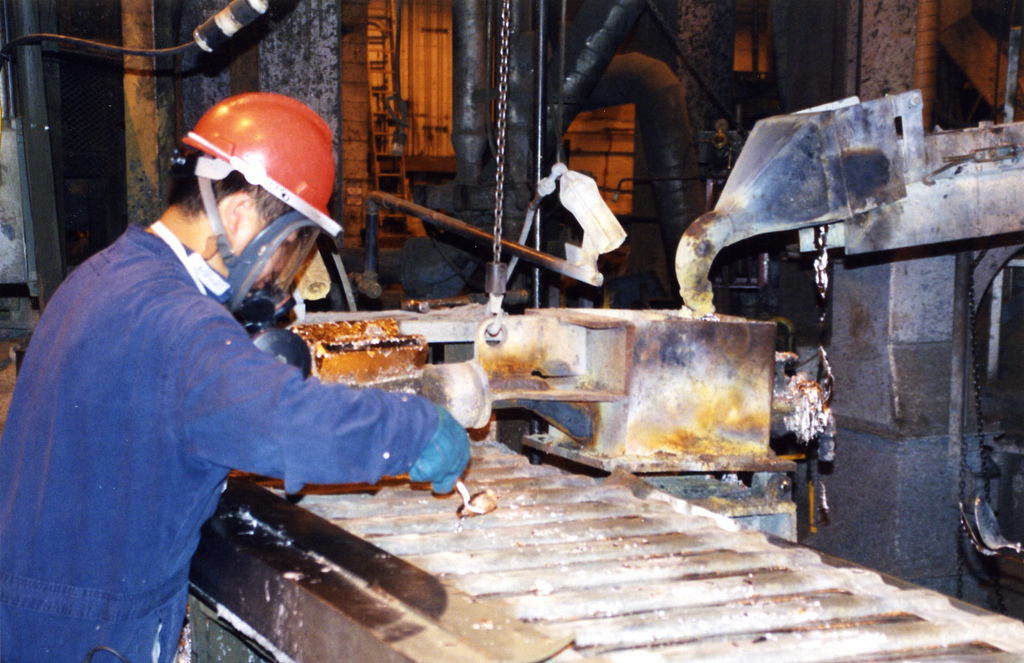
Recycling lead in a lead–acid battery recovery facility

A battery recycling plant in southeast Los Angeles County, California, United States, emitted toxic metal dust over decades that contaminated as many as 10,000 homes in half a dozen working-class, Latino communities near the plant. Lead is a neurotoxin that causes harm to most organs, but it most commonly causes cognitive deficits, neurodevelopmental delays, and psychological impairments. Exide Technologies, owner of the lead–acid battery smelter located in Vernon, agreed in 2015 to close the facility during the massive cleanup of the contaminated soil, which will take years and cost hundreds of millions of dollars.

=== Background ===
The 15-acre battery recycling plant (6.1 ha) was in Vernon – a heavily industrialized city in Southeast Los Angeles county. The plant processed over 11 million used lead batteries each year. The smelter was issued an "interim status document" by the California Department of Health Services in 1981 and operated under a provisional permit while documented violations were occurring. Exide took ownership of the smelter when they purchased the Gould-National Battery and its assets in 2000. In 2013, Exide was under federal criminal investigation for emitting high levels of harmful pollutants from its battery recycling plant in Vernon, California. Hundreds of residents had complained for years about Exide's toxic emissions before state and federal agencies acted. Organized opposition included Mothers of East Los Angeles, students, and local churches. In March 2015, the company signed an agreement with the U.S. attorney's office to close permanently. The deal allowed Exide and its employees to avoid prosecution for years of environmental crimes, including illegal storage, disposal and shipment of hazardous waste, while agreeing to pay $50 million to demolish and clean the plant and surrounding communities, including $9 million set aside for removing lead from homes.

=== Environmental impact ===
The soil beneath the facility tests high for toxic metals. The groundwater was also polluted from the operation of the plant and corrosive and irritating sulfates drained onto public streets.

Studies have indicated that as many as 10,000 homes in half a dozen working-class, Latino communities near the plant have had their homes and yards contaminated by the lead emissions. The decades of air pollution from the Exide Technologies facility has potentially contaminated the nearby communities of Boyle Heights, Maywood, East Los Angeles, Commerce, Bell, and Huntington Park.

Residents had long been concerned about the air pollution from the plant that was found to have emitted lead, arsenic and other dangerous pollutants over decades. Lead is a potent neurotoxin that puts children at-risk for learning disabilities, lower IQs and other developmental problems who may have acquired lead poisoning from playing outdoors.

=== Public Health Impacts ===
Throughout history, lead exposure has led to public health problems, specifically for workers in factories or other industrial entities. While past measures that prevent lead exposure in the first place have been successful, "secondary prevention" is emphasized by public health agencies now, leaving the people who have already been exposed or who will continually be exposed at risk because lead is still used in the manufacture of batteries, buses, trucks, tractors, and motorcycles. As a result, Low income communities and communities of color face a major gap in the public health system for lead exposure prevention.

According to "Industrial Lead Poisoning in Los Angeles: Anatomy of a Public Health Failure" in the Journal of Environmental Justice, Southeastern Los Angeles has similar gaps and failures of lead prevention as in the Flint, Michigan water crisis. Since the 1970s, Exide had been operating in Vernon. In 2013, AQMD explained that upwards of 250,000 residents in East Los Angeles face a chronic health hazard from lead and arsenic exposure from Exide. Communities living near Exide such as Boyle Heights and Maywood are more than 90% Latino and rank among the top 10% of most environmentally burdened areas in California. More than 90% of homes in the area were built before the 1978 ban on lead paint and many directly neighbor freeways and truck routes which resulted in decades of exposure to leaded gasoline which contaminated soil. Lead exposure is especially prevalent in soil, water, and dust; it has the most impact on the children and workers around Vernon.

In 2019, a study conducted by the University of Southern California found a high amount of lead in baby teeth of children in Boyle Heights, Maywood, East Los Angeles, Commerce, and Huntington Park. The lead in the baby teeth matched with soil contamination data from the California Department of Toxic Substances Control. The Truth Fairy study revealed that children in Boyle Heights and East L.A. have the highest exposure to lead, which most likely came through winds carrying soil in utero from their mother or post birth. The study urges legislators to create initiatives to prevent lead exposure. Jill Johnston, co author of the study and professor of preventive medicine explains, "higher lead in teeth means higher lead in the brain, kidney and bones. Testing women for lead during pregnancy, or even earlier, as they enter child-bearing age, may be needed to decrease lead exposure to their future offspring."

=== Testing and clean-up ===
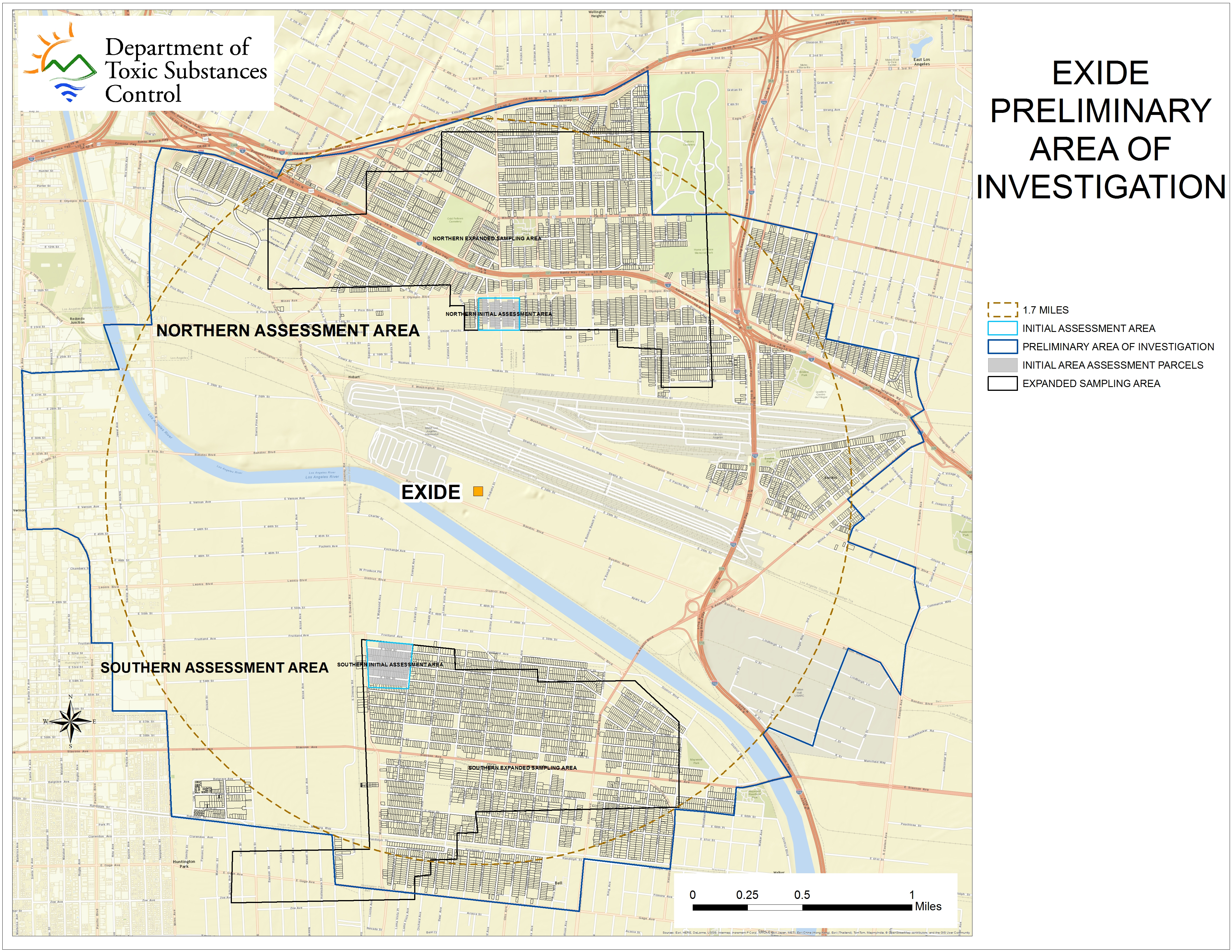
DTSC Preliminary Area of Investigation map

The facility closure is overseen by the California Department of Toxic Substances Control (DTSC) and the South Coast Air Quality Management District (SCAQMD). The closure includes dismantling the former recycling facility under a full enclosure tent, under negative pressure, preventing emissions from leaving the premises. Hazardous materials from the facility are recycled or disposed of under DTSC oversight.

The cleanup of the soil contaminated with lead is being overseen by the DTSC. In August 2015, the department announced that soil testing had shown that the toxic dust had deposited lead in as many as 10,000 homes. Department officials said that they had not previously been involved in a lead cleanup case in which the number of properties was this high.

Nineteen homes received first priority for cleanup starting in December 2014 based on the test results. The residents of two neighborhoods in Boyle Heights and Maywood were notified in August 2015 that they could have their soil tested for lead after being identified by the SCAQMD as the communities most likely to have been contaminated by the lead emissions. Contaminated soil was removed and replaced at 146 of the homes closest to the facility in these communities.

High lead levels were found in the soil at Lorena and Rowan Elementary Schools in the summer of 2015 by the Department of Toxic Substances Control.

In October 2015 the Los Angeles County Board of Supervisors, frustrated with the slow pace by the state, designated $2 million to "facilitate" the cleanup effort by hiring contractors and consultants, performing soil testing at 1,000 homes during the following two months, and sending community outreach workers to neighborhoods around the plant. A timeline and strategy was also included in the resolution to force state regulators, Exide "and other responsible parties to fully fund and undertake this cleanup." The state had used all but $1 million of $9 million Exide placed in a trust fund for residential cleanup. By the end of February 2016, county crews began testing soil at homes in Commerce. The state allocated $176.6 million for the cost of testing and cleanup of about 2,500 of the most contaminated yards. Job training programs for community members to be employed in cleanup have been planned by the Department of Toxic Substances Control. It is also establishing a local office to improve and coordinate information-sharing efforts. Local community groups are working with the agency for outreach in signing up residents for testing.

In fall 2017, the Department of Toxic Substances Control began to implement their plans to remove lead-contaminated soil from 2,500 residential properties near the closed Exide Technologies lead–acid battery plant in Vernon. It is believed to be the largest environmental cleanup effort of its kind in California history, encompassing seven Los Angeles County neighborhoods. California state regulators estimate that Exide's operations may have threatened the health of an estimated 100,000 people and 10,000 residential properties. A total of $192 million has been authorized by the state for the massive cleanup effort; $176.6 million of which was approved by Governor Jerry Brown in April 2016.

The $192 million set aside by the State will only allow for cleanup of 2,500 of the estimated 10,000 homes and properties believed to have been contaminated by Exide's decades of pollution. Total costs to clean up the estimated 10,000 homes contaminated by Exide's pollution is believed to be over $500 million. By August 2016, over $42 million of the $192 million had already been spent.

Facing mounting pressure from community activists, residents, and elected officials, to hold Exide, and not taxpayers, accountable for millions of dollars of additional money needed to clean up Exide's toxic lead mess in east L.A. County, the South Coast Air Quality Management District filed claims against Exide totaling over $80 million. Exide filed its own lawsuit in 2016 seeking blood lead data on people tested in L.A. County, including each person's age, city and ZIP Code; the age of the home in which each person lived; and any causes of lead poisoning. The state is fighting the lawsuit in court, calling it an attempt by Exide to dodge financial responsibility and blame the contamination on lead paint and gasoline. Paying for the cleanup might admit guilt that could lead to criminal charges and jail time for executives.

On January 31, 2018, Exide Technologies told a bankruptcy judge that their company was not responsible for the $80 million in additional cleanup costs that the State of California was trying to recoup, and that the State's claim should be discharged as part of the company's Chapter 11 bankruptcy plan in 2015. With the State legislation placing creditors ahead of environmental cleanups, and with the bankruptcy judge ruling in favour of Exide, taxpayers will end up paying for the cleanup, while the company will be released from all liability. The bankruptcy judge allowed a "nonconsensual" plan with a release of liability and abandonment of the property in October 2020.

By 2023, the state spent more than $336 million and overseen the remediation of nearly 4,400 properties. State legislators included funding for cleaning up the parkway strips between the street and sidewalk. Legislators were frustrated to learn that the money was not used to clean up the parkway and reverted to the state budget. The 2023 state budget dedicated $40.4 million and nearly $27 million in 2024 to remove and replace the toxic soil from more than 6,400 parkways. In 2023, the California Department of Toxic Substances Control began publishing detailed records of the cleanup status of the roughly 10,000 properties.

=== Legislation ===
The state had dedicated about $7 million to test and clean up homes in 2015. The state assembly voted in 2016 to provide $176.6 million for the cleanup. State legislators held an informational hearing at the Capitol on January 26, 2016 where Assemblyman Jimmy Gomez (D-Echo Park) noted the rapid mobilization for the Porter Ranch gas leak near a wealthier community while the slow progress in these neighborhoods where most residents are Latino and low-income should be disheartening to all legislators. Gomez said "We don't want to send the wrong message. That if you live ... in Porter Ranch that you're more important than the folks that live in East ... or Southeast Los Angeles."

At the January 26, 2016 hearing, Assembly Speaker Anthony Rendon (D-Lakewood) said the Department of Toxic Substances Control "has not done a good job" and that he would urge officials to act more urgently on the clean-up. The extent and duration of the lead contamination has raised concerns about longstanding problems at the department. The Governor and state legislators saw this as an wake-up call to seek new laws, hold oversight hearings, and work on other reform efforts.

In May 2018, the California state Assembly approved a budget action and legislation, AB 2189, to commit $16 million in funds for cleaning public parkways. The funding would come from a bill the California state legislature passed in 2016 to raise about $176 million to help clean-up Exide's toxic lead contamination mess in Vernon, and surrounding neighborhoods, by levying a fee on batteries for all battery manufacturers and consumers.

When AB 2189 became law, it raised the cost of the taxpayer-funded Exide cleanup to over $200 million.

California's state auditor will investigate how the Department of Toxic Substances Control is handling cleanup after the Joint Committee on Legislative Audit voted in February 2020 to probe contracts, cleanup times, and other issues.

== Environmental contamination record elsewhere in the US ==
The EPA's Lead National Ambient Air Quality Standards (NAAQS) Non-attainment Designations list designates a total of 21 areas and parts of 22 counties across 15 states and Puerto Rico that are in violation of federal air quality health standards for lead emissions.

Exide has operations in 6 out of the 21 areas that do not meet safe air quality laws; accounting for nearly one-third of the violators (more than any other company). The Exide plants in violation of EPA lead emission standards are in Frisco, Texas, Vernon, California, Muncie, Indiana, Salina, Kansas, Reading, Pennsylvania, and Bristol, Tennessee.

=== Crescentville, Philadelphia, Pennsylvania ===
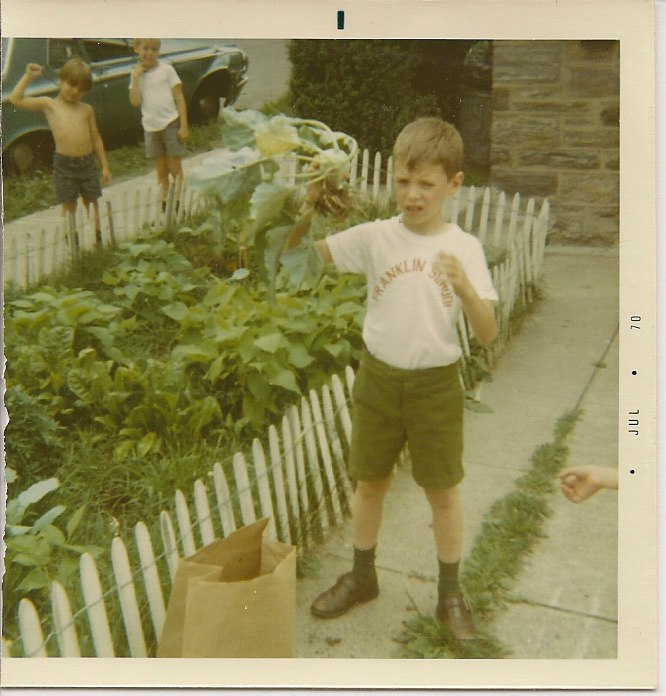
Students of Franklin Elementary School harvested and ate vegetables grown near the ESB, Inc. Exide lead–acid battery factory.

From 1920 until 1978, the Electric Storage Battery Company (later ESB, Inc.) operated a lead–acid battery factory on forty acres of land in Crescentville at the intersection of Adams Avenue and Rising Sun Avenue. Robert A. Kehoe wrote a description of it in a letter in 1948, mentioning him seeing "uncontrolled fume [sic]" during a visit. Letters and a speech regarding the medical conditions of the workers at the lead–acid battery factory in 1948 and 1949 exist. In 1954 workers would saw lead lug nuts and blow the dust into the ventilation system. In 1968, Robert A. Kehoe wrote to William Pallies of ESB, Inc. to discuss how to defeat in court Reuben D. Shoemaker, who had 100 micrograms per deciliter of lead in his blood on record. Kehoe claimed that no honest and competent expert witness can prevail against his medico-legal testimony ESB, Inc. dropped out of a 1973 behavioral study on the grounds that non-ESB researchers were informing the ESB workers that they should see private physicians. The same year, the EPA published a report which said that the average lead acid battery plant emitted 11 pounds of lead into the environment every day.

=== Muncie, Indiana ===
Between 1989 and 2015, Exide Technologies released more than 227,275 pounds of toxic pollutants, including dangerous lead, sulfuric acid and arsenic, into the air and water in Muncie, Indiana where they operate a secondary lead–acid battery smelter. In November 2010, the City of Muncie, Indiana and Delaware County were placed on the U.S. EPA's nonattainment list for concentrations of toxic lead in the air that are too high to meet national air quality standards for lead due to emissions from the Exide plant in Muncie.

In March 2015, Exide Technologies agreed to pay an $820,000 civil penalty to settle a lawsuit for violating the Clean Air Act at its Muncie lead smelter plant. According to the U.S. EPA, the violations resulted in increased emissions of lead and particulate matter and may have resulted in increased emissions of total hydrocarbons, volatile organic compounds and dioxin/furans.

In October 2015, the Department of Justice and Exide Technologies rejected pleas from the mayor of Muncie, environmental/health groups and three neighborhood associations to install a $31 million in pollution-control equipment at the company's battery recycling facility; like their competitor Quemetco did for their similar lead–acid battery plant in nearby Indianapolis. More than a dozen public health, neighborhood, environmental, and public health organizations, led by the Hoosier Environmental Council, had urged the U.S. Department of Justice (DOJ) to add additional pollution controls to the proposed settlement to better protect people in Muncie from lead and arsenic released into the air by Exide. The organizations also asked the DOJ to require Exide to include monitoring for pollutants at Exide's fenceline.

In February 2017, the Exide plant in Muncie experienced three explosions and leakage issues that were not fully or timely disclosed to the relevant state and federal agencies responsible for ensuring Exide's compliance with state and federal laws and safety protocols. Local residents were not made aware of these explosions until nearly a year later, January 2018, raising concerns about any risks to the environment and to the health and safety of hundreds of families that live near the Exide facility.

A year later, in February 2018, it was reported that a local pediatrician and the Delaware County Health Department had informed Indiana state officials in 2017 of cases of Exide Technologies' workers tracking lead home on their clothing and exposing their children to the toxic metal.

It was also reported that the local health department made a complaint on June 20 to the Indiana Department of Environmental Management about "a recent increase in the amount of elevated blood lead level cases" reported to local health officials in the community, and that "several of these cases have revealed connections to the Exide plant" with the "business's activities" being a "likely source of this lead exposure."

Following reports that Exide workers may have exposed their families to lead contamination in Muncie, residents there have expressed broader concerns about Exide's lead–acid battery plant and the toll that Exide's decades of toxic emissions of lead and other contaminants may have had on the health and safety of hundreds of residents that live near the plant.

In response to the Indiana Department of Environmental Management's (IDEM) decision not to hold a public meeting on Exide's five-year general operating permit in 2018, dozens of residents took to the streets near the Exide plant in Muncie to decry IDEM's decision and to push for testing of the air, soil and water at the hundreds of homes and properties located near the lead–acid battery plant.

=== Salina, Kansas (elevated lead levels in children) ===
Exide Technologies operates a large lead–acid battery plant in Salina, Kansas. Between 1987 and 2015, Exide released over 166,077 pounds of lead, antimony, arsenic and other contaminates into the air and water in Salina. Between 2010–2013, and in 2016, Exide exceeded allowed lead concentration release limits over 18 times, in violation of the Clean Air Act, and in 2010, the plant was largely responsible for the area being designated as one of 16 areas in the nation with concentrations of toxic lead in the air too high to meet national air quality standards for lead according to the EPA.

Residents over the years have expressed concerns about the plant and have asked about possible correlations to reports and data showing higher numbers of blood lead levels in children in Saline County, where Exide operates, than in surrounding counties and communities in Kansas. Between 2000–2010, the mean blood lead levels in Saline Co. averaged 16.5 ug/dL, more than double that of all other counties in Kansas which averaged 7.5 ug/dL and children living in the city of Salina, had a significantly higher mean blood lead level (3.00 μg/dL) compared to children living in all other Kansas zip codes (2.86 μg/dL)

In 2016, the Kansas Department of Health and Environment (KDHE) organized a meeting after tests by local doctors in 2016 found elevated lead levels in the blood of 32 Saline County children—most of them from Salina. This came on the heels of reports of elevated blood levels being found in 84 Saline County children between 2013–2015.

A few residents at the 2016 community meeting asked whether local officials and agencies were investigating any potential correlation or links to the number of children in Salina with elevated levels of toxic lead in their blood, and Exide's lead–acid-battery plant in Salina. However, representatives at KDHE tried to avert the inquires by noting that the Exide plant had reduced their lead emissions each year since 2012, following the EPA's stricter requirements on lead emissions, and some plant renovations, and glossed over the fact that Exide still sent a total of 6,720 pounds of lead into the air during that period (2012–2015). KDHE also failed to mention the potentially bigger problem of cumulative lead and other toxic contaminate build up in the soil and water within a 1–3 mile radius of the plant over the decades the plant has been in operation, and did not demonstrate any intention to test the soil or groundwater of homes and public spaces near the plant for elevated levels of lead and other toxic contaminants.

KDHE representatives also helped point the arrow away from Exide by releasing a map showing where the 32 children with elevated blood levels live, many not adjacent to Exide's plant. However, KDHE representatives failed to mention that no comprehensive blood testing was conducted for families that live near the plant, that results included only reported cases from local doctors whose parents brought their child in for a medical issue or check-in, and that the children of employees who work at the plant, who are exposed daily to lead, live all over the city and not just adjacent to the plant.

To date, no substantive government action has been taken to address this issue. The contamination source(s) for the disproportionate number of children with elevated blood lead levels in Salina, Kansas, and Saline County, remains an apparent mystery.

=== Columbus, Georgia ===
Exide used to operate a secondary lead recycling plant in Columbus that was taken out of service in 1999 and now the plant continues to operate as a lead–acid battery manufacturing facility at 3639 Joy Road. Between 1987–2015, Exide released 362,102 pounds of toxic pollutants, including lead and arsenic, in the air and water near their plant in Columbus.

In 1988, Exide was forced to clean up contaminated groundwater in Columbus resulting from their plant and practices. Costs for supplemental investigations, remediation and site closure are ongoing and currently estimated at $13.5 million.

In 2009, Exide received $34.3 million in federal taxpayer money and over $15 million in local tax incentives to boost production of next gen batteries and create more jobs at their plants in Columbus and Bristol, Tennessee, but came under fire after shuttering their plant in Bristol not long after taking the taxpayer money and incentives.

In 2017, Georgia's Environmental Protection Division fined Exide Technologies $41,000 for violating federal emissions standards on lead at their Columbus lead–acid battery plant in November and December 2016 and January 2017.

Just recently, in 2018, Exide Technologies was fined $11,328 by the state of Georgia for once again not being in compliance with toxic emissions standards and safety. Inspectors found that Exide was emitting high levels of lead particulate into the air; over 200% more than the legal limit allows. News of Exide's excessive lead emissions has raised concerns among thousands of residents and families that live near Exide's plant on what Exide's practices mean for their health and safety. Several residents have asked that something be done to ensure they and their families are safe and are not exposed to dangerous levels of lead contamination in the air, soil and water where they live.

=== Reading, Pennsylvania (toxic contamination and ongoing cleanup) ===
Exide operates a lead smelter and recycled lead batteries in Reading, Pennsylvania. The EPA found that Exide contributed to lead emissions and toxic contaminant releases that impacted the soils in the surrounding community and conditions at the site that required extensive cleanup and remediation of toxic contaminants in the area in 1996.

In 2012, Exide announced plans to idle their lead-recycling operations in Reading/Laureldale and laid off 150 workers with plans to keep their permits active should they decide to re-open in the future. In 2015, Berks County pursued legal action to strengthen air-pollution monitoring near the Exide facility to better protect residents' health and safety but a federal appeals court denied the County's request to relocate a pollution monitor or install an additional air monitor near the plant. County Commissioner Mark C. Scott noted that the appeal was filed as a preemptive measure to protect the community from air pollution if the Exide plant decides to reopen.

==== Lead contamination from Exide Plant resurfaces after cleanup ====
In 2017, the Reading Eagle newspaper published a series of stories that focused on a study that found lead levels remain high in the borough despite remediation efforts ordered by the U.S. Environmental Protection Agency about two decades ago at hundreds of properties near the Exide plant. A team of reporters worked in collaboration with a chemistry professor at Metropolitan State University in Denver to conduct soil studies in Laureldale and found strong signs that decades of toxic emissions from the Exide Technologies' battery factory in Reading are taking their toll on neighboring properties.

News of the study has raised strong concerns from residents in the community about Exide's past practices and pollution and any impacts it may have had on the health and safety of residents that live near the plant. For example, there was a story about one Reading family's plea for help on social media for an investigation into the cause of lead poisoning in their family. And there was a story about a local high school reunion and "a darker truth" that "local industry and the pollutants it creates may be to blame" for the above average loss of many classmates over the years.

In response to the study and findings of elevated levels of lead near the idled Exide plant, State Sen. Judy Schwank called for review of the original Reading/Laureldale cleanup. A bipartisan group of lawmakers also created a task force to assess the scope of Pennsylvania's lead problem and recommend changes to the way the state tests and remediates lead contamination. The U.S. Army Corps of Engineers grabbed soil samples from six residential properties in Laureldale and Muhlenberg Township to test whether lead concentrations pose a public health risk as part of a federal follow-up to a recent soil study that found high lead concentrations in properties that should have been remediated a decade ago near a now idled battery plant owned by Exide Technologies Inc. In late 2017, the federal EPA commenced cleanup of soil contaminated with lead from the idled Exide plant. The breadth and cost of the cleanup is ongoing and there is no reporting to suggest that Exide is being held financially accountable for the toxic cleanup; taxpayers appear to be on the hook for the new remediation and cleanup costs.

=== Bristol, Tennessee ===
In 2008, it was reported that Exide was emitting two times the amount of pollutants allowed into the environment at their secondary lead–acid battery smelter plant in Bristol, Tennessee. Instead of correcting their behavior, Exide asked the state to raise the emissions limit by two times. It was also reported that Exide was doing its own testing and that the Tennessee Division of Air Pollution Control appeared to have no idea of the level of pollution coming from the Bristol plant.

In 2013, Exide idled the facility and laid off hundreds of Bristol employees after having received $34.3 million in federal taxpayer stimulus money and as much as $15 million in state tax incentives for their plants in Bristol, Tennessee, and Columbus, Georgia. Instead of investing that taxpayer money, as promised, in Bristol, and creating new jobs, Exide closed the plant "as part of a strategic initiative to have other manufacturing locations running near capacity."

In March 2017, Exide filed an application with the State of Tennessee to resume partial operations at the idled facility in Bristol, Tennessee. Hundreds of residents expressed concerns about Exide's resumed operation of the plant in Bristol and demanded a public meeting on Exide's application. Giving in to mounting pressure for a public meeting and a cry for more safety monitoring in light of Exide's long record of fines and violations for emissions and safety practices, Exide elected to withdraw their application to resume operations in Bristol in April 2017.

=== Frisco, Texas (toxic contamination and cleanup) ===
From 2001 to 2012, Exide Technologies received 50 written notices of violation for unsafe working conditions at their Frisco lead–acid battery recycling plant. The Texas Commission on Environmental Quality (TCEQ) found 27 violations at the plant that occurred between March 31, 2009, and June 30, 2010. The TCEQ listed 12 violations which included soil and water contamination and evidence of toxic discharges that raised concerns about effects on downstream waters. Between May and June 2011, the TCEQ conducted four separate investigations on Exide's Frisco facility and found dangerous levels of lead and cadmium compounds that qualify the facility for Superfund site status.

The Exide plant ceased operations in 2012 following a $45 million agreement with the city of Frisco to transfer a 180-acre buffer zone surrounding the plant to the city while the company would keep the 90 acres of land the plant occupies. As part of the requirements of the deal, Exide is required to clean the land to federally acceptable standards before transferring it to the city. Exide has been unwilling to cooperate with the City of Frisco who has shown that Exide has been downplaying the amount of pollution on its site to minimize the cost of the remediation that is required for the site closure. In addition, Frisco's spokesperson Dana Baird, said that the city's estimated $20 million allocated for remediation would not be enough to for the cleanup cost.

== Community's responses ==
Community activists are driving a growing national conversation about environmental justice, the idea that communities of all races and incomes should have the same kind of environmental quality and protection. One of the leaders of this movement, mark! Lopez, received the 2017 Goldman Environmental Prize, for the work he did with his Southeast L.A. based community group, East Yard Communities for Environmental Justice addressing the devastating lead contamination in east and southeast L.A., where the Exide lead–acid battery recycling plant had violated environmental regulations for more than 30 years as state regulators turned a blind eye. Lopez et al. pressured state lawmakers to take action on the Exide plant after decades of complaints about the plant from residents went unanswered.

Community activists and environmental scholars, have effectively argued that major industrial polluters, like Exide, have been able to release massive amounts of pollution by exploiting government inaction regarding poor and minority populations that often live near these major sources of pollution. Specifically, it has been proposed that Exide has been protected by local regulatory agencies so that the company has little responsibility in low-income, minority communities. For example, at a South Coast Air Quality Management District (SCAQMD) board hearing, the mayor of Maywood, Oscar Magana, thought that the Department of Toxic Substances Control and the SCAQMD, would have closed the Exide plant in Vernon much sooner if it had been placed in Beverly Hills, or another affluent community.

== Sears Battery fraud scandal ==
In March 2001, Exide pleaded guilty to conspiracy to commit fraud and agreed to pay a fine of $27.5 million to end a federal criminal investigation into auto battery sales to customers of Sears, Roebuck & Company. The case arose from investigations and accusations that Exide conspired with Sears to sell used batteries as new to Sears customers and that Exide officials had paid bribes to conceal the fraud.

In 2002, two former top executives of Exide Technologies were sentenced to prison for their scheme to sell defective batteries to Sears, Roebuck & Co. Former Exide president Douglas N. Pearson was sentenced to five years and four months in prison and ordered to pay a $150,000 fine. Pearson's accomplice, former Exide chief executive Arthur M. Hawkins, was sentenced to 10 years in prison and ordered to pay a $1 million fine. The two were convicted of wire fraud and conspiracy to commit wire fraud in a huge scheme to sell defective Exide batteries to Sears for its DieHard battery line.

== See also ==
- Lead contamination in Oakland
- Lead contamination in Washington, D.C., drinking water
- Lead poisoning epidemics
- Flint water crisis
- Pemaco Maywood: former chemical mixing facility located on the Los Angeles River
- Porter Ranch gas leak
- Eight Mile, Alabama - site of mercaptan spill
- Superfund sites in California
