= Betts electrolytic process =

Process for purification of lead from bullion

The Betts electrolytic process is an industrial process for purification of lead from bullion. Lead obtained from its ores is impure because lead is a good solvent for many metals. Often these impurities are tolerated, but the Betts electrolytic process is used when high purity lead is required, especially for bismuth-free lead.

== Process description for lead ==
The electrolyte for this process is a mixture of lead fluorosilicate ("PbSiF_{6}") and hexafluorosilicic acid (H_{2}SiF_{6}) operating at 45 °C (113 °F). Cathodes are thin sheets of pure lead and anodes are cast from the impure lead to be purified. A potential of 0.5 volts is applied. At the anode, lead dissolves, as do metal impurities that are less noble than lead. Impurities that are more noble than lead, such as silver, gold, and bismuth, flake from the anode as it dissolves and settle to the bottom of the vessel as "anode mud." Pure metallic lead plates onto the cathode, with the less noble metals remaining in solution. Because of its high cost, electrolysis is used only when very pure lead is needed. Otherwise pyrometallurgical methods are preferred, such as the Parkes process followed by the Betterton-Kroll process.

== History ==
The process is named for its inventor Anson Gardner Betts who filed several patents for this method starting in 1901.

== See also ==
- Processing lead from ore
- Lead smelter
- Electrochemical engineering
