= Betterton–Kroll process =

Industrial process for removing bismuth from lead

The Betterton–Kroll Process is a pyrometallurgical process for refining lead from lead bullion (lead that still contains significant amounts of impurities). Developed by William Justin Kroll in 1922, the Betterton–Kroll process is one of the final steps in conventional lead smelting. After gold, copper, and silver are removed from the lead, significant amounts of bismuth and antimony remain. The Betterton–Kroll process is used to remove these impurities. In the process, calcium and magnesium are added to the molten lead at temperatures around 380 °C. The calcium and magnesium react with the bismuth and antimony in the bullion to form alloys with a higher melting point, which then can be skimmed off of the surface. This process leaves behind lead with less than 0.01 percent bismuth by weight. The process is crucial to cheap industrial lead smelting and offers significant advantages over more expensive processes like the Betts Electrolytic process and fractional crystallization.

== Development ==
In the early 1920s, William Justin Kroll developed a process for removing bismuth from lead by the addition of calcium. However, it was not commercially viable until Jesse Oatman Betterton improved the process by adding magnesium to it, which decreased the total amount of metal required in order to refine the lead.

== Chemical process ==
The key to the Betterton–Kroll process is adding calcium and magnesium metal to molten lead bullion. The metals react with impurities in the lead and form a solid film on the surface, which can be easily removed, leaving behind much purer lead.

=== Metal addition ===
The Betterton–Kroll process begins by heating lead bullion to around 500 °C. A calcium-magnesium alloy is added to the solution, which melts into the bullion in 15–20 minutes. The lead mixture is then cooled to the liquidus point (the lowest temperature that the alloy is completely liquid), which around 320-380 °C. At the lower temperature, the calcium and magnesium react with bismuth and antimony in the lead bullion in the following way:

$\ce{Ca + 2Mg + 2Bi -> CaMg2Bi2(s)}$

$\ce{Ca + 2Mg + 2Sb -> CaMg2Sb2(s)}$

=== Removal of dross ===
The alloys produced have a melting point greater than the rest of the metal, so they form a solid film, or dross, on the surface that can be skimmed off. Molten lead can remain trapped in the dross, so the dross is often hydraulically pressed in order to squeeze out any remaining lead. Through this process, the bismuth in solution can be reduced to under 0.01 wt. %(percent by weight).

=== Bismuth recovery ===
After the dross is skimmed off, it can be treated to recover the bismuth. The most common process for this is chlorination of the calcium-magnesium-bismuth alloy. In the chlorination process, chlorine reacts with other metals in the dross and leaves behind high-purity bismuth.

== Variations and alternatives ==
Although the Betterton–Kroll process is the most widely used method, it has variations and alternatives that can provide advantages for specific use cases.

=== Molten salt reactions ===
Instead of calcium and magnesium metal being added directly to the mixture, oxides of the metals mixed with other molten salts can be added to the solution. Once in the mixture at high temperature, electrodes can be used to decompose the salts into the metal and oxygen gas, so the calcium and magnesium are free to form alloys in the solution. For calcium oxide, the reaction that occurs is:

$\ce{CaO -> Ca + 1/2O2}$

Because the calcium is produced by a reaction and doesn't spend time exposed to air, method prevents loss from oxidation. Another advantage of this method is that salts of calcium are often cheaper than calcium metal.

=== Use of centrifuge ===
Instead of skimming the dross off the top of the molten bullion, the calcium and magnesium can be combined with the lead bullion in a centrifuge. When the centrifuge is spun, the molten lead separates out of the dross more completely than just waiting for the dross to float to the top. This process also removes the need to hydraulically press the dross after extraction because very little lead ends up trapped in the dross.

=== Betts electrolytic process ===
The Betterton–Kroll process can only reduce the bismuth concertation to about 0.01% by mass. If higher purity is required, the Betts Electrolytic process is used. However, due to the significant energy and equipment requirements of the Betts process, the Betterton–Kroll process is preferable if that high level of purity is not needed.

=== Fractional crystallization ===
Another way to separate the bullion is through fractional crystallization and the pattinson process. This process used the different melting points of the metals in the solution in order to separate them out. Through fractional crystallization, the metals silver, copper and bismuth can be separated out of the lead in one step. However, this process is not very effective at removing bismuth because of how close the melting points of lead and bismuth are to each other.

== See also ==
- Lead smelter
- Lead smelting
