= William Justin Kroll =

Luxembourgish metallurgist and inventor

- Born: 24 November 1889; Esch-sur-Alzette, Luxembourg
- Died: 30 March 1973 (aged 83); Brussels, Belgium
- Known for: Kroll process Betterton–Kroll process
- Awards: Francis J. Clamer Medal (1954); Albert Sauveur Achievement Award (1955); Perkin Medal (1958); Castner Medal (1960); National Inventors Hall of Fame (2000)

William Justin Kroll (/kroʊl/; born Guillaume Justin Kroll, Luxembourgish: [kʀol]; November 24, 1889 – March 30, 1973) was a Luxembourgish metallurgist, born in Esch-sur-Alzette. He is best known for inventing the Kroll process in 1940, which is used commercially to extract metallic titanium from ore.

== Early life ==
In 1909, Wilhelm Kroll graduated from Luxembourg's Athenaeum High School, and in 1910, he registered at the faculty of metallurgy at the Technische Hochschule Charlottenburg in Berlin, graduating in 1914. He spent the next four years there to complete his doctoral thesis under the guidance of professor K. A. Hofmann.

== European years ==
Working in Germany, in 1918, Kroll invented a very efficient bearing alloy based on lead, commercialized under the name Lurgi metal, and he was awarded various metallurgy related patents. In Austria in 1922, he developed alloys known as Alusil and Alsia used primarily for cast-aluminum pistons. In 1923, Kroll returned to Luxembourg and set up a private laboratory.

Kroll invented precipitation hardening (PH) stainless steel in 1929, when he added a small amount of titanium to stainless steel and strengthened it by thermally precipitating TiC particles.

In the 1930s he began focusing on the study of titanium and its alloys. At the time, titanium as a metal was a laboratory curiosity. In 1938, titanium was machined for the first time at the Luuchtefabrik compound in Bereldange, Luxembourg.

== American years ==
Kroll visited the US, arriving in New York aboard the SS Queen Mary from Cherbourg, France on October 18, 1938. He called on various US non-ferrous industries, showing his titanium samples, but there was little to no interest in titanium at the time. Disappointed, he returned to Luxembourg. As the Nazi cloud began to spread over Germany in 1940 Kroll elected to emigrate to the United States. He arrived in New York on February 22, 1940, having sailed from Rotterdam aboard the SS Volendam on February 10, 1940. On May 10, 1940, German troops invaded Luxembourg, occupying the country for the next four years.

On June 25, 1940, the United States Patent and Trademark Office awarded U.S. patent 2,205,854 for Kroll's method of manufacturing titanium and alloys thereof, filed on July 6, 1938. On December 4, 1940, Kroll applied for US citizenship. He worked as a consulting engineer for Union Carbide Research Laboratories at Niagara Falls, New York. As the US declared war on the Axis nations in December 1941, Kroll's patent was forfeited by the US government as falling under the Alien Property Custodian Act prompting a seven-year litigation, ending in favor of Kroll, though litigation fees of over $1 million ate up the compensation awarded. Slowly the US government and the industry began to recognize the potential of titanium. The US government established a research center in Boulder, Colorado in 1944, and in late 1948, Dupont de Nemours began the commercial production of titanium using the Kroll process.

Meanwhile, Kroll's focus had turned to zirconium. He became a consulting metallurgist to the United States, Department of the Interior, Bureau of Mines in 1945 at their research facility at Albany, Oregon. The first zirconium strip was rolled out there in August 1946. In 1951, William Kroll joined the faculty of Oregon State College, established a non-profit Metal Research Foundation awarding scholarships and grants in the US and in Europe.

== Death and legacy ==
William J. Kroll returned to Europe in 1961 where he died in Brussels on March 30, 1973.

One of his lasting legacies in the United States is the Kroll Institute at the Colorado School of Mines, Golden, Colorado, established in 1974:

"The Kroll Institute for Extractive Metallurgy (KIEM) was established in 1974 in accordance with a bequest from William J. Kroll, world-renowned extractive metallurgist best known for his inventions of processes for the production of titanium and zirconium. The financial resources of Dr. Kroll's bequest were intended to provide for the establishment of a Center for Excellence in Extractive Metallurgy at the Colorado School of Mines. Since its inception, the Kroll Institute has provided financial support to both undergraduate and graduate students at CSM, many of whom, subsequently, have made important contributions, nationally and internationally, to the fields of mining, minerals, metals and advanced materials."

== Honors and awards ==
Kroll was posthumously inducted into the National Inventors Hall of Fame in 2000.

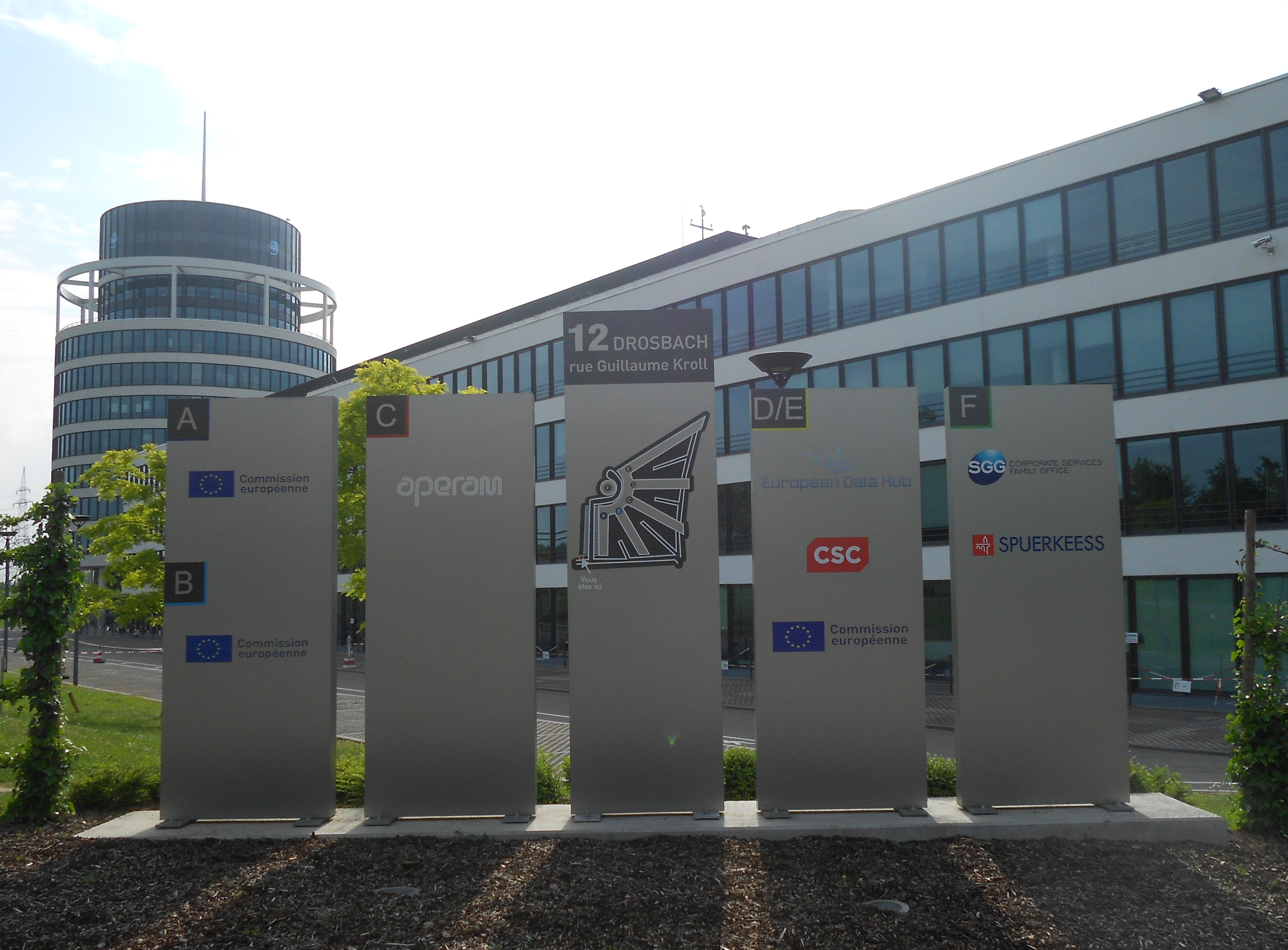
The Centre Drosbach in Luxembourg is located at the rue Guillaume Kroll

Among his other awards were the Francis J. Clamer Medal in 1954, the Albert Sauveur Achievement Award from the American Society for Metals in 1955 and the Perkin Medal in 1958. He was also awarded the Acheson Award by the Electrochemical Society in 1958.

Kroll has a street named after him in Luxembourg City, in the business district of Gasperich, and in Esch-sur-Alzette.

In September 2018, a vocational high school in Esch/Alzette in Luxembourg, Lycée technique d'Esch-sur-Alzette, changed its name to Lycée Guillaume-Kroll.
