= Lead contamination in Oakland =

Excess lead in soil and water of Oakland, California

Lead contamination in Oakland represents a serious and persistent public health threat. Lead contamination in modern Oakland comes from three primary sources: remnants from previous industry, deposits from leaded gasoline, and paint chips from leaded paints. Significant portions of the city of Oakland, California, have soil lead levels far in excess of 400 ppm, the level at which the US EPA suggests remedial action be taken, and far higher than 80 ppm, the level at which California's Office of Environmental Health Hazard Assessment suggests action should be taken. Not all areas of Oakland are affected equally: West Oakland's contamination is especially severe, particularly near the former Oakland Army Base, and many of Oakland's poorer neighborhoods also suffer disproportionately (since residents often lack the socioeconomic resources to remediate their lawns, or even to repaint their houses).

High blood levels of lead have been linked to a wide variety of health problems, including severe gastrointestinal, neuromuscular, and neurological symptoms. These problems are especially significant in children, and childhood lead poisoning can lead to behavioral problems, developmental disorders, and permanent decreases in IQ.

== Historical context ==
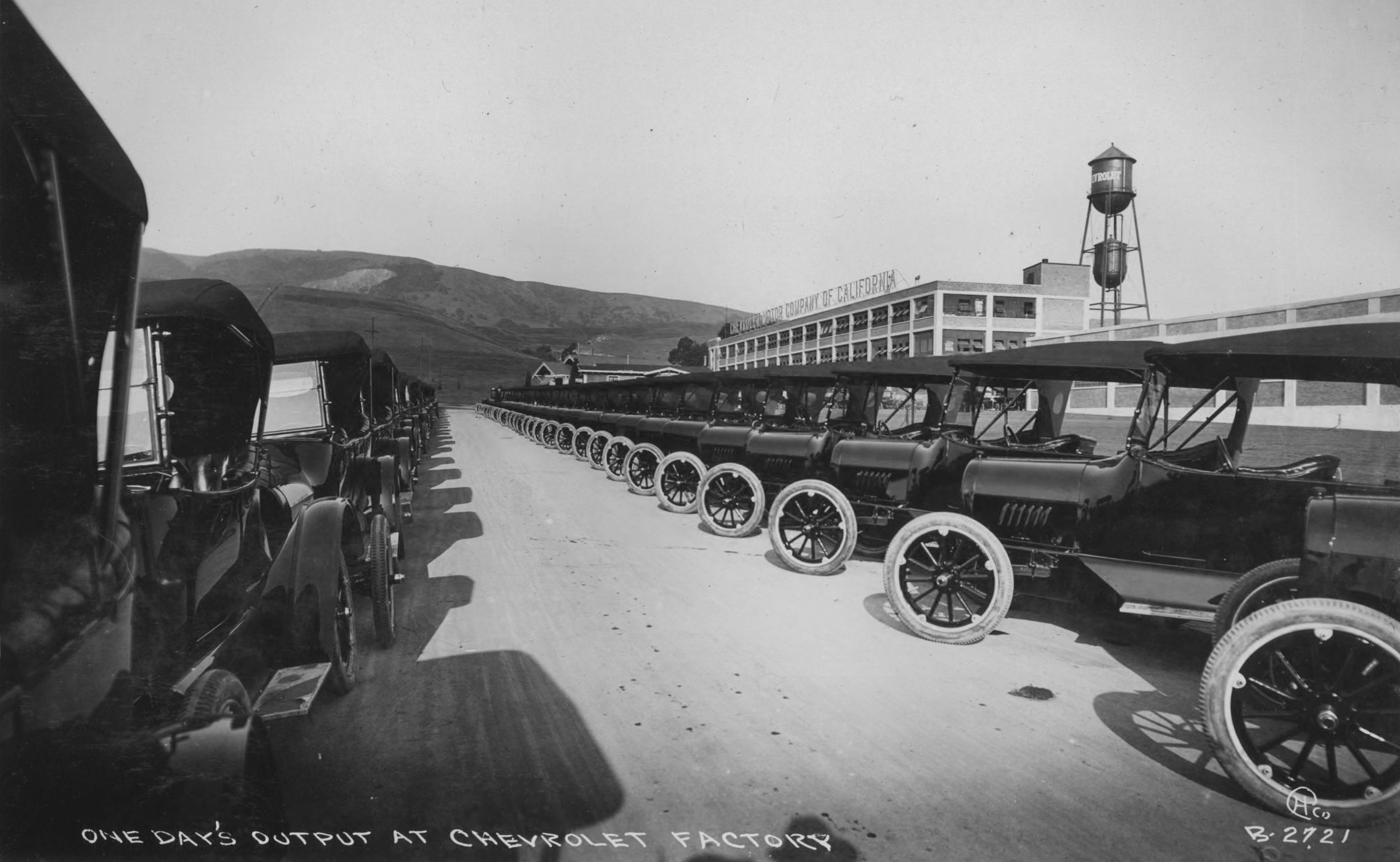
Oakland has long been a center of industry, serving for a time as home of the main Pacific Coast Chevrolet auto plant.

Oakland was a center of heavy industry but much of this industry left the city during the 1980s and early 1990s. This loss of a large number of well-paying blue collar jobs led to a significant decline in the financial situation of many Oaklanders, and most of the closed manufacturing plants did not perform environmental remediation before shutting down, leaving many former industrial areas heavily polluted with lead and other contaminants. The Port of Oakland is the fourth busiest port in the United States in terms of container traffic, and Oakland was also historically one of the largest rail hubs on the west coast of the United States.

Oakland was also an early center of car culture, and extensive highway development began to take place starting in the 1950s. Leaded gasoline was in widespread use in the United States for much of the 20th century, with lead levels gradually being reduced starting in the early 1970s, and leaded gasoline finally being completely banned in 1996. The use of leaded gasoline contributed greatly to lead contamination in Oakland, especially in areas of the city near its highways.

Lead-based paints were commonly used in Oakland until its ban in 1978, and as many as 85,000 still extant houses built in Oakland in that time period likely used lead paint. Paint chips or dust from pre-1978 paint contributes greatly to lead pollution in Oakland. A variety of lead paint abatement programs are available in Oakland run by local governments and non-profits, but most have been of limited impact.

== Specific areas ==
=== Oakland public schools ===
See also: Lead contamination in Oakland public schools

In 2024, lead contamination was discovered in many of Oakland's public schools. The detection of the lead contamination was not immediately communicated to the public and has not yet to be remediated. The highest rates of lead contamination was found at Lincoln Elementary, Crocker Highlands Elementary, Cleveland Elementary, and Edna Brewer Middle School. At Crocker Highlands Elementary, lead contamination exceeding thresholds was found in 50% of the water fixtures, with the highest level of contamination detected being 440 parts per billion.

=== West Oakland ===
==== Oakland Army Base ====
The former Oakland Army Base, closed in 1999, is significantly polluted by a variety of substances, including lead. Sources of lead contamination include the weathering of lead-based paint, repainting vehicles, leaded gasoline, and other factors. During the time period when the Army was remediating the base, many areas of the base failed to meet their remediation goals.

==== Amco ====
There was formerly a large chemical distribution facility run by AMCO Chemical at 1414 3rd Street, just one block south of the West Oakland BART station. From the 1960s until 1989, bulk chemicals were off-loaded from a rail spur onsite and stored in drums and storage tanks before being transferred to smaller containers for resale. Bulk chemical storage facilities included 12 aboveground tanks, two underground tanks, and numerous drums. AMCO's operations heavily contaminated the surrounding area with a variety of compounds, included chlorinated solvents, vinyl chloride, dioxins, PCBs volatile organic compounds, arsenic, manganese, and significant quantities of lead. Some of these compounds have either contaminated nearby properties, seeped into the ground water, or both. The facility has been declared a federal superfund site.

Soil lead levels both at the AMCO site itself and at many nearby residential properties exceed safety limits, and pose a threat to human safety. Most other contaminants stemming from the AMCO plant have not spread as widely as the lead has. As with most other lead contaminated areas, other sources of lead exist, such as lead paint and leaded gasoline.

==== South Prescott ====
South Prescott is a hundred year old neighborhood in West Oakland; due to past industrial activity and leaded gas neighborhood soil averaged 800 ppm lead before a major EPA-led cleanup. Some of the most contaminated areas of the neighborhood had soil lead levels in excess of 2,700 ppm. The EPA-led cleanup used ground up bones from pollock to convert elemental lead in the soil to pyromorphite, a compound that is harmless even if it is ingested. The cleanup successfully remediated around 95% of residential properties in South Prescott, as well as all public right-of-ways.

==== Cypress Freeway ====
The Cypress Street Viaduct was an unconventional raised two-tiered portion of the Nimitz Freeway that ran through a 1.6 miles (2.6 km) stretch of Oakland, bordering South Prescott. The viaduct had been routed through a socio-economically depressed neighborhood originally, and during its construction community groups raised objections that it would destroy an existing vibrant neighborhood, and suggested that a freeway route would not be proposed in a similar way in a wealthier community. Since leaded gasoline was not banned in the US until 1996, traffic through the original viaduct resulted in neighborhoods surrounding it becoming heavily contaminated with lead.

The viaduct was extensively damaged during the 1989 Loma Prieta earthquake. As part of its earthquake relief efforts, the federal government allocated some $700 million to reconstruct the viaduct, with its route shifted somewhat to the west into another pre-existing neighborhood. A variety of community groups led by the Church of the Living God Faith Tabernacle and the Clean Air Alternative Coalition filed suit against the federal government in 1993 in an effort to require the reconstruction of the viaduct to reposition it in a way that would minimize its effect on the surrounding community, arguing that its suggested placement would have a disproportionate effect on predominately minority communities, including placing a heavy load of lead and other pollutants on them. The lawsuit was not successful, but an out of court settlement did somewhat alter the placement of the reconstructed freeway.

=== East Oakland ===
==== Verdese Carter Park ====
Verdese Carter Park is a municipal park at the corner of 96th Avenue and Bancroft, in the Elmhurst district of East Oakland, a primarily African-American and Latino community where most residents are below the poverty line. Between 1912 and 1975 the bottom half of the site was occupied by a plant that broke open used batteries and melted their lead to manufacture new batteries, while the top half of the site was occupied by a greenhouse. Both properties were acquired by the City of Oakland in 1976, and, after two actions aimed at removing lead contaminated soil, the park opened to the public in 1978. Before the initial city removal actions, testing found as much as 100,000 ppm lead in the soil of the park.

These removal actions were ineffective at making the park safe, particularly because the protective dome the city installed had not been maintained or checked and had cracked. In 1993, the African American Development Organization lead a drive to force the government to evaluate the safety of the park, after a yellow-white substance had begun to ooze out of cracks in basketball courts in the park. Later that same year, the City of Oakland fenced off the park and began testing the area, the EPA was also involved. The EPA's evaluation of the site found that soil lead levels as high as 6,700 ppm were still present in the park, as well as zinc levels in excess of 7,450 ppm, and arsenic levels in excess of 700 ppm. The evaluation also found that residential properties within seven blocks of the park also had significantly elevated levels of lead, in some cases as high as 10,000 ppm. (84% of houses in the area were built before 1950, and were thus extant while the battery plant was still operational.) Elevated levels of lead, presumably from the park, were also found at a nearby elementary school. Although much of the contamination in these areas was likely due to the park, lead paint and leaded gas from nearby highways probably contributed to the contamination as well. An additional series of actions were taken by joint local, state, and federal agencies between 1993 and 1996 aimed to remediate the park and surrounding residential properties. The park reopened in 1996, and cleanup of all nearby residential properties with a soil lead concentration >1000 ppm was performed by AlliedSignal (the owner of the plant, and its final completion was agreed to by the EPA in 2001 in a way that absolved AlliedSignal of any future liability.

==== AB&I Foundry ====
AB&I Foundry was an iron foundry located in East Oakland at 7825 San Leandro Street. It started operating in 1906, with its location selected by Joseph Boscacci after the earthquake in San Francisco. The plant, owned and operated by McWane, manufactured cast iron materials and equipment used for drainage and plumbing systems. After multiple complaints about bad odor and unsafe emissions, California Attorney General Rob Bonta filed a lawsuit for the state in February 2022, alleging that AB&I failed to warn the community about its emissions as required by state law. In March 2022, the foundry announced it would close and relocate its operations to Texas, citing the state's less stringent environmental regulations. In July 2024, California came to a $2.5 million settlement with McWane, and the federal Environmental Protection Agency issued a $274 thousand fine against AB&I in November 2024.

== See also ==
- Exide lead contamination in the U.S. from battery recycling
- Lead poisoning epidemics
- Superfund sites in California
