= 2025 Tianshui kindergarten lead poisoning scandal =

Food safety scandal in China

- Venue: Heshi Peixin Kindergarten, Maiji, Tianshui, Gansu, China
- Type: Lead poisoning
- Outcome: 247 children affected

A kindergarten in Maiji district, Tianshui, Gansu province, China, caused a major lead poisoning scandal in 2025. An official investigation found that food served at the kindergarten had been contaminated with pigments containing lead 2,000 times the national safety standard, resulting in abnormally high blood lead levels in 247 children and dozens of staff members.

The incident attracted nationwide and international attention due to the large number of affected children, the deliberate use of non-food-grade materials in meals, and later medical data falsification. Evidence that authorities and medical institutions concealed abnormal test results or ignored earlier warning signs further eroded public trust in government oversight. The case also raised widespread public concern that it was related to an unsolved 2006 lead poisoning incident that poisoned 200. (Note: Some attributed the doubt to a 2006 mass contamination incident in nearby Shuiyang township, Hui county, Gansu province, with 2000 residents, including 300 children.) In response to the growing concerns, the government ultimately conducted additional environmental surveys in the surrounding area.

== Background ==
Established in 2022, Heshi Peixin Kindergarten (褐石培心幼兒園) was a private kindergarten located in Maiji district, Tianshui. At the time of the incident, the kindergarten enrolled 251 children. The same major investor also controlled another nearby kindergarten (慧凡渭北幼兒園).

The Chinese national safety standard states that 100 microgram per liter (μg/L) for blood lead exposure and 200 microgram per litre for lead poisoning. Lead poisoning can cause severe and irreversible harm to children. Lead accumulates in the brain, organs, bones, and teeth, permanently impairing brain development, and high exposure can severely damage the central nervous system. There is no known safe level of lead exposure.

== Incidents ==
=== Discovery ===
As early as the beginning of the school term that year, some children were already frequently experiencing symptoms such as abdominal pain, diarrhea, nausea, leg pain, and blackened teeth. After several parents took their children for medical examinations, abnormal blood lead levels were discovered. As more parents subsequently had their children tested, and as many of the affected children attended the same kindergarten, parents gradually came to suspect that the elevated blood lead levels were linked to the kindergarten.

On 1 July, abnormally high blood lead levels were identified in 20 children. Only after members of the public filed complaints with the Maiji regulartory authorities did they begin an official investigation. The same day, the kindergarten notified parents to have a group blood test. However, because the testing was conducted collectively and results were only communicated verbally without individual reports, many parents remained concerned and took their children to Xi'an for further testing. Some teachers and parents of another nearby kindergarten (慧凡渭北幼儿园), which has the same major investor, went along.

On 6 July, dozens of parents received testing reports in Xi'an Central Hospital and learned that all 70 (Note: In total, 74 children were tested, 2 were siblings of the affected students, the other 2 were students from another nearby kindergarten (慧凡渭北幼儿园) with the same major investor.) children studying in the kindergarten had blood lead levels of at least 206 microgram per liter (μg/L), 3 had greater than 500 microgram, and the highest being 528.

=== 8 July announcements ===
On 8 July, the Tianshui government announced that testings shown 233 children had high blood lead levels out of 251 tested, along with several teachers. Their investigation revealed that kindergarten staff deliberately added painting pigments to food served to children and staff in order to enhance the appearance of baked goods. The red date cake and corn sausage rolls contained lead concentrations of 1,052 mg/kg and 1,340 mg/kg, exceeding national safety standard by more than 2,000 times. They concluded that the kindergarten principal, with approval from the main investor, ordered the use of pigments to improve the visual appeal of food for promotional photos and videos shared with parents, in an effort to attract more enrollments and increase revenue.

Parents and online commentators questioned the credibility of the government investigation, particularly after reports of large discrepancies between blood lead test results conducted in Tianshui and those obtained independently in Xi'an, while local test data were not publicly released. Allegations of censored discussion, unclear explanations for the severity of poisoning, and doubts over the official claim that contaminated food was the sole source further fueled skepticism. Public suspicion was intensified by memories of an unresolved mass lead poisoning case in Tianshui in 2006, reinforcing concerns about recurring environmental and regulatory failures.

== Arrests and accountability ==
On 8 July, eight individuals, including the kindergarten principal, investor, and kitchen staff, were arrested on charges related to producing and serving toxic food.

The Gansu government launched an official investigation into the provincial Center for Disease Control and Prevention, and the unauthorized alteration of blood lead test results by Tianshui Second People's Hospital over the incident and the medical data falsification. At least 10 other officials from education, health, market regulation, and local government bodies were placed under investigation.

== Trial ==
On 16 October 2026, The Lanzhou Intermediate People's Court sentenced Li Huifang, the operator of the kindergarten, to life imprisonment and ordered to confiscate 500,000 yuan of her personal assets. Zhu Jinglin, the kindergarten's executive principal, was sentenced to 15 years in prison with a 300,000 yuan fine. Four kitchen staff were sentenced to prison terms of between six and eight years.

== See also ==
- Lead poisoning epidemics
