= Jesse Oatman Betterton =

American metallurgist

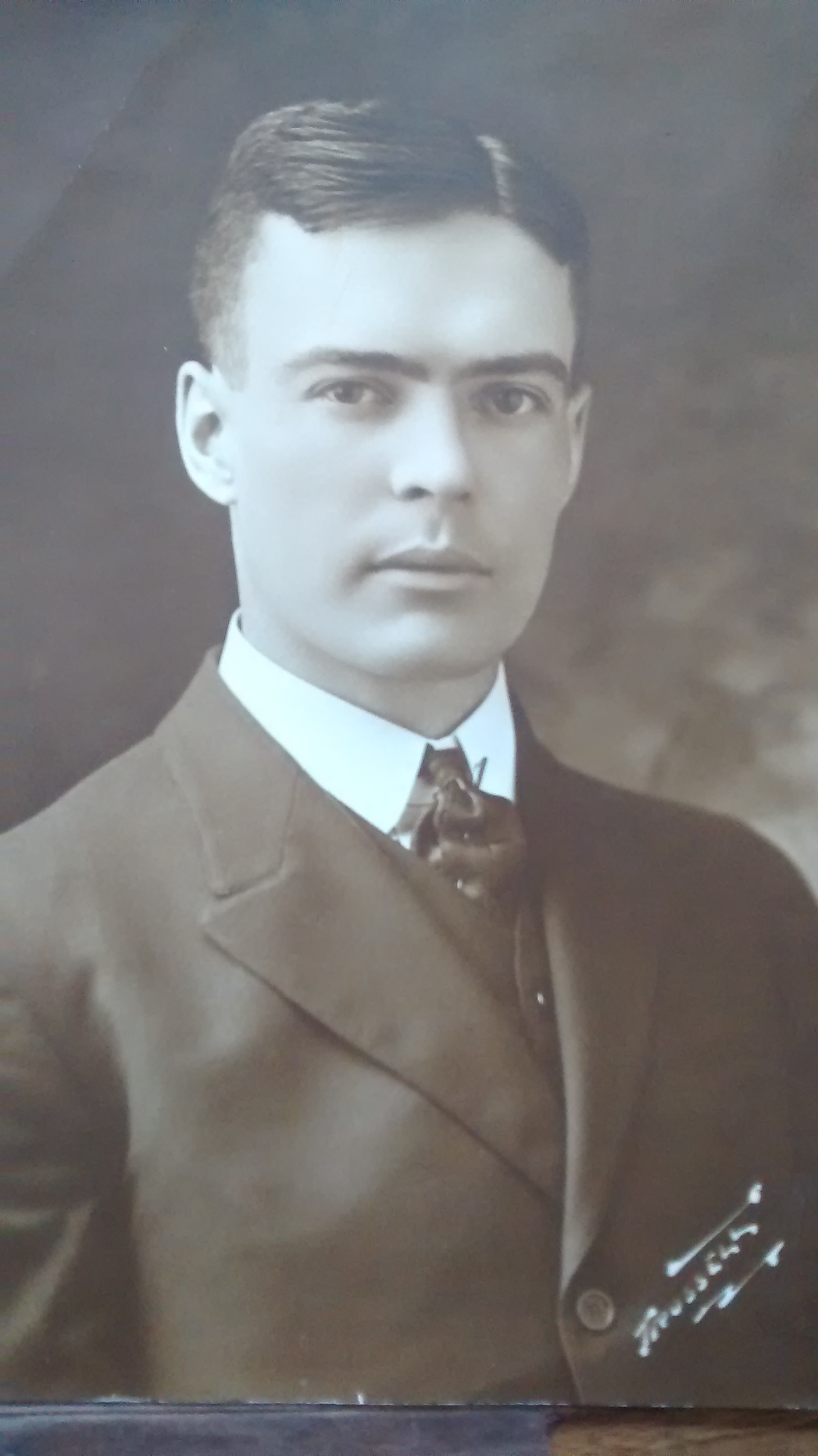
Photograph of Jesse Oatman Betterton as a young man. From Betty Betterton Addamiano archives.

Jesse Oatman Betterton (1884–1960) was an American metallurgist. He developed the Betterton–Kroll process, an industrial process for removing bismuth from lead. in the 1930s.

== Biography ==
Born in Porter County, Indiana in 1884. He graduated from Kouts School (Kouts, Indiana) in 1898. The family moved to Columbus, Nebraska, where he graduated from Columbus High School in 1905. He attended the South Dakota School of Mines (Rapid City, South Dakota) and earned a "B.S. in Met. Engin., 1909; Met E., 1912." During the summer breaks in college he gathered practical mining experience in Butte, Montana, and Lead, South Dakota.

In 1909–1910, he worked for the Leesburg Mining Company in Leesburg, Idaho, doing assaying and surveying. In 1914 he was living in Omaha, Nebraska, and working as foreman at the American Smelting & Refining Co. By 1915, he was working in Collinsville, Illinois, as "Supt. Basic-Sulphate and Blast-Furnace departments, St. Louis Smelting and Refining Company." St. Louis Smelting and Refining Company was a subsidiary of National Lead Co. In 1915, he was also nominated to membership in the American Institute of Mining Engineers.

Betterton was married to Mary Walsh Dean on June 16, 1916. They had two children, Betty (1918) and Jesse Jr. (1920).
