= Lead smelting =

Process of refining lead metal

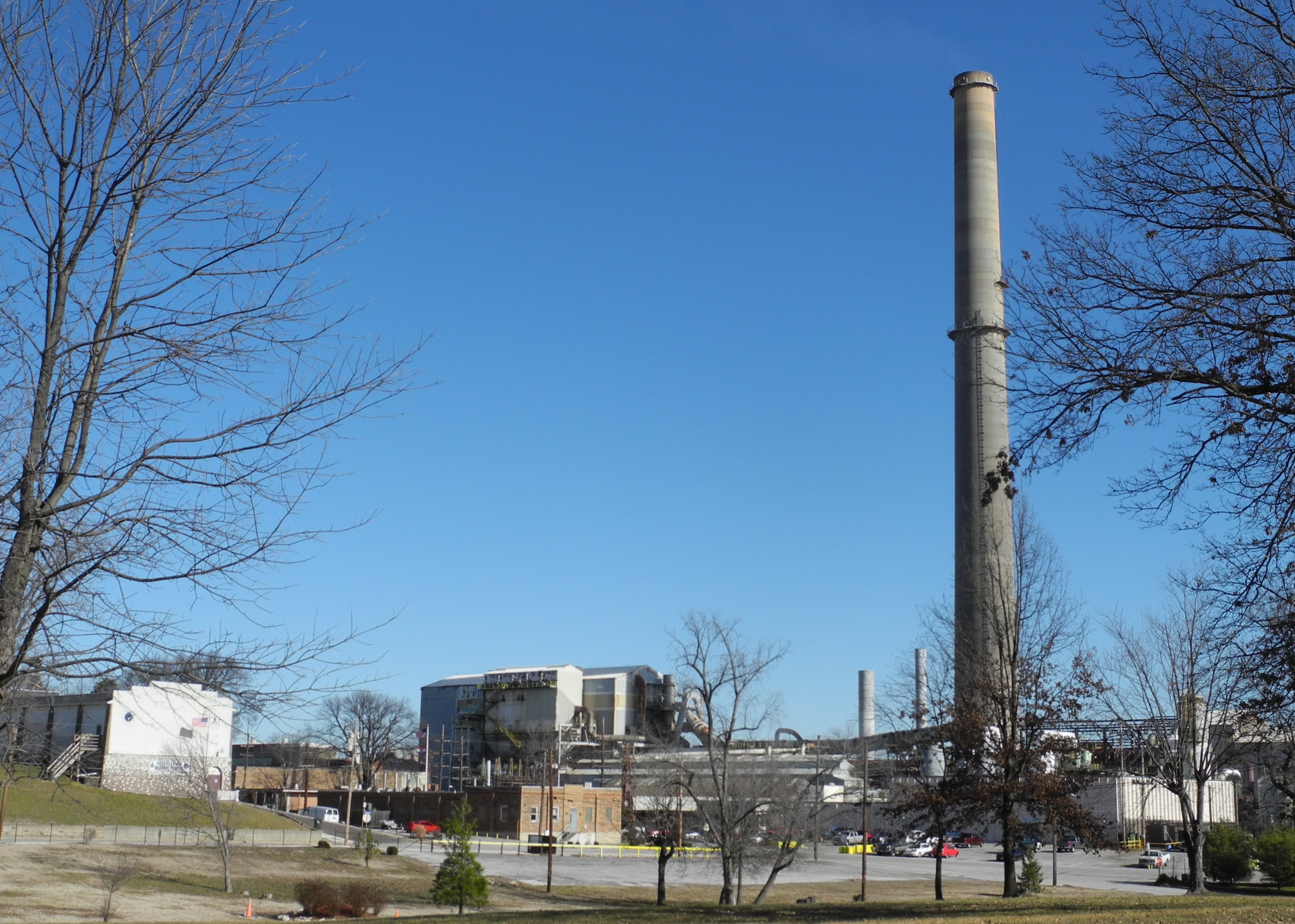
The now closed Doe Run primary lead smelting facility in Herculaneum, Missouri

Plants for the production of lead are generally referred to as lead smelters.

Primary lead production begins with sintering. Concentrated lead ore is fed into a sintering machine with iron, silica, limestone fluxes, coke, soda ash, pyrite, zinc, caustics or pollution control particulates. Smelting uses suitable reducing substances that will combine with those oxidizing elements to free the metal. Reduction is the final, high-temperature step in smelting. It is here that the oxide becomes the elemental metal. A reducing environment (often provided by carbon monoxide in an air-starved furnace) pulls the final oxygen atoms from the raw metal.

Lead is usually smelted in a blast furnace, using the lead sinter produced in the sintering process and coke to provide the heat source. As melting occurs, several layers form in the furnace. A combination of molten lead and slag sinks to the bottom of the furnace, with a layer of the lightest elements referred to as speiss, including arsenic and antimony floating to the top of the molten material. The crude bullion and lead slag layers flow out of the 'furnace front' and into the 'forehearth', where the two streams are separated. The lead slag stream, containing most of the 'fluxing' elements added to the sintering machine (predominantly silica, limestone, iron and zinc) can either be discarded or further processed to recover the contained zinc.

The crude lead bullion, containing significant quantities of copper will then undergo 'copper drossing'. In this step elemental sulphur, usually in solid form is added to the molten crude lead bullion to react with the contained copper. A "matte" layer forms in this step, containing most of the copper originating from the crude lead bullion and some other impurities as metal sulfides. The speiss and the matte are usually sold to copper smelters where they are refined for copper processing.

The lead from the blast furnace, called lead bullion, then undergoes the drossing process. The bullion is agitated in kettles then cooled to 700–800 degrees. This process results in molten lead and dross. Dross refers to the lead oxides, copper, antimony and other elements that float to the top of the lead. Dross is usually skimmed off and sent to a dross furnace to recover the non-lead components which are sold to other metal manufacturers. The Parkes process is used to separate silver or gold from lead.

Finally, the molten lead is refined. Pyrometallurgical methods are usually used to remove the remaining non-lead components of the mixture, for example the Betterton-Kroll process and the Betts electrolytic process. The non-lead metals are usually sold to other metal processing plants. The refined lead may be made into alloys or directly cast.

People who operate or work in such plants are also referred to as smelters or casters.

== Lead ores ==
Evolution of the extracted lead ores grade in different countries (Canada, Australia).

Galena, the most common mineral of lead, is primarily lead sulfide (PbS). The sulfide is oxidized to a sulfite (PbSO_{3}) which thermally decomposes into lead oxide and sulfur dioxide gas. (PbO and SO_{2}) The sulfur dioxide (like the carbon dioxide in the example above) is expelled, and the lead oxide is reduced. Anglesite, Cerussite, Pyromorphite, Mimetite and Wulfenite are other lead ores.

Other elements frequently present with lead ores include zinc and silver.

== Secondary lead processing ==
Most of the lead produced comes from secondary sources. Lead scrap includes lead-acid batteries, cable coverings, pipes, sheets and lead coated, or terne bearing, metals. Solder, product waste and dross may also be recovered for its small lead content. Most secondary lead is used in batteries.

To recover lead from a battery, the battery is broken and the components are classified. The lead containing components are processed in blast furnaces for hard lead or rotary reverberatory furnaces for fine particles. The blast furnace is similar in structure to a cupola furnace used in iron foundries. The furnace is charged with slag, scrap iron, limestone, coke, oxides, dross, and reverberatory slag. The coke is used to melt and reduce the lead. Limestone reacts with impurities and floats to the top. This process also keeps the lead from oxidizing. The molten lead flows from the blast furnace into holding pots. Lead may be mixed with alloys, including antimony, tin, arsenic, copper and nickel. It is then cast into ingots.

== Lead exposure ==
Humans have been smelting lead for thousands of years, poisoning themselves in the process. Although lead poisoning is one of the oldest known work and environmental hazards, the modern understanding of the small amount of lead necessary to cause harm did not come about until the latter half of the 20th century. No safe threshold for lead exposure has been discovered—that is, there is no known amount of lead that is too small to cause the body harm.

The US Centers for Disease Control and Prevention and the World Health Organization state that a blood lead level of 10 μg/dL or above is a cause for concern; however, lead may impair development and have harmful health effects even at lower levels, and there is no known safe exposure level. Authorities such as the American Academy of Pediatrics define lead poisoning as blood lead levels higher than 10 μg/dL.

Lead smelters with little pollution controls contribute to several environmental problems, especially raised blood lead levels in the surrounding population. The problem is particularly significant in many children who have grown up in the proximity to a lead smelter.

== History ==
The earliest known cast lead beads were thought found in the Çatalhöyük site in Anatolia (Turkey), and dated from about 6500 BC. They were later identified in fact to be made from cerussite and galena, minerals rich in, but distinct from, lead. Ancient smelting was done using loads of lead ore and charcoal in outdoor hearths and furnaces.

Although lead is a common metal, its discovery had relatively little impact in the ancient world. It is too soft to be used for weapons (except possibly as sling projectiles) or for structural elements. However, being easy to cast and shape, it came to be extensively used in the classical world of Ancient Greece and Ancient Rome for piping and storage of water. It was also used as a mortar in stone buildings, and as a writing material. Smeltmills were water-powered mills used to smelt lead or other metals. The Roman lead smelting has led to evidence of global pollution. Greenland ice cores from 500 BC to 300 AD show measurably elevated lead content in the atmosphere. Researchers studying an ice core from Colle Gnifetti, in the Swiss part of the Monte Rosa massif, have found that higher historical European airborne lead pollution levels are associated with changes in the monetary system from gold to silver from the year 640 AD, with the principal source likely to be the Melle mines in France. Later airborne pollution, between the years 1170 and 1216, correlates even more strongly with contemporaneous records of lead and silver production from mines in the Peak District of England, at levels similar to those seen in the Industrial Revolution.

Georgius Agricola (1494–1555) presented details of lead smelting methods and facilities current in Europe in the first half of the 16th century in Book IX of his treatise on mining and metallurgy, De Re Metallica. Methods ranged from primitive open-hearth arrangements (essentially bonfires on which lead ore was piled) to blast furnaces capable of continuous operation.

In the US there are 400 forgotten lead smelting firms that operated in the 1930s to 1960s and may have deposited dangerous levels of lead contamination in nearby soil.

=== Historic mining and smelting sites ===
==== Asia ====
- Gazimursky Zavod
- Bupyeong silver mine

==== Australia ====
- Boolaroo, New South Wales
- Argenton, New South Wales
- Cockle Creek Smelter

==== Europe ====
- Grinton Smelt Mill, North Yorkshire, England
- Milford, Derbyshire
- Mendip Hills
- Wirksworth
- The tin and lead smelter in Arnhem, the Netherlands, was shut down in the 1990s.
- Upper Harz, Germany
- Copșa Mică works, Transylvania
- Rammelsberg, Germany
- Ballycorus Leadmines
- Dalnegorsk
- Eas Anie
- Silberhütte (Harzgerode)

==== North America ====
- Noonday Camp, California
- Tri-State district (SE Kansas, SW Missouri, NE Oklahoma)
- Southeast Missouri Lead District
- Old Mines, Missouri
- ASARCO Murray, Utah
- Midvale, Utah
- International Smelting and Refining Company Tooele, Utah
- Silver City, Utah
- Carondelet, St. Louis
- Bunker Hill Mine and Smelting Complex, Idaho
- Ketchum, Idaho
- El Paso, Texas
- Dewey-Humboldt, Arizona
- Priest Mine, Canada
- Cerro Gordo Mines
- Butte, Montana
- Harbor Island (Seattle)
- Sinsinawa, Wisconsin
- East Chicago, Indiana

== Active lead mines and smelters ==
=== Africa ===
- Kitwe, Zambia

=== Australia ===
- Nyrstar Port Pirie
- Broken Hill, New South Wales
- Mount Isa Mines

=== Asia ===
- Chanderiya Smelter Complex in the Chittorgarh district of Rajasthan state of India

=== Europe ===
- Rönnskär copper smelter is in Skelleftehamn, Sweden and its main products are copper, zinc clinker, lead and precious metals.
- Bergsöe lead smelter outside Landskrona in southern Sweden extracts lead from scrap car batteries.
- Tara Mine
- KCM in Plovdiv which has produced lead for over 60 years using a blast furnace and is now in the process of bringing a new 60 million euro smelter TSL furnace online in order to replace the ageing blast furnace.

=== North America ===
- Doe Run Resources Corporation is the largest integrated lead producer in North America and the largest primary lead producer in the western world.
- Hayden Smelter, Arizona
- Belledune, New Brunswick
- Red Dog mine, Alaska
- Teck Trail Operations, Trail, BC, Canada.
- ECOBAT RESOURCES, NEW YORK, CALIFORNIA, INDIANA

=== South America ===
- La Oroya
- Cerro de Pasco, Peru

== See also ==
- 2009 Chinese lead poisoning scandal
- Aluminium smelting
- Cast iron
- Desloge Lead Company
- Mining in Roman Britain
- Mining in Tajikistan
- Mining in the United Kingdom
- Molybdomancy
- Trail Smelter dispute
- Zinc smelting
