= 2009 Hunan lead poisoning scandal =

Lead poisoning incident in Hunan, China

A manganese smelting plant in Wenping township, Wugang, Hunan, China, caused lead poisoning in at least 1,354 children, triggering widespread fear and public outrage. Local government attempted to cover up the incident.

It was exposed shortly after another mass lead contamination in Fengxiang District, Shaanxi, which affected 851 children. The two incidents involved over 2,000 children in the same year.

== Background ==
Western Hunan is rich in mineral resources, making it an attractive location for smelting and metal-processing facilities, with at least three lead smelters operating in Hunan Province at the time. This development occurred amid China's rapid industrial expansion, in which economic growth was frequently accompanied by inadequate environmental oversight, especially in poorer districts. The water or air pollution can gradually build up in an area.

In May 2008, the Wugang Manganese Smelting Plant, located in Wenping town, began operation without formal approval from environmental protection authorities. The facility was situated within 500 metres of a kindergarten, a primary school, and a middle school.

== Incidents ==
In early July 2009, medical examinations revealed that children from nearby villages near the smelting plant had abnormally high levels of lead in their blood. Many had 200 microgram per liter, twice the national standard. After the initial exposure, the local government attempted to contain the incident by refusing to arrange blood tests for children. Villager brought their children to several hospitals in Wugang, but were turned away using various excuses, such as electricity shortages, mechanical failures, etc. They even went to nearby cities, including Hengyang, Xinning, and Guilin, but to no avail.

Public concern quickly escalated into unrest. On 8 August 2009, around 1,000 villagers protested near the smelter, blocking roads and overturning a police vehicle after accusing local authorities of ignoring repeated complaints, suppressing information, and failing to address demands for free medical testing, treatment and compensation.

According to Xinhua News Agency, subsequent testing of nearly 2,000 children showed that between 60% and 70% had blood lead levels exceeding 100 micrograms per litre, the upper safety limit under Chinese standards.

By 18 August 2009, authorities reported that 1,354 children had suspected elevated blood lead levels out of 1,958 tested. Among them, dozens were diagnosed with mild to moderate lead poisoning, and several required medical treatment. Lead exposure could cause anaemia, neurological damage, developmental delays, and other long-term health effects, particularly in children.

== Government response ==
Following national media coverage and public pressure, authorities ordered the immediate shutdown of the Wugang Manganese Smelting Plant. Over hundred plants were paused. Two company executives were arrested with another suspect wanted, and two local environmental protection officials were placed under formal investigation.

The Wugang municipal government announced that the plant had engaged in illegal production and excessive lead emissions. Free medical testing was offered to all residents who live within 2.5 km from the plant. The Wugang municipal government's initial proposal for compensation of several hundred yuan per child was refused by the villagers.

== See also ==
- Pollution in China
- 2009 Shaanxi lead poisoning scandal
