= Parkes process =

Pyrometallurgical industrial process for removing silver from lead

The Parkes process is a pyrometallurgical industrial process for removing silver from lead during the production of bullion. It is an example of liquid–liquid extraction.

The process takes advantage of two liquid-state properties of zinc. The first is that zinc is immiscible with lead, and the other is that silver is 3000 times more soluble in zinc than it is in lead. When zinc is added to liquid lead that contains silver as a contaminant, the silver preferentially migrates into the zinc. Because the zinc is immiscible in the lead it remains in a separate layer and is easily removed. The zinc-silver solution is then heated until the zinc vaporizes, leaving nearly pure silver. If gold is present in the liquid lead, it can also be removed and isolated by the same process.

The process was patented by Alexander Parkes in 1850. Parkes received two additional patents in 1852.

The Parkes process was not adopted in the United States, due to the low native production of lead. The problems were overcome during the 1880s and by 1923 only when the Parkes process was used.

== See also ==
- Lead smelter
- Patio process
- Pattison's Process
