= Pattinson's process =

Pattinson's process or pattinsonisation is a method for removing silver from lead, discovered by Hugh Lee Pattinson in 1829 and patented in 1833.

The process is dependent on the fact that lead which has least silver in it solidifies first on liquefaction, leaving the remaining liquid richer in silver.

In practice several crystallisations were required, so Pattinson's equipment consisted basically of nothing more complex than a row of up to 13 iron pots, which were heated from below. Some lead, naturally containing a small percentage of silver, was loaded into the central pot and melted. This was then allowed to cool. As the lead solidified it was removed using large perforated iron ladles and moved to the next pot in one direction, and the remaining metal which was now richer in silver was then transferred to the next pot in the opposite direction. The process was repeated from one pot to the next, the lead accumulating in the pot at one end and metal enriched in silver in the pot at the other.

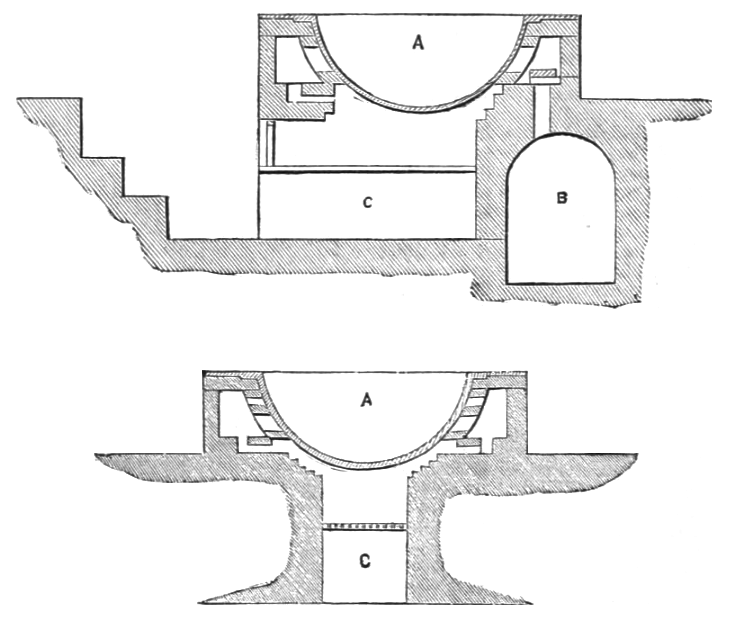
Sections of a pot

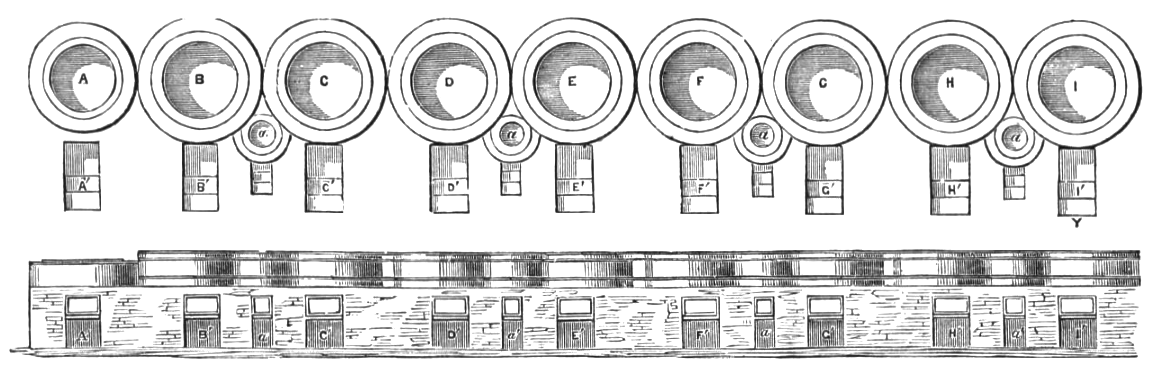
Arrangement of pots used in a smelting mill

The level of enrichment possible is limited by the lead-silver eutectic and typically the silver content of the silver-rich melt could not be raised above 2% (around 600 to 700 ounces per ton), so further separation is carried out by cupellation.

The process was economic for lead containing at least 250 grams of silver per ton. Being the first process applicable to low-grade lead, it supplemented earlier patio process and pan amalgamation.

It was replaced by the Parkes process in the mid-19th century.

== See also ==
- Parkes process - a method for separation of metals from lead through precipitation.
