= Pemaco Maywood =

Former chemical mixing company in Maywood, California, USA

Coordinates: 33°59′8″N 118°10′23″W

Pemaco is a former chemical mixing company and facility located on the Los Angeles River in Maywood, a small city in southeastern Los Angeles County, California.

Maywood Riverfront Park is located on the present day site. The company was operating at 5050 Slauson Boulevard in a light industrial and residential area on the channelized west bank of the LA River.

== History ==
It is believed that Pemaco began on-site operations in the late 1940s. Pemaco was purchased by the LUX Chemical Company in July 1988, and operations ended at the site in June 1991. Hazardous substances are known to have been used at the facility, including chlorinated solvents, aromatic solvents, and flammable liquids.

Shortly after the closure of the facility, the Los Angeles County Hazardous Materials (Hazmat) Unit ordered the potentially responsible party, LUX Chemical Company, to remove containers and drums of laboratory chemicals located in the warehouse and outside staging area.

=== Fire and aftermath ===
In December 1993, the facility burned to the ground before LUX removed all the containers and drums. Although the fire completely destroyed the warehouse, six 55-gallon drums, several above-ground storage tanks, and thirty-one underground storage tanks were unaffected by the fire.

Due to safety concerns after the fire, the Environmental Protection Agency was asked to conduct an emergency assessment and stabilize the site. The Agency responded by doing the following:

1. erecting a chain link fence with razor wire around the site
2. verifying that all storage tanks were empty
3. attaching locking caps to standpipes
4. removing a small number of 55-gallon drums for disposal

=== Assessment studies ===
Having completed post-fire site stabilization activities, EPA referred the site back to the LA County Hazmat and informed the EPA Site Assessment program about the site for further study. After further studies to define the nature and extent of contamination, and initiation of cleanup activities, the site was placed on the Superfund National Priorities List on January 19, 1999.

=== Toxic contaminants ===
During the initial assessment study at Pemaco, the EPA found high levels of volatile organic compounds (VOCs) in the soil beneath the site. The groundwater beneath the site was also contaminated with VOCs. VOCs at the site included: Perchloroethylene (PCE), Trichloroethylene (TCE), Trichloroethane (TCA), Dichloroethane (DCA) and vinyl chloride (VC). VOCs are known or suspected carcinogens and, therefore, could have posed a serious risk to neighbors if they were exposed to the chemicals.

Facility records indicate that the following materials were stored in tanks: methanol, ethanol, xylene, propylene glycol, 2-ethoxyethyl acetate, isopropyl acetate, isophorone, ethyl acetate, butanol, kerosene, tolusol, hexane, ispropanol, 2-butanone, 2-butoxy ethanol, toluene, acetone, and unleaded gasoline.

These compounds can have health effects on infants or very young children. It has been reported that "respiratory, allergic, or immune effects in infants or children" are associated with indoor VOCs and other indoor air pollutants. It is suggested that VOC particles in an indoor environment can be reduced by 50% when household rugs and carpets are cleaned with efficient vacuum cleaners and hot water. These chemicals can also cause nausea, vomiting, diarrhea, permanent blindness, deterioration of the central nervous system, neurological side effects, and in some cases may be cancerous or fatal.

=== Clean−up ===
In 1998, the EPA selected the soil vapor extraction method to clean up contaminated soils left behind after excavating the underground storage tanks. Commonly used throughout the country for this VOCs type of pollution remediation, soil vapor extraction removes toxic vapors from the soil, then treats them in a thermal oxidation system. The treatment system burns the vapors as they passed through a heated compartment. It included automatic safeguards to shut down in the event of malfunction, and it was tested to guarantee that emissions were within limits required by County, State and Federal Agencies. During incineration, most of the contaminants were reduced to non-toxic compounds, such as carbon dioxide and water.

The soil vapor extraction filter and thermal heating system worked as follows:

1. the soil gas passed through a filter system where a majority of contaminants were captured on filter material.
2. the unfiltered contaminants in the soil gas were then treated in a heated chamber that broke down the contaminants at temperatures exceeding 1,400 degrees F.

In 1998, the EPA collected weekly data on VOCs going into and coming out of the incinerator. The air at the fence line was sampled weekly to verify that no VOCs were leaving the site. EPA turned off the system later in 1998, because the sampling program did not measure potential dioxin emissions. However, based on tests of similar systems used on other projects, it is believed that emissions of VOCs, dioxins, and other chemicals were low and did not pose an elevated threat to public health.

The Record of Decision (ROD) for the permanent Pemaco site soil and groundwater pollution remediation was signed on January 13, 2005. Construction of the final remedy began during 2005. EPA completed construction of the remedy that was included in the Maywood Riverfront Park by June 2006. Construction of the treatment plant and placement of the equipment into the treatment plant continued until early 2007. EPA turned on the groundwater treatment system in April 2007. The soil vapor recovery and treatment system was turned on during May 2007, and Electrical resistance heating remediation for the source area of the site began full operations in September 2007. EPA turned off the Electrical Resistive Heating remedy in April 2008, and permanently transferred vapor treatment over to carbon filtration in June 2008. The concentrations in the ERH area, vapor treatment system, and groundwater continue to decrease over time.

== Maywood Riverfront Park ==
Since it was deemed safe to redevelop the Pemaco property during EPA's construction of the permanent treatment systems, the City of Maywood began work on the new Maywood Riverfront Park in August 2005. EPA completed construction of the treatment systems in the summer of 2006.

The Maywood Riverfront Park opened in May 2008, with access at 60th Street & Waker Avenue. It is located on the Los Angeles River and is part of the Los Angeles River Greenway Project planned along the entire 51 mile LA River. When fully completed the park complex will include a state-of-the-art playground for young children, basketball courts, and a riverfront bicycle path.

The City of Maywood is the most densely populated city in California. Before there were only two parks in Maywood that together made up 5.8 acres (2.3 ha), until Maywood Riverfront Park more than doubled the city's park area.

== See also ==
- Los Angeles River topics
- Superfund sites in California
