= 2009 Shaanxi lead poisoning scandal =

Lead poisoning incident in Shaanxi, China

The 2009 Shaanxi lead poisoning scandal occurred in the Shaanxi province of China when pollution from a lead plant poisoned children in the surrounding area. Over 850 were affected. Villagers have accused the local and central governments of covering up the scandal.

== History ==
In 2003 the Dongling Lead and Zinc Smelting Company set up a factory in the Changqing township near the city of Baoji, describing it in brochures as "a garden-like factory". Soon "100,000 tons of lead and zinc a year and 700,000 tons of coke" were being produced. In 2008 it paid more than £10m in taxes to the local government, 17% of the administration's total income, and provided jobs for 2,000 households. Local parents however noticed that children were showing signs of illness - such as nose bleeds and memory problems. 851 children from seven villages surrounding the plant displayed up to 10 times the level of lead in their blood deemed safe by Chinese authorities. Over 170 of the children had to be hospitalised.

Local villagers protested to authorities but claim they were ignored. On 17 August 2009 they attacked the plant causing the managers to flee. The plant has now been closed down, but according to Western reports all coverage in the Chinese media of events has now been banned.

Chinese lead supplies the country's battery industry, the world's largest. Lead poisoning can lead to anaemia, muscle weakness and brain damage and damages the nervous and reproductive systems.

== Similar events ==
The Times reported in September 2009 that "similar protests broke out in three other provinces, where horrified parents living near smelters of lead, copper and aluminium also learnt that their children had been poisoned—1,300 of them in one city alone". Villages that suffer from such pollution are often dubbed 'cancer villages". Child health is an important issue in China, where many families are restricted to just one child. Nearly 2,000 children were poisoned in the Shaanxi and Hunan provinces. Parents and villagers rioted in the Hunan province after the mass poisonings became known. The government promised to move villagers to a new, safer living location, but plans for the move were postponed when the new location was found also to be contaminated.

== See also ==
- Pollution in China
